= Lepidonia =

Scientific classification
- Kingdom: Plantae
- Clade: Tracheophytes
- Clade: Angiosperms
- Clade: Eudicots
- Clade: Asterids
- Order: Asterales
- Family: Asteraceae
- Subfamily: Vernonioideae
- Tribe: Vernonieae
- Genus: Lepidonia; S.F.Blake

Type species
- Lepidonia paleata S.F.Blake

Synonyms
- Vernonia sect. Lepidonia (S.F.Blake) B.L.Turner

Genus of flowering plants

Lepidonia is a genus of Mesoamerican flowering plants in the family Asteraceae.

== Taxonomy and classification ==
Lepidonia is classified within the tribe Vernonieae and the subtribe Leiboldiinae of the family Asteraceae. Its taxonomic relationships with the genera Leiboldia and Stramentopappus were examined by botanists Harold E. Robinson and Vicki A. Funk in a phylogenetic study published in 1987. The study investigated the classification and evolutionary relationships of these closely related genera.

Species

- Lepidonia callilepis (Gleason) H.Rob. & Funk - Michoacán, Guerrero, Oaxaca
- Lepidonia corae (Standl. & Steyerm.) H.Rob. & V.A.Funk - Guatemala
- Lepidonia jonesii (B.L.Turner) H.Rob. & V.A.Funk - Oaxaca
- Lepidonia lankesteri (S.F.Blake) H.Rob. & V.A.Funk - Costa Rica
- Lepidonia mexicana (Less.) H.Rob. & Funk - Veracruz
- Lepidonia paleata S.F.Blake - Guatemala
- Lepidonia salvinae (Hemsl.) H.Rob. & Funk - Guatemala, Chiapas
