= Eriopus =

Eriopus may refer to three different genera:

- Eriopus Treitschke, 1825, a taxonomic synonym for the insect genus Callopistria
- Eriopus D.Don, a taxonomic synonym for the plant genus Taraxacum
- Eriopus Sch.Bip. ex Baker, a taxonomic synonym of the plant genus Prestelia
