= Oliganthes =

Scientific classification
- Kingdom: Plantae
- Clade: Tracheophytes
- Clade: Angiosperms
- Clade: Eudicots
- Clade: Asterids
- Order: Asterales
- Family: Asteraceae
- Subfamily: Vernonioideae
- Tribe: Vernonieae
- Genus: Oliganthes; Cass.

Type species
- Oliganthes triflora Cass.

Synonyms
- Odontoloma Kunth; Trianthaea (DC.) Spach; Dialesta Kunth; Vernonia sect. Trianthaea DC.

Genus of flowering plants

Oliganthes is a genus of flowering plants in the tribe Vernonieae within the family Asteraceae.

Species

- Oliganthes anjanaribensis Beentje & D. J. N. Hind - Madagascar
- Oliganthes bathiaei (Humbert) Humbert - Madagascar
- Oliganthes lanuginosa (Bojer ex DC.) Humbert - Madagascar
- Oliganthes lecomtei (Humbert) Humbert - Madagascar
- Oliganthes pseudocentauropsis (Humbert) Humbert - Madagascar
- Oliganthes sublanata (Drake) Humbert - Madagascar
- Oliganthes triflora Cass. - Madagascar; introduced into Mexico
- Oliganthes tsaratananensis Humbert - Madagascar
- Oliganthes tsimihetorum Humbert - Madagascar

formerly included

several species once considered part of Oliganthes but now regarded as more suited to other genera: Eremosis Grosvenoria Harleya Piptocoma Pollalesta
