= Okia =

Okia may refer to:

- Okia (plant), a genus of plants in the family Asteraceae
- Okia, Kenya, settlement in Kenya
- Okia, settlement in Congo Republic
- Okia River, in Nigeria
- Okia, surname
  - Richard Okia, Uganda cricketer
