= Hystrichophora =

Hystricophora may refer to:

- Hystrichophora (moth), a genus of insects in the family Tortricidae
- Hystrichophora (plant), a genus of plants in the family Asteraceae
