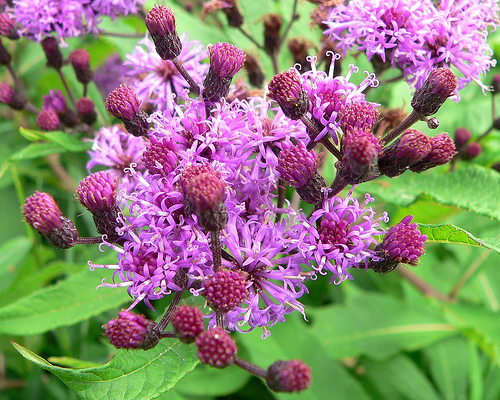
- Vernonia altissima

Scientific classification
- Kingdom: Plantae
- Clade: Tracheophytes
- Clade: Angiosperms
- Clade: Eudicots
- Clade: Asterids
- Order: Asterales
- Family: Asteraceae
- Subfamily: Vernonioideae
- Tribe: Vernonieae; Cassini

Subtribes
- Centrapalinae; Chrestinae; Dipterocypselinae; Distephaninae; Elephantopinae; Erlangeinae; Gymnantheminae; Hesperomanniinae; Leiboldiinae; Lepidaploinae; Linziinae; Lychnophorinae; Mesanthophorinae; Pacourininae; Piptocarphinae; Rolandrinae; Sipolisiinae; Stokesiinae; Trichospirinae; Vernoniinae

= Vernonieae =

Tribe of flowering plants

Vernonieae is a tribe of about 1300 species of plants in the aster family. They are mostly found in the tropics and warmer temperate areas, both in the Americas and the Old World. They are mostly herbaceous plants or shrubs, although there is at least one tree species, Strobocalyx arborea.

== Taxonomy ==
Vernonieae is considered sister to the tribe Liabeae. The tribe originated in southern Africa or Madagascar, and spread to the Americas in at least two different events.

In many works some 80% of the species in this tribe are classified in the genus Vernonia. Other authors, like Harold E. Robinson, divide the tribe into a larger number of small genera.

== Genera ==
Genera accepted by the Global Compositae Database as of March 2023:

- Acanthodesmos C.D.Adams & duQuesnay
- Acilepidopsis H.Rob.
- Acilepis D.Don
- Adenoon Dalzell
- Aedesia O.Hoffm.
- Ageratinastrum Mattf.
- Albertinia Spreng.
- Ambassa Steetz
- Ananthura H.Rob & Skvarla
- Anteremanthus H.Rob.
- Baccharoides L. ex Moench
- Bechium DC.
- Bishopalea H.Rob.
- Blanchetia DC.
- Bolanosa A.Gray
- Bothriocline Oliv. ex Benth.
- Brachythrix Wild & G.V.Pope
- Brenandendron H.Rob.
- Caatinganthus H.Rob.
- Cabobanthus H.Rob.
- Camchaya Gagnep.
- Centauropsis Bojer ex DC.
- Centratherum Cass. (synonym Oiospermum Less.)
- Chresta Vell. ex DC.
- Chronopappus DC.
- Cololobus H.Rob.
- Critoniopsis Sch.Bip. (synonym Tephrothamnus Sch.Bip.)
- Cuatrecasanthus H.Rob.
- Cyanthillium Blume
- Cyrtocymura H.Rob.
- Dasyandantha H.Rob.
- Dasyanthina H.Rob.
- Decaneuropsis H.Rob. & Skvarla
- Decastylocarpus Humbert
- Dewildemania O.Hoffm.
- Diaphractanthus Humbert
- Dipterocypsela S.F.Blake
- Distephanus Cass.
- Echinocoryne H.Rob.
- Eirmocephala H.Rob.
- Ekmania Gleason
- Elephantopus L.
- Eremanthus Less.
- Erlangea Sch.Bip.
- Ethulia L.f.
- Gorceixia Baker
- Gutenbergia Sch.Bip. ex Sch.Bip.
- Gymnanthemum Cass.
- Harleya S.F.Blake
- Herderia Cass.
- Hesperomannia A.Gray
- Heterocoma DC.
- Heterocypsela H.Rob.
- Hilliardiella H.Rob.
- Hoffmannanthus H.Rob., S.C.Keeley & Skvarla
- Hololepis DC.
- Huberopappus Pruski
- Hystrichophora Mattf.
- Iodocephalus Thorel ex Gagnep.
- Irwinia G.M.Barroso
- Jeffreycia H.Rob., S.C.Keeley & Skvarla
- Joseanthus H.Rob.
- Khasianthus H.Rob. & Skvarla
- Kinghamia C.Jeffrey
- Koyamasia H.Rob.
- Kurziella H.Rob. & Bunwong
- Lachnorhiza A.Rich.
- Lampropappus (O.Hoffm.) H.Rob.
- Lepidaploa (Cass.) Cass.
- Lepidonia (Gleason) S.F.Blake
- Lessingianthus H.Rob.
- Linzia Sch.Bip. ex Walp.
- Lychnophora Mart.
- Lychnophorella Loeuille, Semir & Pirani
- Lychnophoriopsis Sch.Bip.
- Manyonia H.Rob.
- Maschalostachys Loeuille & Roque
- Mattfeldanthus H.Rob. & R.M.King
- Mesanthophora H.Rob.
- Minasia H.Rob.
- Monosis DC.
- Msuata O.Hoffm.
- Muschleria S.Moore
- Myanmaria H.Rob.
- Neurolakis Mattf.
- Nothovernonia H.Rob. & V.A.Funk
- Okia H.Rob. & Skvarla
- Oliganthes Cass.
- Omphalopappus O.Hoffm.
- Oocephala (S.B.Jones) H.Rob.
- Orbivestus H.Rob.
- Orthopappus Gleason
- Pacourina Aubl.
- Paralychnophora MacLeish
- Parapolydora H.Rob.
- Paurolepis S.Moore
- Phyllocephalum Blume
- Piptocarpha R.Br.
- Piptocoma Cass.
- Piptolepis Sch.Bip.
- Pithecoseris Mart. ex DC.
- Pleurocarpaea Benth.
- Polydora Fenzl
- Prestelia Sch.Bip.
- Proteopsis Mart. & Zucc. ex Sch.Bip.
- Pseudelephantopus Rohr
- Pseudopiptocarpha H.Rob.
- Pulicarioidea Bunwong, Chantar. & S.C.Keeley
- Quechualia H.Rob.
- Rastrophyllum Wild & G.V.Pope
- Rolandra Rottb.
- Roquea Loeuille & Antar
- Sipolisia Glaz. ex Oliv.
- Soaresia Sch.Bip.
- Spiracantha Kunth
- Stenocephalum Sch.Bip.
- Stilpnopappus Mart. ex DC.
- Stokesia L'Hér.
- Stramentopappus H.Rob. & V.A.Funk
- Strobocalyx (Blume ex DC.) Spach
- Struchium P.Browne
- Tarlmounia H.Rob., S.C.Keeley, Skvarla & R.Chan
- Telmatophila Mart. ex Baker
- Trepadonia H.Rob.
- Trichospira Kunth
- Vernonanthura H.Rob.
- Vernonella Sond.
- Vernonia Schreb. (synonym Centrapalus Cass.)
- Vernoniastrum H.Rob.
- Vickianthus H.Rob.
- Vinicia Dematt.
- Xerxes J.R.Grant
- Xiphochaeta Poepp.
