= Ananthura =

Ananthura may refer to:

- Ananthura (isopod), a genus of isopods in the family Antheluridae
- Ananthura (plant), a genus of plants in the family Asteraceae
