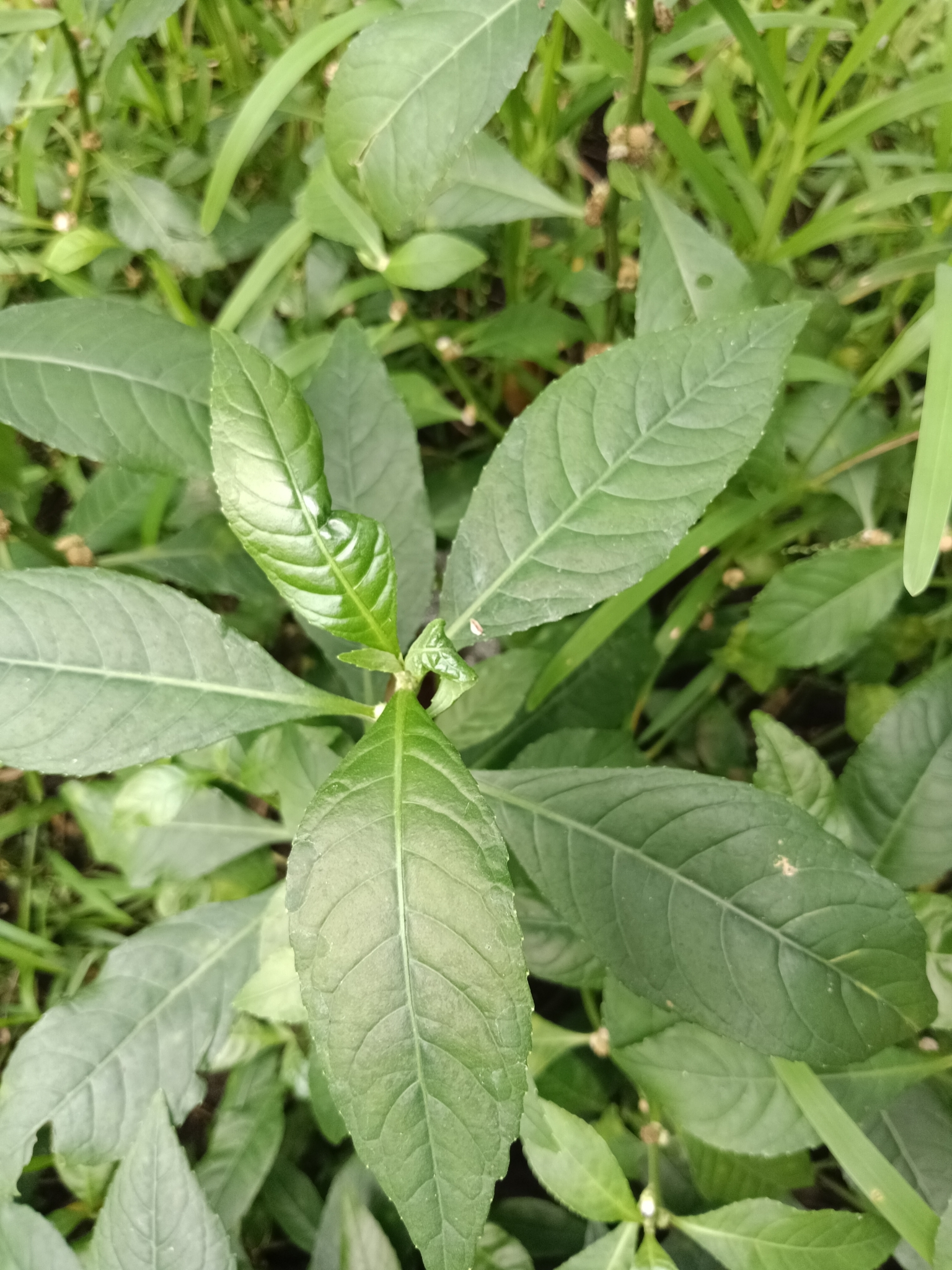
- Struchium sparganophorum

Scientific classification
- Kingdom: Plantae
- Clade: Tracheophytes
- Clade: Angiosperms
- Clade: Eudicots
- Clade: Asterids
- Order: Asterales
- Family: Asteraceae
- Subfamily: Cichorioideae
- Tribe: Vernonieae
- Genus: Struchium; P.Browne

Type species
- Struchium herbaceum J.St.-Hil. (syn. of S. sparganophorum)

Synonyms
- Sparganophorus Vaill. ex Crantz; Sparganophorus Vaill. ex Boehm.; Athenaea Adans.

= Struchium =

Genus of plants

Struchium is a genus of flowering plants in the tribe Vernonieae within the family Asteraceae.

Species

- Struchium americanum Poir. – Jamaica
- Struchium sparganophorum (L.) Kuntze – Mesoamerica, South America, West Indies
