= Minasia =

Scientific classification
- Kingdom: Plantae
- Clade: Tracheophytes
- Clade: Angiosperms
- Clade: Eudicots
- Clade: Asterids
- Order: Asterales
- Family: Asteraceae
- Subfamily: Vernonioideae
- Tribe: Vernonieae
- Genus: Minasia; H.Rob.

Type species
- Chresta alpestris Gardner.

Genus of flowering plants

Minasia is a genus of Brazilian plants in the tribe Vernonieae within the family Asteraceae.

== Species ==
All known species are native to the Espinhaço Mountains in the State of Minas Gerais in Brazil.

- Minasia alpestris
- Minasia cabralensis
- Minasia lewinsohnii
- Minasia pereirae
- Minasia ramosa
- Minasia scapigera
- Minasia splettiae
