= Gorceixia =

Scientific classification
- Kingdom: Plantae
- Clade: Embryophytes
- Clade: Tracheophytes
- Clade: Angiosperms
- Clade: Eudicots
- Clade: Asterids
- Order: Asterales
- Family: Asteraceae
- Subfamily: Vernonioideae
- Tribe: Vernonieae
- Genus: Gorceixia; Baker
- Species: G. decurrens

Binomial name
- Gorceixia decurrens Baker

Genus of flowering plants

Gorceixia is a genus of flowering plants in the family Asteraceae.

== Species ==
There is only one known species, Gorceixia decurrens, native to Brazil (Bahia, Espírito Santo, Minas Gerais).
