= Anteremanthus =

Scientific classification
- Kingdom: Plantae
- Clade: Tracheophytes
- Clade: Angiosperms
- Clade: Eudicots
- Clade: Asterids
- Order: Asterales
- Family: Asteraceae
- Subfamily: Cichorioideae
- Tribe: Vernonieae
- Genus: Anteremanthus; H.Rob.

Genus of flowering plants

Anteremanthus is a genus of flowering plants belonging to the family Asteraceae.

Its native range is Eastern Brazil.

Species:

- Anteremanthus hatschbachii H.Rob.
- Anteremanthus piranii Roque & F.A.Santana
