= Decastylocarpus =

Scientific classification
- Kingdom: Plantae
- Clade: Embryophytes
- Clade: Tracheophytes
- Clade: Angiosperms
- Clade: Eudicots
- Clade: Asterids
- Order: Asterales
- Family: Asteraceae
- Subfamily: Vernonioideae
- Tribe: Vernonieae
- Genus: Decastylocarpus; Humbert
- Species: D. perrieri

Binomial name
- Decastylocarpus perrieri Humbert

Genus of flowering plants

Decastylocarpus is a genus of flowering plants in the family Asteraceae.

There is only one known species, Decastylocarpus perrieri, endemic to Madagascar.
