= Soaresia =

Scientific classification
- Kingdom: Plantae
- Clade: Tracheophytes
- Clade: Angiosperms
- Clade: Eudicots
- Clade: Asterids
- Order: Asterales
- Family: Asteraceae
- Subfamily: Vernonioideae
- Tribe: Vernonieae
- Genus: Soaresia; Sch.Bip.
- Species: S. velutina

Binomial name
- Soaresia velutina Sch.Bip.

Synonyms
- Bipontia S.F.Blake; Bipontia velutina (Sch.Bip.) S.F.Blake

Genus of plants

Soaresia is a genus of plants in the tribe Vernonieae belonging to the family Asteraceae. It is monotypic, being represented by the single species, Soaresia velutina, which is native to Brazil (Rondônia, Minas Gerais, D.F., Goiás, Mato Grosso).
