= Koyamasia =

Scientific classification
- Kingdom: Plantae
- Clade: Tracheophytes
- Clade: Angiosperms
- Clade: Eudicots
- Clade: Asterids
- Order: Asterales
- Family: Asteraceae
- Subfamily: Vernonioideae
- Tribe: Vernonieae
- Subtribe: Vernoniinae
- Genus: Koyamasia; H.Rob.

Species
- Koyamasia calcarea (Kitam.) H.Rob.; Koyamasia curtisii (Craib & Hutch.) Bunwong, Chantar. & S.C.Keeley

Genus of flowering plants

Koyamasia is a genus of flowering plants in the family Asteraceae. It includes two species of perennials native to Peninsular Malaysia and Thailand.

- Koyamasia calcarea (Kitam.) H.Rob. – northern Thailand
- Koyamasia curtisii (Craib & Hutch.) Bunwong, Chantar. & S.C.Keeley – Thailand and Peninsular Malaysia (Langkawi)
