= Huberopappus =

Scientific classification
- Kingdom: Plantae
- Clade: Tracheophytes
- Clade: Angiosperms
- Clade: Eudicots
- Clade: Asterids
- Order: Asterales
- Family: Asteraceae
- Subfamily: Cichorioideae
- Tribe: Vernonieae
- Genus: Huberopappus; Pruski
- Species: H. maigualidae

Binomial name
- Huberopappus maigualidae Pruski

Genus of flowering plants

Huberopappus is a monotypic genus of flowering plants belonging to the family Asteraceae. It only contains one species, Huberopappus maigualidae.

It is native to Venezuela.

The genus name of Huberopappus is in honour of Otto Huber (b. 1944), an Italian ecologist known for his work on the botany, phytogeography and conservation of the neotropics. The Latin specific epithet of maigualidae refers to Sierra de Maigualida in Guiana Shield, southern Venezuela.

Both species and genus were first described and published in 1992.
