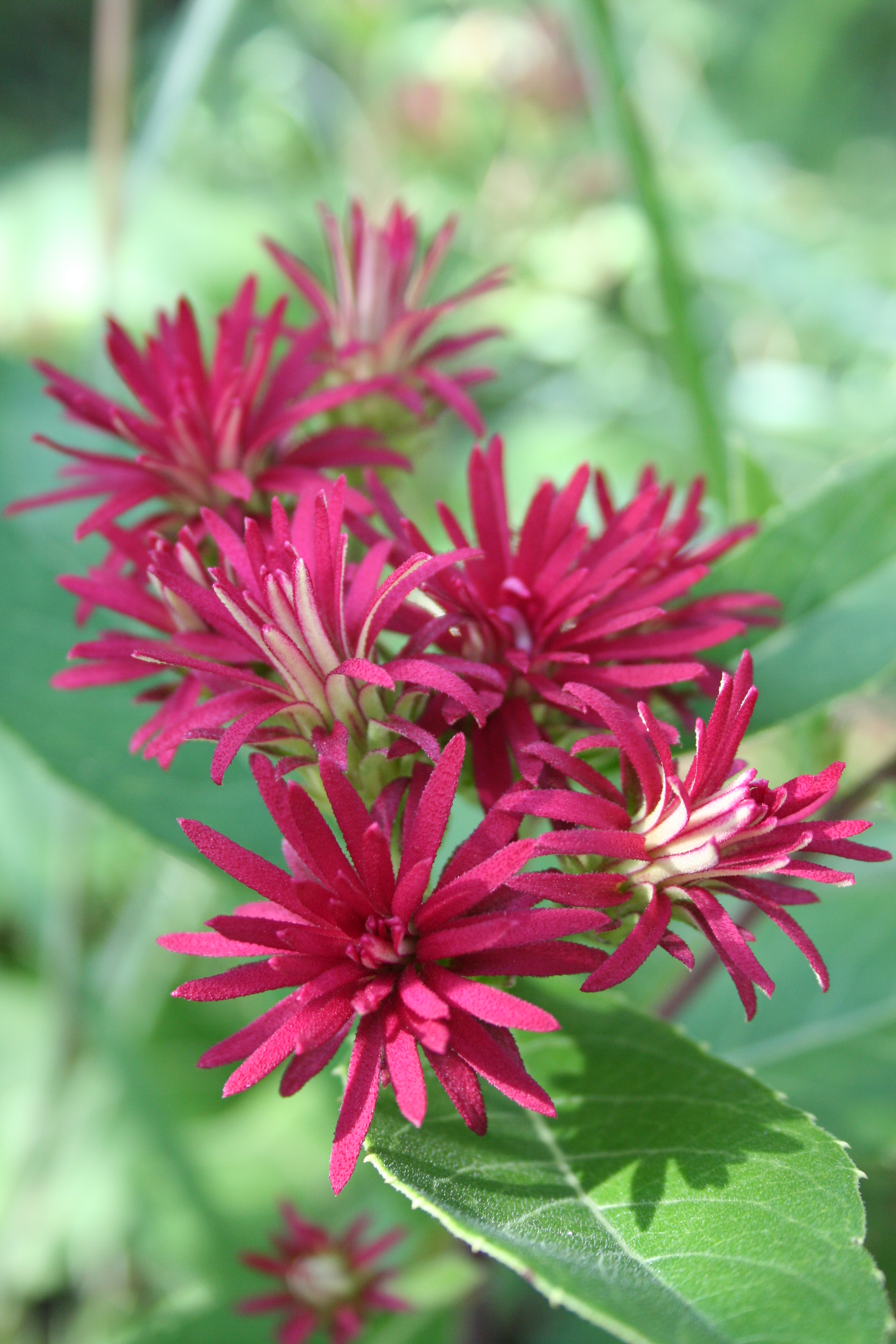
- Linzia nigritiana

Scientific classification
- Kingdom: Plantae
- Clade: Tracheophytes
- Clade: Angiosperms
- Clade: Eudicots
- Clade: Asterids
- Order: Asterales
- Family: Asteraceae
- Subfamily: Vernonioideae
- Tribe: Vernonieae
- Subtribe: Linziinae
- Genus: Linzia; Sch.Bip. ex Walp.

Species
- 9; see text

= Linzia =

Genus of flowering plants

Linzia is a genus of flowering plants in the family Asteraceae. It includes nine species native to tropical Africa and Madagascar.

== Species ==
Nine species are accepted.

- Linzia accommodata (Wild) H.Rob.
- Linzia gerberiformis (Oliv. & Hiern) H.Rob.
- Linzia glabra Steetz
- Linzia infundibularis (Oliv. & Hiern) H.Rob.
- Linzia ituriensis (Muschl.) H.Rob.
- Linzia melleri (Oliv. & Hiern) H.Rob.
- Linzia nigritiana (Oliv. & Hiern) C.Jeffrey
- Linzia rosenii (R.E.Fr.) H.Rob., Skvarla & V.A.Funk
- Linzia usafuensis (O.Hoffm.) H.Rob.
