= Ethulia =

Scientific classification
- Kingdom: Plantae
- Clade: Tracheophytes
- Clade: Angiosperms
- Clade: Eudicots
- Clade: Asterids
- Order: Asterales
- Family: Asteraceae
- Subfamily: Vernonioideae
- Tribe: Vernonieae
- Genus: Ethulia; L.f.

Type species
- Ethulia conyzoides L.f.

Synonyms
- Aethulia A.Gray, pro syn.; Hoehnelia Schweinf.; Kahiria Forssk.; Leighia Scop., nom. illeg. superfl.; Pirarda Adans.

Genus of flowering plants

Ethulia is a genus of tropical and subtropical Asian and African flowering plants in the family Asteraceae.

== Species ==
15 species are accepted.

- Ethulia acuminata M.G.Gilbert
- Ethulia bicostata M.G.Gilbert
- Ethulia burundiensis M.G.Gilbert & C.Jeffrey
- Ethulia conyzoides L.f.
- Ethulia faulknerae C.Jeffrey
- Ethulia gracilis Delile
- Ethulia greenwayi M.G.Gilbert
- Ethulia luzonica M.G.Gilbert
- Ethulia ngorongoroensis M.G.Gilbert
- Ethulia paucifructa M.G.Gilbert
- Ethulia rhizomata M.G.Gilbert
- Ethulia ruhudjiensis M.G.Gilbert
- Ethulia scheffleri S.Moore
- Ethulia triflora J.Kost.
- Ethulia vernonioides (Schweinf.) M.G.Gilbert
