= Dewildemania =

Scientific classification
- Kingdom: Plantae
- Clade: Embryophytes
- Clade: Tracheophytes
- Clade: Angiosperms
- Clade: Eudicots
- Clade: Asterids
- Order: Asterales
- Family: Asteraceae
- Subfamily: Vernonioideae
- Tribe: Vernonieae
- Genus: Dewildemania; O. Hoffm. ex De Wild

Type species
- Dewildemania filifolia O. Hoffmann

Genus of flowering plants

Dewildemania is a genus of African flowering plants in the family Asteraceae.

Species

- Dewildemania burundiensis
- Dewildemania filifolia
- Dewildemania glandulosa
- Dewildemania lancifolia
- Dewildemania platycephala
- Dewildemania platycephala
- Dewildemania stenophylla
- Dewildemania upembensis
