= Hololepis =

Scientific classification
- Kingdom: Plantae
- Clade: Embryophytes
- Clade: Tracheophytes
- Clade: Angiosperms
- Clade: Eudicots
- Clade: Asterids
- Order: Asterales
- Family: Asteraceae
- Subfamily: Vernonioideae
- Tribe: Vernonieae
- Genus: Hololepis; DC.

Genus of flowering plants

Hololepis is a genus of Brazilian plants in the tribe Vernonieae within the family Asteraceae.

Species

- Hololepis hatschbachii H.Rob. - State of Espirito Santo in Brazil
- Hololepis pedunculata (DC. ex Pers.) DC. - State of Minas Gerais in Brazil
