= Roquea =

Scientific classification
- Kingdom: Plantae
- Clade: Tracheophytes
- Clade: Angiosperms
- Clade: Eudicots
- Clade: Asterids
- Order: Asterales
- Family: Asteraceae
- Tribe: Vernonieae
- Subtribe: Lychnophorinae
- Genus: Roquea; Loeuille & Antar
- Species: R. multiserialis

Binomial name
- Roquea multiserialis Loeuille & Antar

Genus of flowering plants

Roquea is a genus of flowering plants in the family Asteraceae. It includes a single species, Roquea multiserialis, a shrub endemic to Minas Gerais state in southeastern Brazil.
