= Centauropsis =

Scientific classification
- Kingdom: Plantae
- Clade: Embryophytes
- Clade: Tracheophytes
- Clade: Angiosperms
- Clade: Eudicots
- Clade: Asterids
- Order: Asterales
- Family: Asteraceae
- Subfamily: Vernonioideae
- Tribe: Vernonieae
- Genus: Centauropsis; Bojer ex DC.

Genus of plants in the daisy family

Centauropsis is a genus of flowering plants in the family Asteraceae.

Species

All the known species are endemic to Madagascar.

- Centauropsis antanossi (Scott-Elliot) Humbert
- Centauropsis cuspidata Humbert
- Centauropsis decaryi Humbert
- Centauropsis fruticosa Bojer ex DC.
- Centauropsis lanuginosa Bojer ex DC.
- Centauropsis laurifolia Humbert
- Centauropsis perrieri Humbert
- Centauropsis rhaponticoides (Baker) Drake
- Centauropsis vilersii Humbert
