= Pleurocarpaea =

Scientific classification
- Kingdom: Plantae
- Clade: Tracheophytes
- Clade: Angiosperms
- Clade: Eudicots
- Clade: Asterids
- Order: Asterales
- Family: Asteraceae
- Subfamily: Cichorioideae
- Tribe: Vernonieae
- Genus: Pleurocarpaea; Benth.

Type species
- Pleurocarpaea denticulata Benth.

Genus of plants

Pleurocarpaea is a genus of Australian plants in the tribe Vernonieae within the family Asteraceae.

Species

- Pleurocarpaea denticulata Benth. – Western Australia, Queensland, Northern Territory (including islands in Gulf of Carpentaria)
- Pleurocarpaea fasciculata Dunlop – Northern Territory
- Pleurocarpaea gracilis Lander & P.J.H.Hurter – Western Australia
