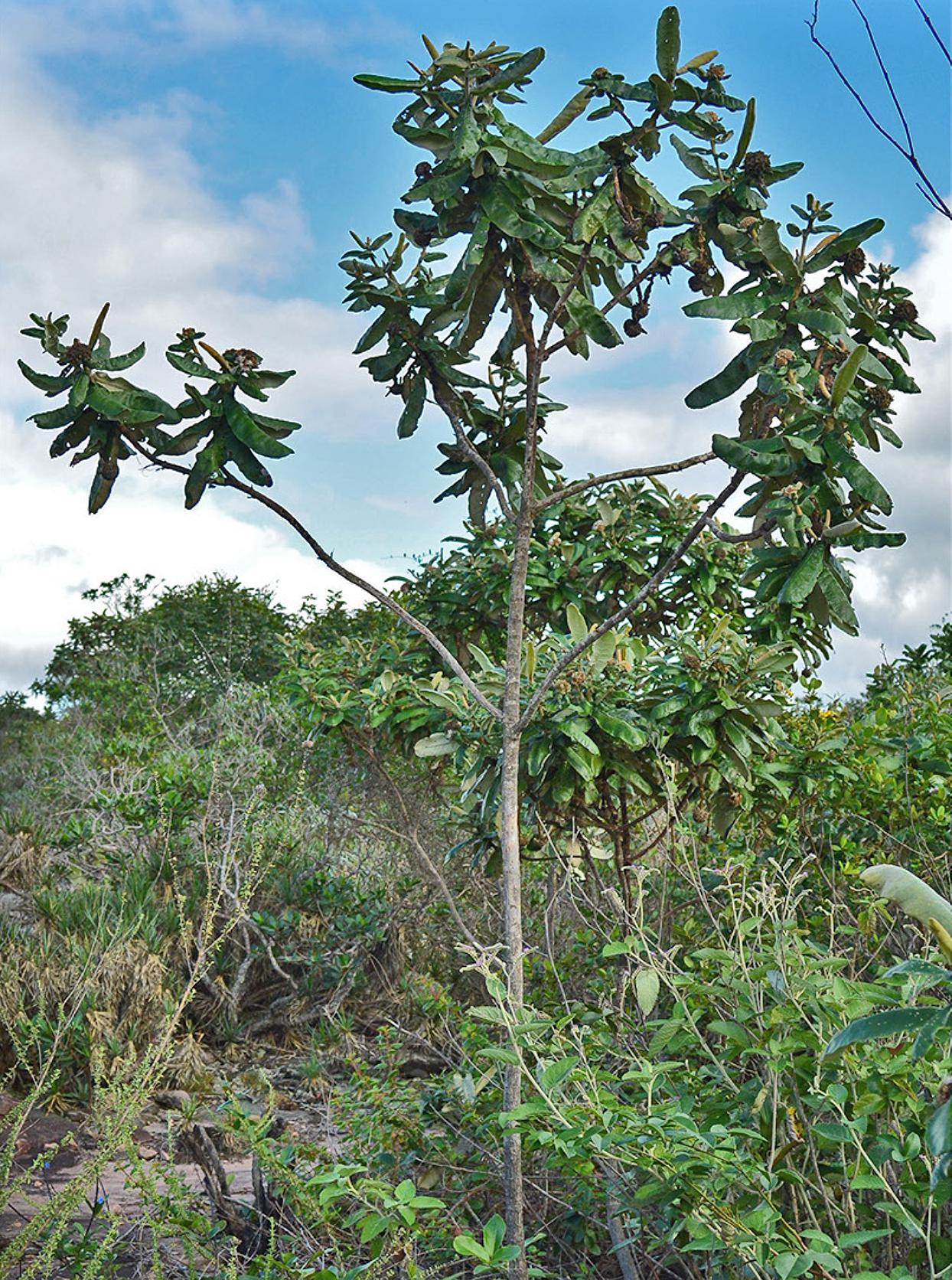
- Paralychnophora reflexoauriculata

Scientific classification
- Kingdom: Plantae
- Clade: Tracheophytes
- Clade: Angiosperms
- Clade: Eudicots
- Clade: Asterids
- Order: Asterales
- Family: Asteraceae
- Subfamily: Vernonioideae
- Tribe: Vernonieae
- Genus: Paralychnophora; MacLeish

Synonyms
- Sphaerophora Sch.Bip.

= Paralychnophora =

Genus of flowering plants

Paralychnophora is a genus of plants belonging to the family Asteraceae.

== Species ==
Species accepted by the Plants of the World Online as of March 2023:

- Paralychnophora atkinsiae D.J.N.Hind
- Paralychnophora bicolor (DC.) MacLeish
- Paralychnophora glaziouana Loeuille
- Paralychnophora harleyi (H.Rob.) D.J.N.Hind
- Paralychnophora patriciana D.J.N.Hind
- Paralychnophora reflexoauriculata (G.M.Barroso) MacLeish
