= Manyonia =

Scientific classification
- Kingdom: Plantae
- Clade: Tracheophytes
- Clade: Angiosperms
- Clade: Eudicots
- Clade: Asterids
- Order: Asterales
- Family: Asteraceae
- Subfamily: Vernonioideae
- Tribe: Vernonieae
- Genus: Manyonia; H.Rob.
- Species: M. peculiaris

Binomial name
- Manyonia peculiaris (Verdc.) H.Rob.

Synonyms
- Vernonia peculiaris Verdc.

Genus of flowering plants

Manyonia is a genus of flowering plants in the family Asteraceae. It includes a single species, Manyonia peculiaris, which is endemic to Tanzania.

Manyonia peculiaris is an annual herb 30-120 cm tall, with many slender and ascending branches. Leaves are elliptic, 2.5 to 20 cm long, 0.8 to 8.5 cm wide, with serrated margins and a cuneate base or with proximal leaves cuneate-attenuate into a petioloid base. The flowers form capitula on long arching branches. Flowers are glabrous and purple to pale mauve, rarely cream, with petals 3 to 6 mm long and lobes 1 to 1.5 mm long.

The species is native to the bushland/woodland transition from 850 to 1700 metres elevation, and grows on or around rock outcrops and in rocky gorges.

The species was first described as Vernonia peculiaris by Bernard Verdcourt in 1957. In 1999 Harold E. Robinson placed it in the new monotypic genus Manyonia as M. peculiaris.
