= Dipterocypsela =

Scientific classification
- Kingdom: Plantae
- Clade: Tracheophytes
- Clade: Angiosperms
- Clade: Eudicots
- Clade: Asterids
- Order: Asterales
- Family: Asteraceae
- Subfamily: Cichorioideae
- Tribe: Vernonieae
- Genus: Dipterocypsela; S.F.Blake
- Species: D. succulenta

Binomial name
- Dipterocypsela succulenta S.F.Blake

Genus of flowering plants

Dipterocypsela is a genus of flowering plants in the family Asteraceae.

There is only one known species, Dipterocypsela succulenta, endemic to the Magdalena region of Colombia.
