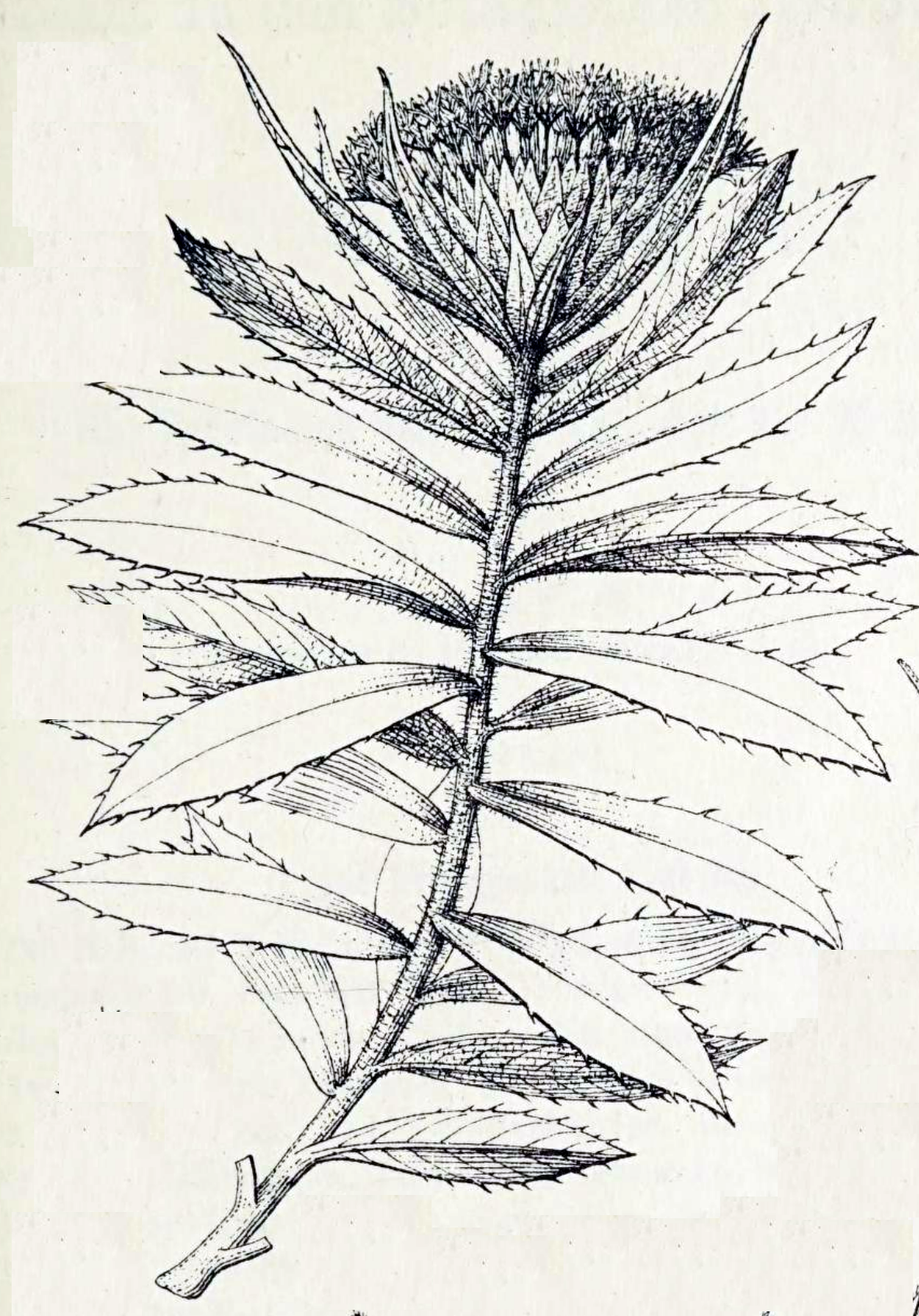
- Illustration of Aedesia engleriana accompanying its protologue

Scientific classification
- Kingdom: Plantae
- Clade: Embryophytes
- Clade: Tracheophytes
- Clade: Angiosperms
- Clade: Eudicots
- Clade: Asterids
- Order: Asterales
- Family: Asteraceae
- Subfamily: Vernonioideae
- Tribe: Vernonieae
- Genus: Aedesia; O.Hoffm.

Type species
- Aedesia glabra (Klatt) O.Hoffm.

= Aedesia (plant) =

Genus of flowering plants

Aediesia is a genus of African plants in the tribe Vernonieae tribe within the family Asteraceae.

== Taxonomy ==
The genus was discovered by O.Hoffm. & Prantl y publicado en Nat. Pflanzenfam. Nachtr. 1: 321. 1897.

== Species ==
- Aedesia engleriana Mattf. - Cameroon
- Aedesia glabra (Klatt) O.Hoffm. - tropical Africa from Senegal to Tanzania
- Aedesia spectabilis Mattf. - Cameroon
