= Bechium =

Scientific classification
- Kingdom: Plantae
- Clade: Tracheophytes
- Clade: Angiosperms
- Clade: Eudicots
- Clade: Asterids
- Order: Asterales
- Family: Asteraceae
- Subfamily: Cichorioideae
- Tribe: Vernonieae
- Genus: Bechium; DC.

Genus of flowering plants

Bechium is a genus of flowering plants belonging to the family Asteraceae.

Its native range is Madagascar.

Species:

- Bechium nudicaule (Less.) H.Rob.
- Bechium rhodolepis (Baker) H.Rob.
- Bechium rubricaule DC.
