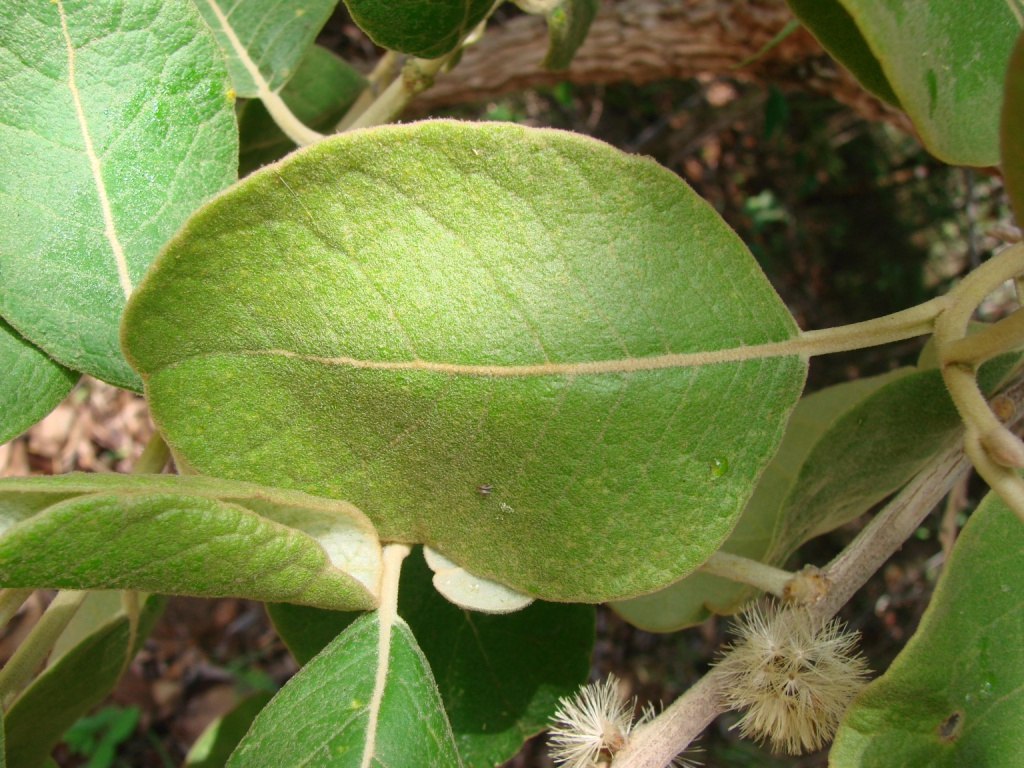
- Piptocarpha rotundifolia

Scientific classification
- Kingdom: Plantae
- Clade: Tracheophytes
- Clade: Angiosperms
- Clade: Eudicots
- Clade: Asterids
- Order: Asterales
- Family: Asteraceae
- Subfamily: Cichorioideae
- Tribe: Vernonieae
- Genus: Piptocarpha; R.Br.

Type species
- Piptocarpha brasiliana Cassini

Synonyms
- Carphobolus Schott ex Sch.Bip.; Monanthemum Griseb.; Vanillosma Spach

= Piptocarpha =

Genus of flowering plants

Piptocarpha is a genus of flowering plants in the family Asteraceae. Ashdaisy is a common name for these plants.

== Species ==
Species accepted by the Plants of the World Online as of March 2023:

- Piptocarpha angustifolia Dusén ex Malme
- Piptocarpha asterotricha (Poepp.) Baker
- Piptocarpha atratoensis Cuatrec.
- Piptocarpha auyantepuiensis Aristeg.
- Piptocarpha axillaris (Less.) Baker
- Piptocarpha barbata Volet & Semir
- Piptocarpha barrosoana G.Lom.Sm.
- Piptocarpha boyacensis Cuatrec.
- Piptocarpha brasiliana Cass.
- Piptocarpha canescens Gleason
- Piptocarpha cardenasii Pruski
- Piptocarpha densifolia G.Lom.Sm.
- Piptocarpha geraldsmithii H.Rob.
- Piptocarpha gustavo-valerioana G.Lom.Sm.
- Piptocarpha gutierrezii Cuatrec.
- Piptocarpha isotrichia (DC.) Cabrera & Vittet
- Piptocarpha jauaensis Aristeg. & Steyerm.
- Piptocarpha jonesiana G.Lom.Sm.
- Piptocarpha klugii H.Rob.
- Piptocarpha lechleri (Sch.Bip.) Baker
- Piptocarpha leprosa (Less.) Baker
- Piptocarpha longipedunculata Volet
- Piptocarpha lucida (Spreng.) Benn. ex Baker
- Piptocarpha lundiana (Less.) Baker
- Piptocarpha macropoda (DC.) Baker
- Piptocarpha matogrossensis H.Rob.
- Piptocarpha megaphylla Cabrera
- Piptocarpha notata Baker
- Piptocarpha oblonga (Gardner) Baker
- Piptocarpha opaca Baker
- Piptocarpha organensis Cabrera
- Piptocarpha poeppigiana (DC.) Baker
- Piptocarpha polycephala Baker
- Piptocarpha prancei G.Lom.Sm.
- Piptocarpha pyrifolia Baker
- Piptocarpha quadrangularis (Vell.) Baker
- Piptocarpha ramboi G.Lom.Sm.
- Piptocarpha ramiflora (Spreng.) Baker
- Piptocarpha regnellii (Sch.Bip.) Cabrera
- Piptocarpha richteri Cuatrec.
- Piptocarpha riedelii Baker
- Piptocarpha robusta G.M.Barroso
- Piptocarpha rotundifolia Baker
- Piptocarpha sellovii (Sch.Bip.) Baker
- Piptocarpha steyermarkii Aristeg.
- Piptocarpha stifftioides H.Rob.
- Piptocarpha subcorymbosa G.Lom.Sm.
- Piptocarpha tetrantha Urb.
- Piptocarpha tomentosa Baker
- Piptocarpha triflora Benn. ex Baker
- Piptocarpha vasquezii H.Rob.
- Piptocarpha verticillata (Vell.) G.Lom.Sm. ex H.Rob.
