= Kurziella =

Scientific classification
- Kingdom: Plantae
- Clade: Tracheophytes
- Clade: Angiosperms
- Clade: Eudicots
- Clade: Asterids
- Order: Asterales
- Family: Asteraceae
- Subfamily: Vernonioideae
- Tribe: Vernonieae
- Subtribe: Erlangeinae
- Genus: Kurziella; H.Rob. & Bunwong
- Species: K. gymnoclada

Binomial name
- Kurziella gymnoclada (Collett & Hemsl.) H.Rob. & Bunwong

Synonyms
- Cacalia gymnoclada Kuntze; Vernonia gymnoclada Collett & Hemsl. (1890) (basionym)

Genus of flowering plants

Kurziella is a genus of flowering plants in the family Asteraceae. It includes a single species, Kurziella gymnoclada, a perennial native to Myanmar and Thailand.
