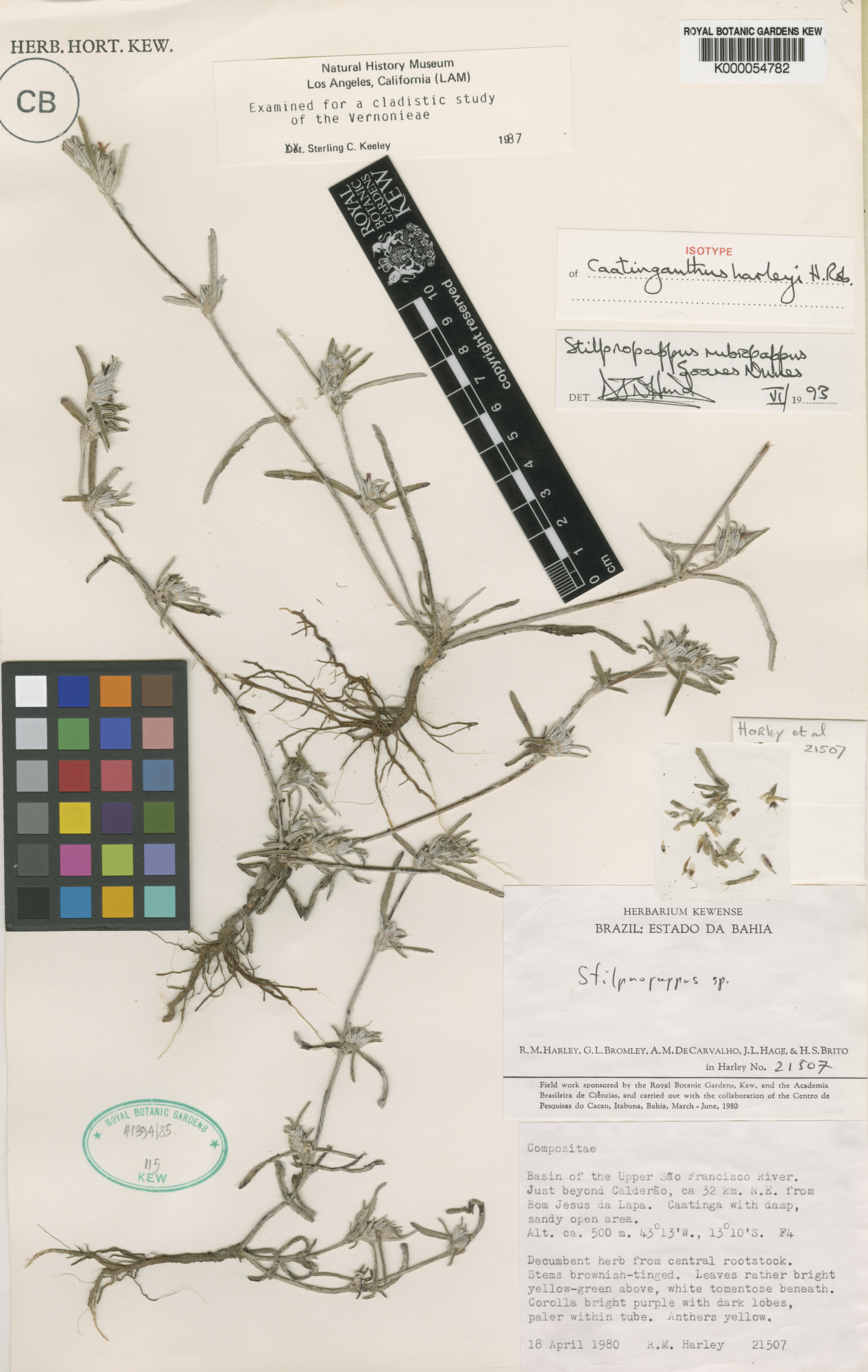
- Caatinganthus harleyi

Scientific classification
- Kingdom: Plantae
- Clade: Embryophytes
- Clade: Tracheophytes
- Clade: Spermatophytes
- Clade: Angiosperms
- Clade: Eudicots
- Clade: Asterids
- Order: Asterales
- Family: Asteraceae
- Subfamily: Vernonioideae
- Tribe: Vernonieae
- Genus: Caatinganthus; H.Rob.

Type species
- Caatinganthus harleyi H.Rob.

= Caatinganthus =

Genus of flowering plants

Caatinganthus is a genus of Brazilian plants in the tribe Vernonieae within the family Asteraceae.

Species

- Caatinganthus harleyi H.Rob. - Bahia
- Caatinganthus rubropappus (Soar.Nunes) H.Rob. - Pernambuco, Rio Grande do Norte
