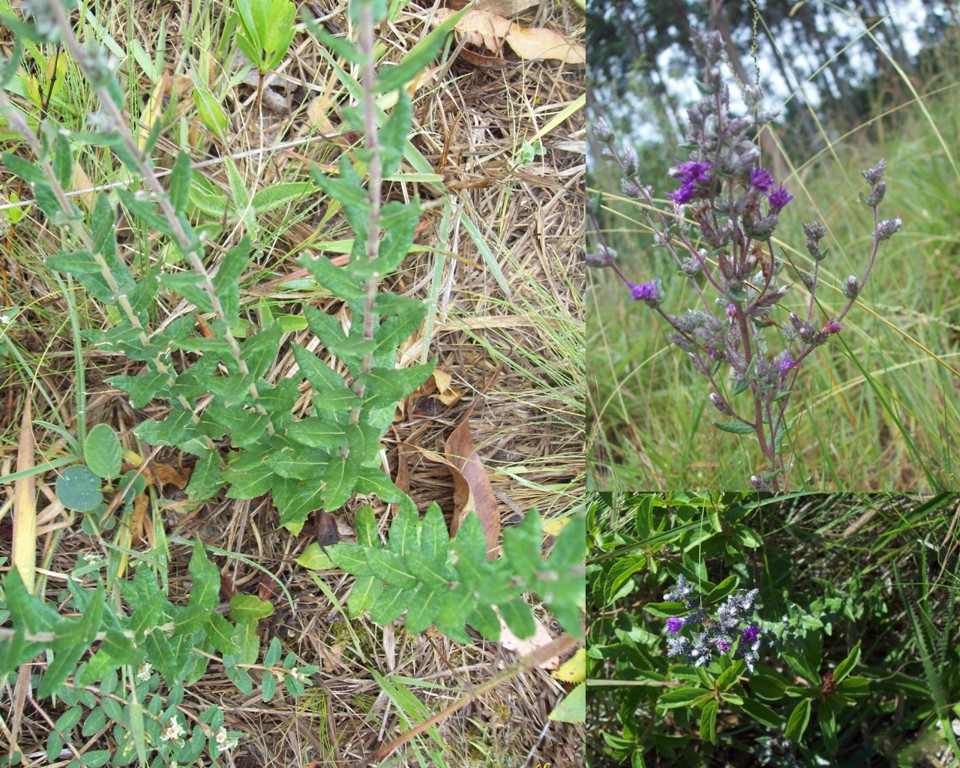

Scientific classification
- Kingdom: Plantae
- Clade: Tracheophytes
- Clade: Angiosperms
- Clade: Eudicots
- Clade: Asterids
- Order: Asterales
- Family: Asteraceae
- Subfamily: Vernonioideae
- Tribe: Vernonieae
- Genus: Stenocephalum; Sch.Bip.

= Stenocephalum =

Genus of plants

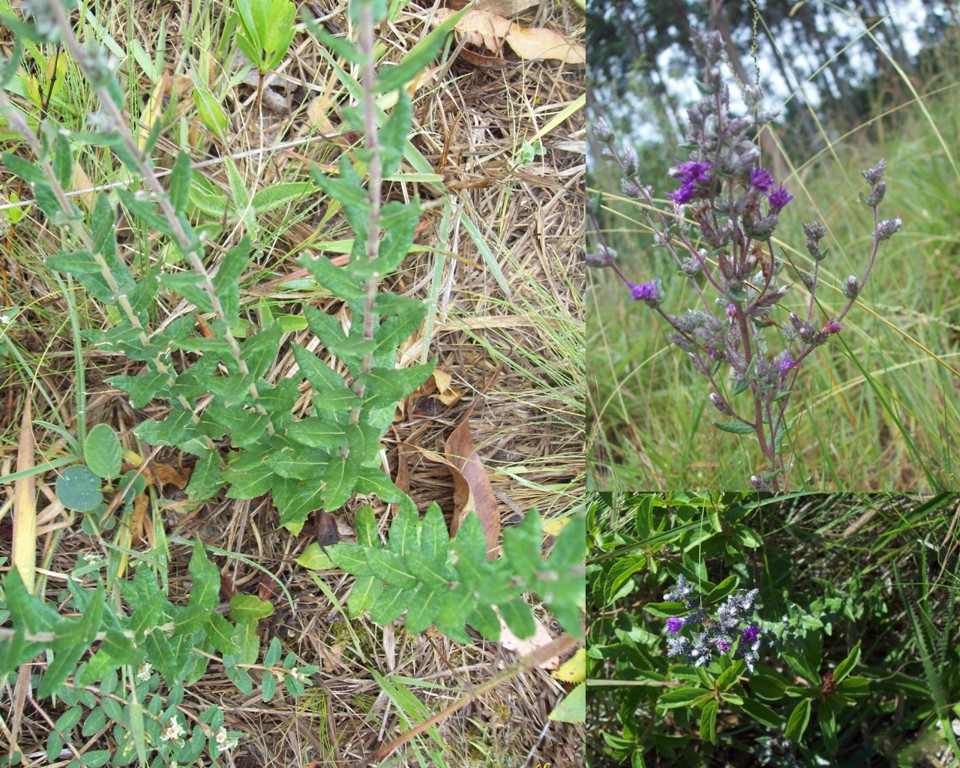

Stenocephalum is a genus of flowering plants belonging to the family Asteraceae.

Its native range is Southern Mexico to Guatemala, and Southern Tropical America.

== Species ==
Species:

- Stenocephalum apiculatum Sch.Bip.
- Stenocephalum hexanthum Sch.Bip.
- Stenocephalum hystrix (Chodat) H.Rob.
- Stenocephalum jucundum (Gleason) H.Rob.
- Stenocephalum megapotamicum Sch.Bip.
- Stenocephalum monticola (Mart. ex DC.) Sch.Bip.
- Stenocephalum tragiifolium (DC.) Sch.Bip.
