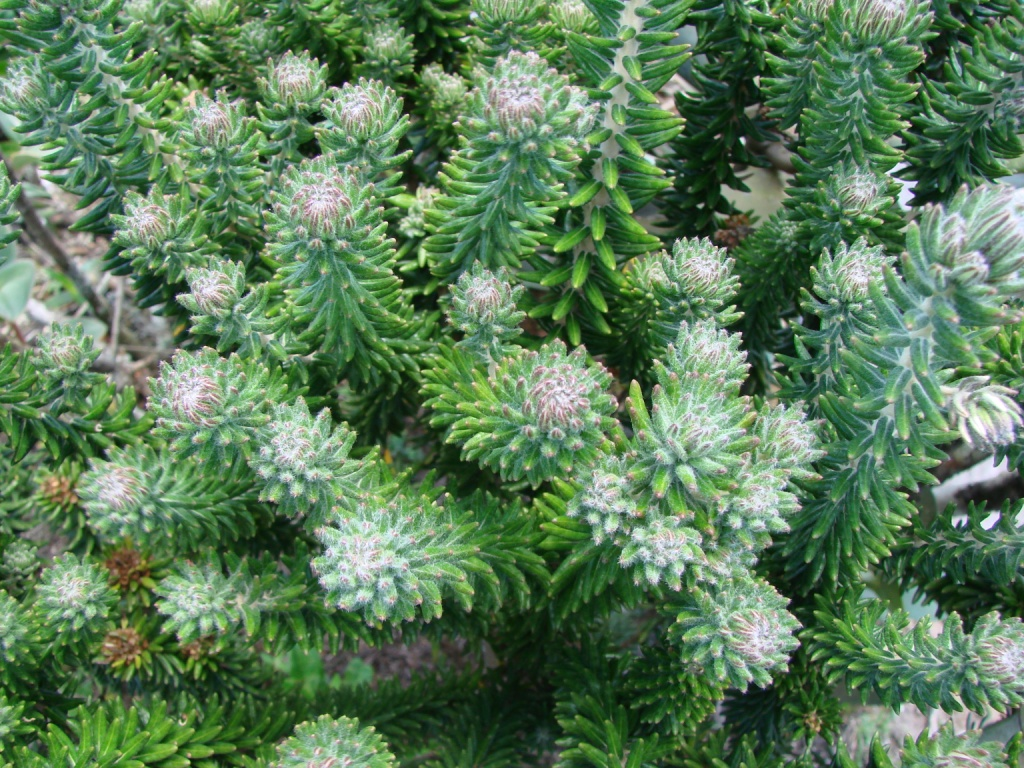
- Lychnophorella triflora

Scientific classification
- Kingdom: Plantae
- Clade: Tracheophytes
- Clade: Angiosperms
- Clade: Eudicots
- Clade: Asterids
- Order: Asterales
- Family: Asteraceae
- Subfamily: Vernonioideae
- Tribe: Vernonieae
- Subtribe: Lychnophorinae
- Genus: Lychnophorella; Loeuille, Semir & Pirani

Species
- 11; see text

= Lychnophorella =

Genus of flowering plants

Lychnophorella is a genus of flowering plants in the family Asteraceae. It includes 11 species endemic to northeastern Brazil.

== Species ==
11 species are accepted.

- Lychnophorella bishopii (H.Rob.) Loeuille, Semir & Pirani
- Lychnophorella blanchetii (Sch.Bip.) Loeuille, Semir & Pirani
- Lychnophorella hindii J.B.Cândido & Loeuille
- Lychnophorella jacobinensis Loeuille, Semir & Pirani
- Lychnophorella leucodendron (Mattf.) Loeuille, Semir & Pirani
- Lychnophorella morii (H.Rob.) Loeuille, Semir & Pirani
- Lychnophorella regis (H.Rob.) Loeuille, Semir & Pirani
- Lychnophorella santosii (H.Rob.) Loeuille, Semir & Pirani
- Lychnophorella saxicola J.B.Cândido & Loeuille
- Lychnophorella sericea (D.J.N.Hind) Loeuille, Semir & Pirani
- Lychnophorella triflora (Mattf.) Loeuille, Semir & Pirani
