= Bolanosa =

Scientific classification
- Kingdom: Plantae
- Clade: Tracheophytes
- Clade: Angiosperms
- Clade: Eudicots
- Clade: Asterids
- Order: Asterales
- Family: Asteraceae
- Subfamily: Cichorioideae
- Tribe: Vernonieae
- Genus: Bolanosa; A.Gray
- Species: B. coulteri

Binomial name
- Bolanosa coulteri A.Gray

Genus of plants

Bolanosa is a genus of flowering plants in the family Asteraceae. It contains a single species, Bolanosa coulteri.
