= Mattfeldanthus =

Scientific classification
- Kingdom: Plantae
- Clade: Tracheophytes
- Clade: Angiosperms
- Clade: Eudicots
- Clade: Asterids
- Order: Asterales
- Family: Asteraceae
- Subfamily: Cichorioideae
- Tribe: Vernonieae
- Genus: Mattfeldanthus; H.Rob. & R.M.King

Type species
- Mattfeldanthus mutisioides H.Rob. & R.M.King

Genus of flowering plants

Mattfeldanthus is a genus of Brazilian flowering plants in the tribe Vernonieae within the family Asteraceae.

Species

- Mattfeldanthus andrade-limae (G.M.Barroso) Dematt. - Pernambuco
- Mattfeldanthus mutisioides H.Rob. & R.M.King - Bahia
