= Lychnophoriopsis =

Scientific classification
- Kingdom: Plantae
- Clade: Tracheophytes
- Clade: Angiosperms
- Clade: Eudicots
- Clade: Asterids
- Order: Asterales
- Family: Asteraceae
- Subfamily: Cichorioideae
- Tribe: Vernonieae
- Genus: Lychnophoriopsis; Sch.Bip.

Type species
- Lychnophoriopsis heterotheca Sch.Bip.

Synonyms
- Episcothamnus H.Rob.

Genus of flowering plants

Lychnophoriopsis is a genus of Brazilian plants in the family Asteraceae.

Species

All the known species are endemic to the State of Minas Gerais in Brazil.

- Lychnophoriopsis candelabrum (Sch.Bip.) H.Rob.
- Lychnophoriopsis damazioi (Beauverd) H.Rob.
- Lychnophoriopsis hatschbachii H.Rob.
- Lychnophoriopsis heterotheca Sch.Bip.
