= Pseudopiptocarpha =

Scientific classification
- Kingdom: Plantae
- Clade: Tracheophytes
- Clade: Angiosperms
- Clade: Eudicots
- Clade: Asterids
- Order: Asterales
- Family: Asteraceae
- Subfamily: Vernonioideae
- Tribe: Vernonieae
- Genus: Pseudopiptocarpha; H.Rob.

Species
- 4; see text

Genus of flowering plants

Pseudopiptocarpha is a genus of flowering plants in the family Asteraceae. It includes four species native to Colombia and Venezuela.

- Pseudopiptocarpha elaeagnoides (Kunth) H.Rob.
- Pseudopiptocarpha garcia-barrigae H.Rob. & S.C.Keeley
- Pseudopiptocarpha schultzii (H.Karst. ex Sch.Bip.) H.Rob.
- Pseudopiptocarpha tovarensis (Gleason) H.Rob. & S.C.Keeley
