= Rastrophyllum =

Scientific classification
- Kingdom: Plantae
- Clade: Tracheophytes
- Clade: Angiosperms
- Clade: Eudicots
- Clade: Asterids
- Order: Asterales
- Family: Asteraceae
- Subfamily: Cichorioideae
- Tribe: Vernonieae
- Genus: Rastrophyllum; Wild & G.V.Pope

Type species
- Rastrophyllum pinnatipartitum Wild & G.V.Pope

Genus of plants

Rastrophyllum is a genus of African plants in the tribe Vernonieae within the family Asteraceae.

Species

- Rastrophyllum apiifolium M.G.Gilbert - Tanzania
- Rastrophyllum pinnatipartitum Wild & G.V.Pope - Zambia
