= Piptolepis =

Scientific classification
- Kingdom: Plantae
- Clade: Tracheophytes
- Clade: Angiosperms
- Clade: Eudicots
- Clade: Asterids
- Order: Asterales
- Family: Asteraceae
- Subfamily: Cichorioideae
- Tribe: Vernonieae
- Genus: Piptolepis; Sch.Bip.

Type species
- Piptolepis ericoides Sch.Bip.

Genus of plants

Piptolepis is a genus of flowering plants in the family Asteraceae.

== Species ==
Species accepted by the Plants of the World Online as of March 2023:

- Piptolepis buxoides Sch.Bip.
- Piptolepis campestris Semir & Loeuille
- Piptolepis ericoides Sch.Bip.
- Piptolepis gardneri Baker
- Piptolepis glaziouana Beauverd
- Piptolepis imbricata Sch.Bip.
- Piptolepis leptospermoides Sch.Bip.
- Piptolepis monticola Loeuille
- Piptolepis oleaster (DC.) Sch.Bip.
- Piptolepis pabstii (G.M.Barroso) Loeuille, Semir & Pirani
- Piptolepis pseudomyrtus (A.St.-Hil.) Sch.Bip.
- Piptolepis riparia Loeuille, Semir & Pirani
- Piptolepis rosmarinifolia Bringel, J.B.Cândido & Loeuille
- Piptolepis schultziana Loeuille & D.J.N.Hind
