= Cololobus =

Scientific classification
- Kingdom: Plantae
- Clade: Tracheophytes
- Clade: Angiosperms
- Clade: Eudicots
- Clade: Asterids
- Order: Asterales
- Family: Asteraceae
- Subfamily: Cichorioideae
- Tribe: Vernonieae
- Genus: Cololobus; H.Rob.

Genus of flowering plants

Cololobus is a genus of flowering plants belonging to the family Asteraceae.

Its native range is Southeastern Brazil.

Species:

- Cololobus argenteus M.Monge & Semir
- Cololobus hatschbachii H.Rob.
- Cololobus longiangustatus (G.M.Barroso) H.Rob.
- Cololobus rupestris (Gardner) H.Rob.
