= Dasyandantha =

Scientific classification
- Kingdom: Plantae
- Clade: Tracheophytes
- Clade: Angiosperms
- Clade: Eudicots
- Clade: Asterids
- Order: Asterales
- Family: Asteraceae
- Subfamily: Cichorioideae
- Tribe: Vernonieae
- Genus: Dasyandantha; H.Rob.
- Species: D. cuatrecasasiana

Binomial name
- Dasyandantha cuatrecasasiana (Aristeg.) H.Rob.

Genus of flowering plants

Dasyandantha is a genus of flowering plants belonging to the family Asteraceae. It contains a single species, Dasyandantha cuatrecasasiana.

Its native range is Venezuela.
