= Ageratinastrum =

Scientific classification
- Kingdom: Plantae
- Clade: Embryophytes
- Clade: Tracheophytes
- Clade: Angiosperms
- Clade: Eudicots
- Clade: Asterids
- Order: Asterales
- Family: Asteraceae
- Tribe: Vernonieae
- Genus: Ageratinastrum; Mattf.

Genus of flowering plants

Ageratinastrum is a group of plants in the family Asteraceae described as a genus in 1932.

The genus is native to tropical Africa.

== Species ==
- Ageratinastrum goetzeanum (O.Hoffm.) Mattf.
- Ageratinastrum katangense Lisowski
- Ageratinastrum lejolyanum (Adamska & Lisowski) Kalanda
- Ageratinastrum palustre Wild & G.V.Pope
- Ageratinastrum polyphyllum (Baker) Mattf.
