= Trepadonia =

Scientific classification
- Kingdom: Plantae
- Clade: Tracheophytes
- Clade: Angiosperms
- Clade: Eudicots
- Clade: Asterids
- Order: Asterales
- Family: Asteraceae
- Subfamily: Cichorioideae
- Tribe: Vernonieae
- Genus: Trepadonia; H.Rob.

Genus of flowering plants

Trepadonia is a genus of flowering plants belonging to the family Asteraceae.

Its native range is Peru.

Species:

- Trepadonia mexiae (H.Rob.) H.Rob.
- Trepadonia oppositifolia H.Rob. & H.Beltrán
