= Vinicia tomentosa =

Scientific classification
- Kingdom: Plantae
- Clade: Tracheophytes
- Clade: Angiosperms
- Clade: Eudicots
- Clade: Asterids
- Order: Asterales
- Family: Asteraceae
- Subfamily: Cichorioideae
- Tribe: Vernonieae
- Genus: Vinicia; Dematt.
- Species: V. tomentosa

Binomial name
- Vinicia tomentosa Dematt.

Genus of flowering plants

Vinicia is a genus of flowering plants belonging to the family Asteraceae. The only species is Vinicia tomentosa.

Its native range is Southeastern Brazil.
