= Heterocypsela =

Scientific classification
- Kingdom: Plantae
- Clade: Tracheophytes
- Clade: Angiosperms
- Clade: Eudicots
- Clade: Asterids
- Order: Asterales
- Family: Asteraceae
- Subfamily: Cichorioideae
- Tribe: Vernonieae
- Genus: Heterocypsela; H.Rob.

Species
- Heterocypsela andersonii H.Rob.; Heterocypsela brachylepis J.N.Nakaj. & D.Marques

Genus of flowering plants

Heterocypsela is a genus of flowering plants in the family Asteraceae. It is native to Brazil.

Species

- Heterocypsela andersonii H.Rob.
- Heterocypsela brachylepis J.N.Nakaj. & D.Marques
