= Myanmaria =

Scientific classification
- Kingdom: Plantae
- Clade: Tracheophytes
- Clade: Angiosperms
- Clade: Eudicots
- Clade: Asterids
- Order: Asterales
- Family: Asteraceae
- Subfamily: Vernonioideae
- Tribe: Vernonieae
- Genus: Myanmaria; H.Rob.
- Species: M. calycina

Binomial name
- Myanmaria calycina (Wall. ex DC.) H.Rob.

Synonyms
- Vernonia calycina Wall. ex DC.

Genus of flowering plants

Myanmaria is a genus of flowering plants in the family Asteraceae. It includes a single species, Myanmaria calycina, which is endemic to Myanmar.

The species was first described as Vernonia calycina in 1836. In 1999 Harold E. Robinson placed the species in the new monotypic genus Myanmaria as Myanmaria calycina.
