= Omphalopappus =

Scientific classification
- Kingdom: Plantae
- Clade: Tracheophytes
- Clade: Angiosperms
- Clade: Eudicots
- Clade: Asterids
- Order: Asterales
- Family: Asteraceae
- Subfamily: Vernonioideae
- Tribe: Vernonieae
- Genus: Omphalopappus; O.Hoffm.
- Species: O. newtonii

Binomial name
- Omphalopappus newtonii O.Hoffm.

Genus of flowering plants

Omphalopappus is a genus of flowering plants in the tribe Vernonieae within the family Asteraceae.

Species

The only known species is Omphalopappus newtonii. It is native to Angola.
