= Herderia =

Scientific classification
- Kingdom: Plantae
- Clade: Tracheophytes
- Clade: Angiosperms
- Clade: Eudicots
- Clade: Asterids
- Order: Asterales
- Family: Asteraceae
- Subfamily: Cichorioideae
- Tribe: Vernonieae
- Genus: Herderia; Cass.
- Species: H. truncata

Binomial name
- Herderia truncata Cass.

Synonyms
- Herderia truncata var. chevalieri O.Hoffm.; Ampherephis senegalensis Less.

Genus of flowering plants

Herderia is a genus of flowering plants in the family Asteraceae.

Species

There is only one accepted species, Herderia truncata, native to West Africa from Sierra Leone to Chad and Mali.
