= Kinghamia =

Scientific classification
- Kingdom: Plantae
- Clade: Tracheophytes
- Clade: Angiosperms
- Clade: Eudicots
- Clade: Asterids
- Order: Asterales
- Family: Asteraceae
- Subfamily: Cichorioideae
- Tribe: Vernonieae
- Genus: Kinghamia; C.Jeffrey

Type species
- Oiospermum nigritanum Benth.

Genus of flowering plants

Kinghamia is a genus of African flowering plants in the family Asteraceae.

Species

- Kinghamia angustifolia (Benth.) C.Jeffrey
- Kinghamia engleriana (Muschl.) C.Jeffrey
- Kinghamia foliosa (O.Hoffm.) C.Jeffrey
- Kinghamia macrocephala (Oliv. & Hiern) C.Jeffrey
- Kinghamia nigritana (Benth.) C.Jeffrey
