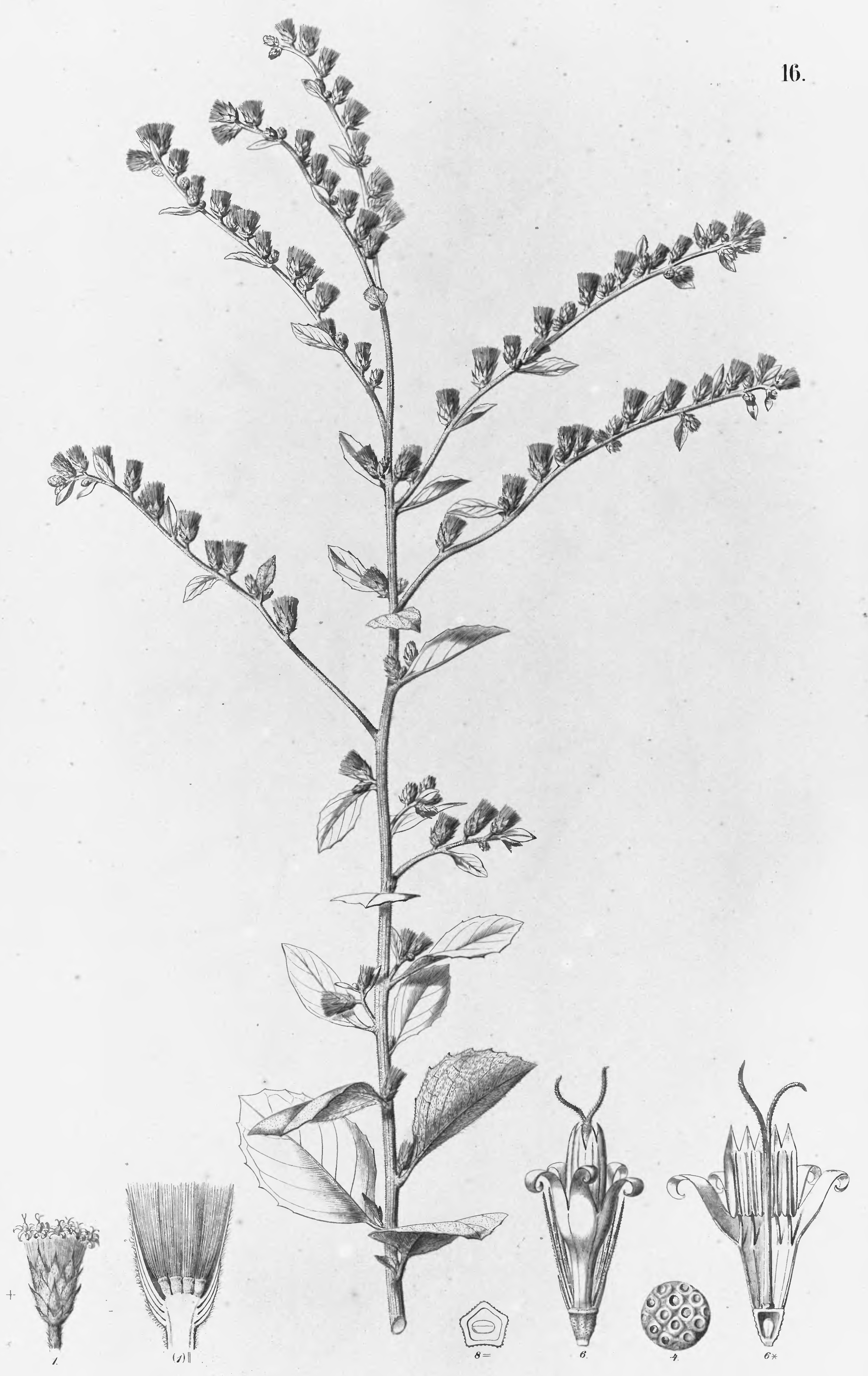

Scientific classification
- Kingdom: Plantae
- Clade: Tracheophytes
- Clade: Angiosperms
- Clade: Eudicots
- Clade: Asterids
- Order: Asterales
- Family: Asteraceae
- Subfamily: Cichorioideae
- Tribe: Vernonieae
- Genus: Acilepidopsis; H.Rob.
- Species: A. echtifolia

Binomial name
- Acilepidopsis echtifolia (Mart. ex DC.) H.Rob.

= Acilepidopsis =

Genus of flowering plants

Acilepidopsis is a monotypic genus in the Asteraceae family of flowering plants. It contains only the species Acilepidopsis echtifolia and is found in South America.
