= Pulicarioidea =

Scientific classification
- Kingdom: Plantae
- Clade: Tracheophytes
- Clade: Angiosperms
- Clade: Eudicots
- Clade: Asterids
- Order: Asterales
- Family: Asteraceae
- Subfamily: Vernonioideae
- Tribe: Vernonieae
- Genus: Pulicarioidea; Bunwong, Chantar. & S.C.Keeley
- Species: P. annamica

Binomial name
- Pulicarioidea annamica (Gagnep.) Bunwong, Chantar. & S.C.Keeley

Synonyms
- Pulicaria annamica Gagnep. (1921) (basionym); Vernonia annamica (Gagnep.) Merr.; Vernonia pulicarioides Gagnep.

Genus of flowering plants

Pulicarioidea is a genus of flowering plants in the family Asteraceae. It includes a single species, Pulicarioidea annamica, a perennial native to Laos, Myanmar, Thailand, and Vietnam.

The species was first described as Pulicaria annamica by François Gagnepain in 1921. In 2014 Sukhonthip Bunwong, Pranom Chantaranothai, and Sterling C. Keeley placed it in the new monotypic genus Pulicarioidea as Pulicarioidea annamica.
