= Brachythrix =

Scientific classification
- Kingdom: Plantae
- Clade: Embryophytes
- Clade: Tracheophytes
- Clade: Angiosperms
- Clade: Eudicots
- Clade: Asterids
- Order: Asterales
- Family: Asteraceae
- Subfamily: Vernonioideae
- Tribe: Vernonieae
- Genus: Brachythrix; Wild & G.V.Pope

Type species
- Brachythrix stolzii (S.Moore) Wild & G.V.Pope

Genus of flowering plants

Brachythrix is a genus of flowering plants in the family Asteraceae. They are native to tropical south-central and eastern Africa.

These are perennial herbs that produce new stems annually from a woody, sometimes woolly-tufted rootstock. The roots may have tubers. The stem usually branches and has many alternately arranged leaves. The herbage is hairy, with several different types of long and short hairs. The flower heads are solitary, clustered, or arranged in cymes. They contain purple disc florets. The fruit is an angular, gland-dotted cypsela with a pappus of scales or short barbed hairs.

Species

- Brachythrix brevipapposa
- Brachythrix glomerata
- Brachythrix lugarensis
- Brachythrix malawiensis
- Brachythrix pawekiae
- Brachythrix sonchoides
- Brachythrix stolzii
