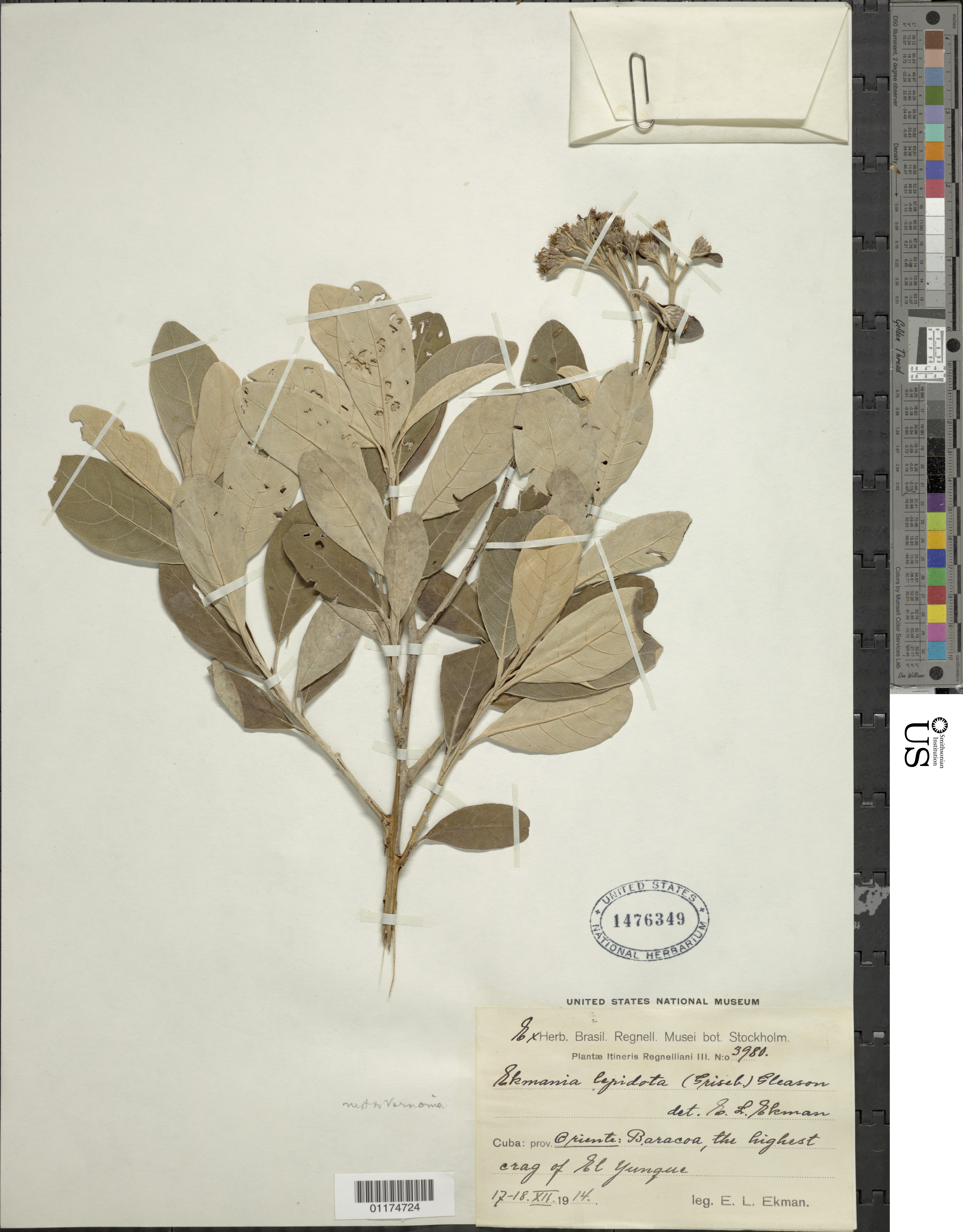

Scientific classification
- Kingdom: Plantae
- Clade: Tracheophytes
- Clade: Angiosperms
- Clade: Eudicots
- Clade: Asterids
- Order: Asterales
- Family: Asteraceae
- Subfamily: Vernonioideae
- Tribe: Vernonieae
- Genus: Ekmania; Gleason
- Species: E. lepidota

Binomial name
- Ekmania lepidota (Griseb.) Gleason

Synonyms
- Vernonia lepidota Griseb.

= Ekmania =

Genus of flowering plants in the daisy family

Ekmania is a genus of flowering plants in the family Asteraceae. It contains only one known species, Ekmania lepidota, endemic to Cuba.

The genus is named in honor of botanist Erik L. Ekman of Harvard University.
