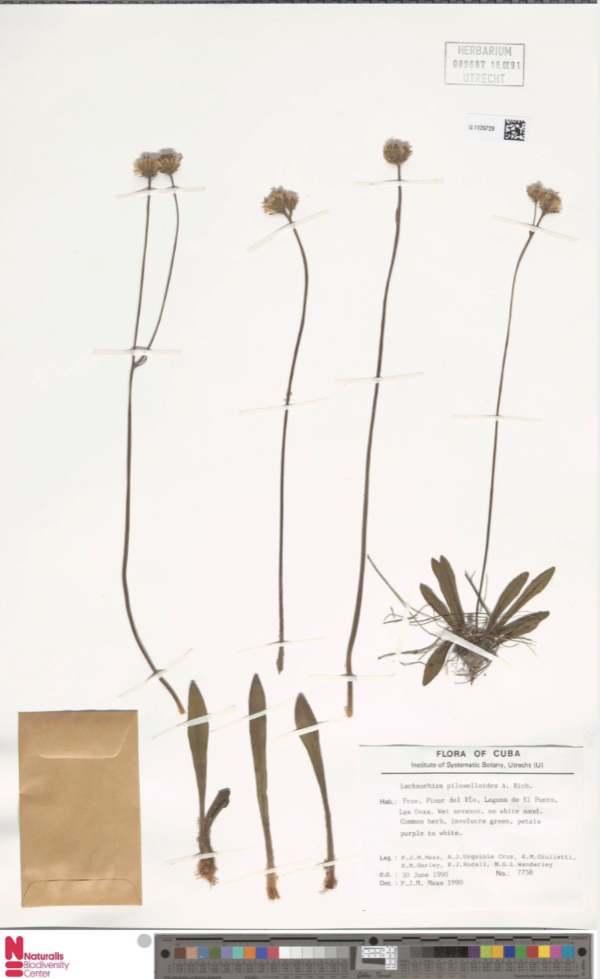
- Lachnorhiza piloselloides

Scientific classification
- Kingdom: Plantae
- Clade: Tracheophytes
- Clade: Angiosperms
- Clade: Eudicots
- Clade: Asterids
- Order: Asterales
- Family: Asteraceae
- Subfamily: Cichorioideae
- Tribe: Vernonieae
- Genus: Lachnorhiza; A.Rich.

Type species
- Lachnorhiza piloselloides A.Rich.

= Lachnorhiza =

Genus of flowering plants

Lachnorhiza is a genus of Cuban flowering plants in the family Asteraceae.

Species

- Lachnorhiza micrantha (Borhidi) Borhidi - Pinar del Río Province in Cuba
- Lachnorhiza piloselloides A.Rich. - Isla de la Juventud in Cuba
