= Paurolepis =

Scientific classification
- Kingdom: Plantae
- Clade: Tracheophytes
- Clade: Angiosperms
- Clade: Eudicots
- Clade: Asterids
- Order: Asterales
- Family: Asteraceae
- Subfamily: Vernonioideae
- Tribe: Vernonieae
- Genus: Paurolepis; S.Moore
- Species: P. filifolia

Binomial name
- Paurolepis filifolia (R.E.Fr.) Wild & G.V.Pope

Synonyms
- Gutenbergia filifolia (R.E.Fr.) C.Jeffrey; Herderia filifolia R.E.Fr.; Paurolepis angusta S.Moore

Genus of flowering plants

Paurolepis is a genus of flowering plants in the family Asteraceae. It includes a single species, Paurolepis filifolia, a bushy perennial herb which grows up to 60 cm tall from a woody rootstock. It is native to the Democratic Republic of the Congo and Zambia, where it grows on rocky hillsides and rock outcrops in miombo woodland.
