= Lampropappus =

Scientific classification
- Kingdom: Plantae
- Clade: Tracheophytes
- Clade: Angiosperms
- Clade: Eudicots
- Clade: Asterids
- Order: Asterales
- Family: Asteraceae
- Subfamily: Cichorioideae
- Tribe: Vernonieae
- Genus: Lampropappus (O.Hoffm.) H.Rob.

Genus of plants

Lampropappus is a genus of flowering plants belonging to the family Asteraceae.

Its native range is Tanzania to South Tropical Africa.

Species:

- Lampropappus eremanthifolia (O.Hoffm.) H.Rob.
- Lampropappus hoffmannii H.Rob.
- Lampropappus turbinellus (S.Moore) H.Rob.
