= Telmatophila =

Scientific classification
- Kingdom: Plantae
- Clade: Embryophytes
- Clade: Tracheophytes
- Clade: Angiosperms
- Clade: Eudicots
- Clade: Asterids
- Order: Asterales
- Family: Asteraceae
- Subfamily: Vernonioideae
- Tribe: Vernonieae
- Genus: Telmatophila; Mart. ex Baker
- Species: T. scolymastrum

Binomial name
- Telmatophila scolymastrum Mart. ex Baker

Genus of plants

Telmatophila is a genus of flowering plants in the tribe Vernonieae within the family Asteraceae.

Species

The only known species is Telmatophila scolymastrum, native to the State of Piauí in eastern Brazil.
