= Mesanthophora =

Scientific classification
- Kingdom: Plantae
- Clade: Tracheophytes
- Clade: Angiosperms
- Clade: Eudicots
- Clade: Asterids
- Order: Asterales
- Family: Asteraceae
- Subfamily: Vernonioideae
- Tribe: Vernonieae
- Genus: Mesanthophora; H.Rob.

Species
- Mesanthophora brunneri H.Rob.; Mesanthophora rojasii (Cabrera) H.Rob.

Genus of flowering plants

Mesanthophora is a genus of flowering plants in the family Asteraceae. It includes two species native to Bolivia, Paraguay, and west-central and southeastern Brazil.

- Mesanthophora brunneri H.Rob. – northeastern Paraguay
- Mesanthophora rojasii (Cabrera) H.Rob. – eastern Bolivia, Paraguay, and central Brazil
