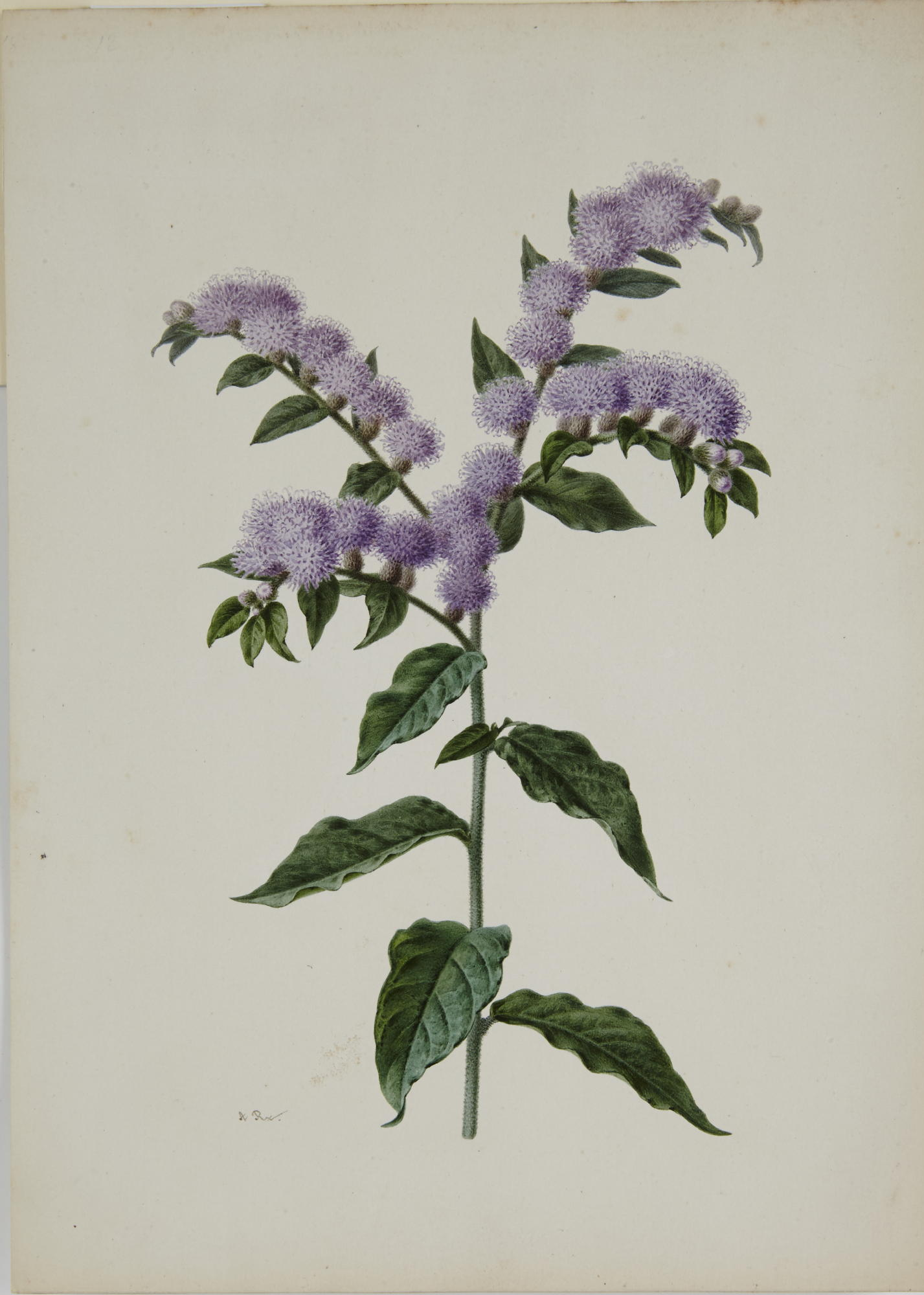
- Cyrtocymura scorpioides

Scientific classification
- Kingdom: Plantae
- Clade: Tracheophytes
- Clade: Angiosperms
- Clade: Eudicots
- Clade: Asterids
- Order: Asterales
- Family: Asteraceae
- Subfamily: Vernonioideae
- Tribe: Vernonieae
- Genus: Cyrtocymura; H.Rob.

Type species
- Conyza scorpioides Lam.

= Cyrtocymura =

Genus of flowering plants

Cyrtocymura is a genus of Latin American and Caribbean plants in the tribe Vernonieae within the family Asteraceae.

Species

- Cyrtocymura cincta (Griseb.) H.Rob. - Bolivia (Santa Cruz, Tarija, Cochabamba, Chuquisaca), Argentina (Jujuy), Brazil (Mato Grosso do Sul), Paraguay (Paraguarí, Amambay)
- Cyrtocymura harleyi (H.Rob.) H.Rob. - Bahia
- Cyrtocymura lanuginosa (Gardner) H.Rob. - Minas Gerais
- Cyrtocymura mattos-silvae (H.Rob.) H.Rob. - Bahia
- Cyrtocymura saepia (Ekman) H.Rob. - Haiti
- Cyrtocymura scorpioides (Lam.) H.Rob. - South America from Colombia to Uruguay; Central America; Mexico (Chiapas + Yucatán Peninsula; Trinidad and Tobago; Hispaniola
