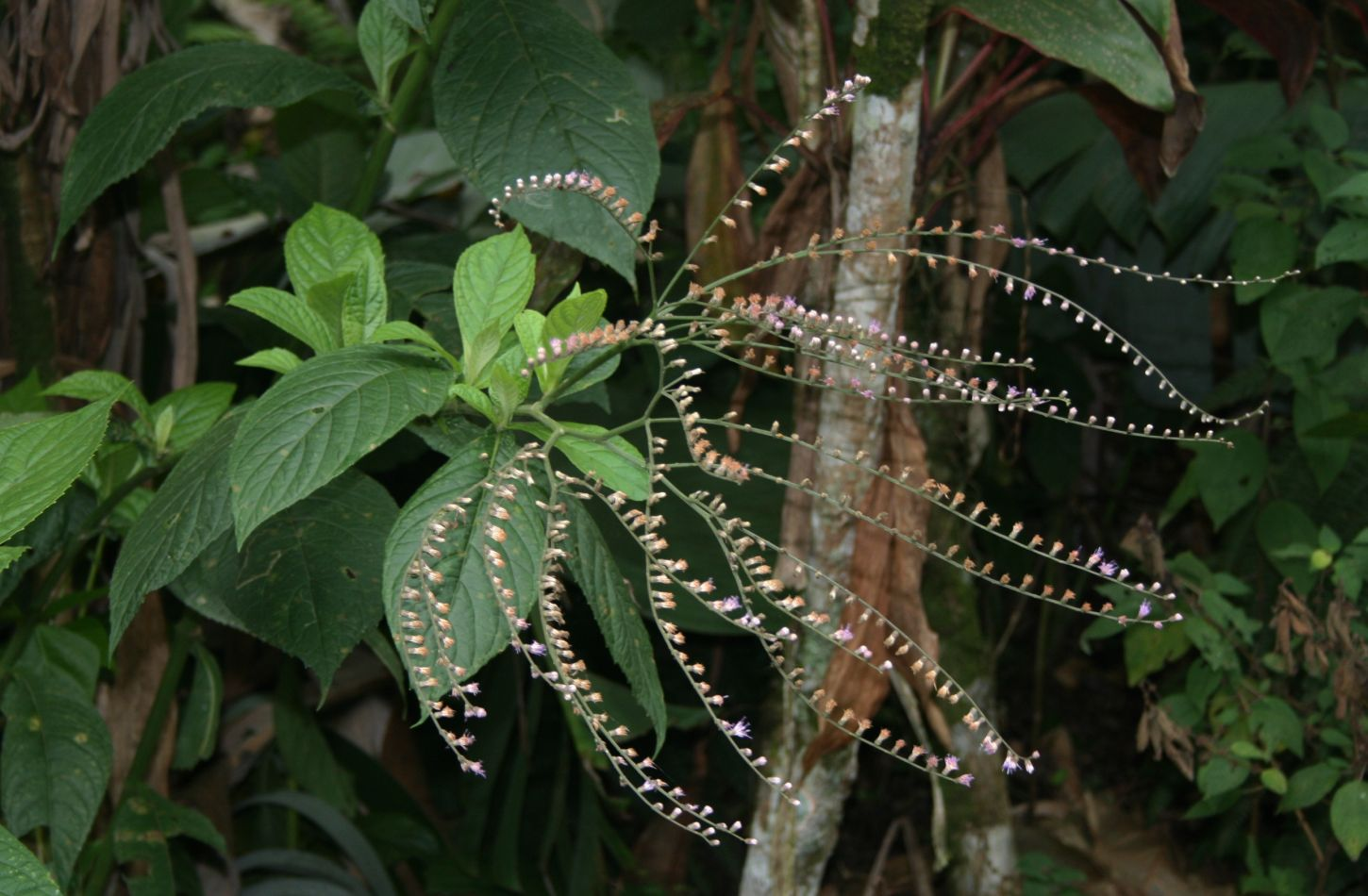
- Eirmocephala brachiata
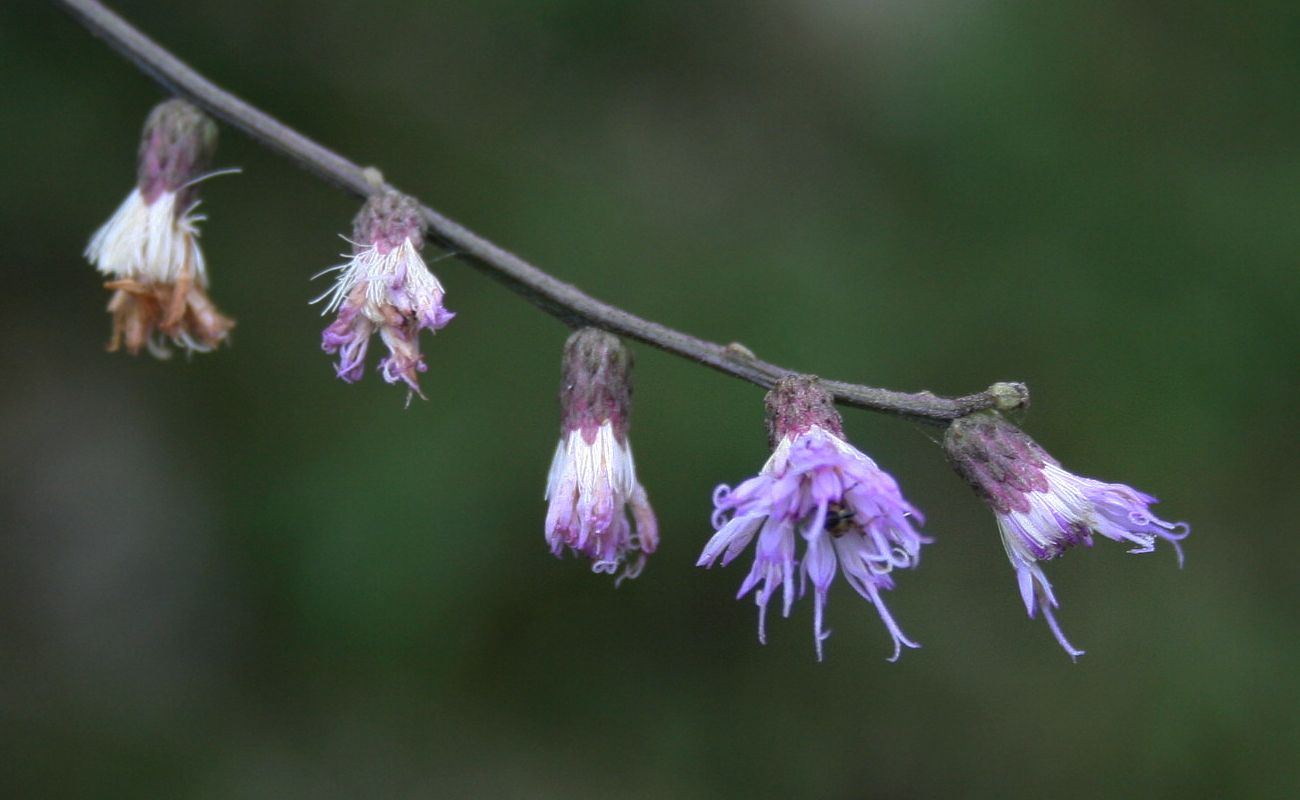
- Eirmocephala brachiata

Scientific classification
- Kingdom: Plantae
- Clade: Tracheophytes
- Clade: Angiosperms
- Clade: Eudicots
- Clade: Asterids
- Order: Asterales
- Family: Asteraceae
- Subfamily: Cichorioideae
- Tribe: Vernonieae
- Genus: Eirmocephala; H.Rob.

Type species
- Vernonia brachiata Benth.

= Eirmocephala =

Genus of flowering plants

Eirmocephala is a genus of Latin American plants in the tribe Vernonieae within the family Asteraceae.

Species

- Eirmocephala brachiata (Benth. ex Oerst.) H.Rob. - Costa Rica, Panama, Colombia, Venezuela, Ecuador, Peru
- Eirmocephala cainarachiensis (Hieron.) H.Rob. - Ecuador, Peru
- Eirmocephala megaphylla (Hieron.) H.Rob. - Bolivia, Peru
