= Diaphractanthus =

Scientific classification
- Kingdom: Plantae
- Clade: Tracheophytes
- Clade: Angiosperms
- Clade: Eudicots
- Clade: Asterids
- Order: Asterales
- Family: Asteraceae
- Subfamily: Cichorioideae
- Tribe: Vernonieae
- Genus: Diaphractanthus; Humbert
- Species: D. bomolepis

Binomial name
- Diaphractanthus bomolepis Humbert

Synonyms
- Diaphractanthus homolepis Humbert, superfluous synonym

Genus of flowering plants

Diaphractanthus is a genus of flowering plants in the family Asteraceae.

There is only one known species, Diaphractanthus bomolepis, endemic to Madagascar.

Some sources give the epithet as "homolepis" instead of "bomolepis". The original 1923 publication spelled it with a "b" alongside the description but with an "h" in the figure caption on the same page.
