= Msuata =

Scientific classification
- Kingdom: Plantae
- Clade: Embryophytes
- Clade: Tracheophytes
- Clade: Angiosperms
- Clade: Eudicots
- Clade: Asterids
- Order: Asterales
- Family: Asteraceae
- Subfamily: Vernonioideae
- Tribe: Vernonieae
- Genus: Msuata; O.Hoffm.
- Species: M. buettneri

Binomial name
- Msuata buettneri O.Hoffm.

Genus of flowering plants

Msuata is a genus of flowering plants in the tribe Vernonieae within the family Asteraceae.

Species

There is only one known species, Msuata buettneri, endemic to Zaire in Central Africa.
