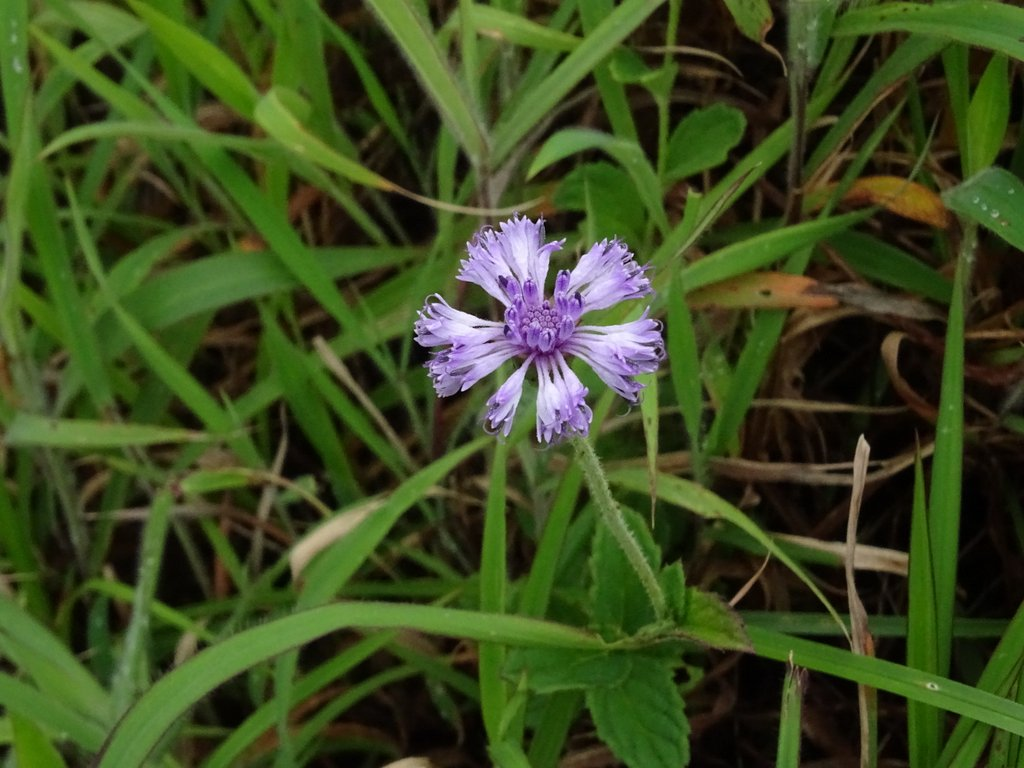

Scientific classification
- Kingdom: Plantae
- Clade: Tracheophytes
- Clade: Angiosperms
- Clade: Eudicots
- Clade: Asterids
- Order: Asterales
- Family: Asteraceae
- Subfamily: Cichorioideae
- Tribe: Vernonieae
- Genus: Adenoon; Dalzell
- Species: A. indicum

Binomial name
- Adenoon indicum Dalzell

= Adenoon =

Genus of flowering plants

Adenoon is a genus of flowering plants in the family Asteraceae described in 1850.

There is only one known species, Adenoon indicum, native to the Western Ghats (Maharashtra, Goa, Karnataka, Tamil Nadu and Kerala) of southwestern India.
