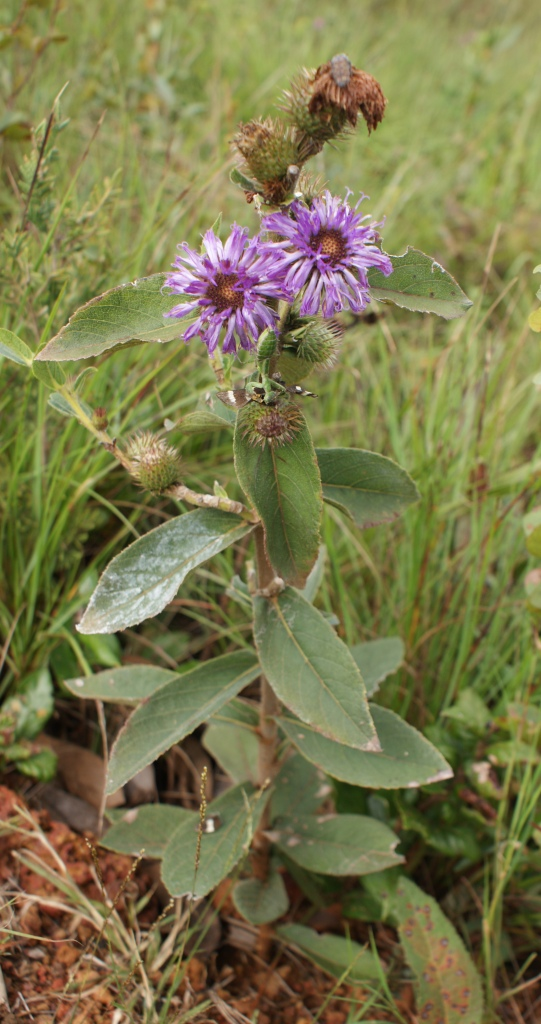
- Lessingianthus roseus

Scientific classification
- Kingdom: Plantae
- Clade: Tracheophytes
- Clade: Angiosperms
- Clade: Eudicots
- Clade: Asterids
- Order: Asterales
- Family: Asteraceae
- Subfamily: Vernonioideae
- Tribe: Vernonieae
- Genus: Lessingianthus; H.Rob.

Type species
- Vernonia argyrophylla Less.

Synonyms
- Argyrophyllum Pohl ex Baker

= Lessingianthus =

Genus of flowering plants

Lessingianthus is a genus of plants in the family Asteraceae. Species of the genus are native to South America.

== Species ==
The following species are recognised in the genus Lessingianthus:

- Lessingianthus adenophyllus (Mart. ex DC.) H.Rob.
- Lessingianthus alegretensis Deble & Matielo
- Lessingianthus ammophilus (Gardner) H.Rob.
- Lessingianthus arachniolepis (Ekman & Dusén) H.Rob.
- Lessingianthus araneosus (Baker) A.M.Teles
- Lessingianthus arctatus Dematt.
- Lessingianthus argenteus (Less.) H.Rob.
- Lessingianthus argyrophyllus (Less.) H.Rob.
- Lessingianthus asteriflorus (Mart. ex DC.) H.Rob.
- Lessingianthus bakerianus Dematt.
- Lessingianthus bardanoides (Less.) H.Rob.
- Lessingianthus barrosoanus Dematt.
- Lessingianthus bellulus (Dematt.) M.B.Angulo
- Lessingianthus bishopii (H.Rob.) H.Rob.
- Lessingianthus brevifolius (Less.) H.Rob.
- Lessingianthus brevipetiolatus (Sch.Bip. ex Baker) H.Rob.
- Lessingianthus buddleiifolius (Mart. ex DC.) H.Rob.
- Lessingianthus bupleurifolius (DC.) H.Rob.
- Lessingianthus caiapoensis (H.Rob.) H.Rob.
- Lessingianthus carduoides (Baker) H.Rob.
- Lessingianthus carvalhoi (H.Rob.) H.Rob.
- Lessingianthus cataractarum (Hieron.) H.Rob.
- Lessingianthus centauropsideus (Hieron.) M.B.Angulo & Dematt.
- Lessingianthus cephalotes (DC.) H.Rob.
- Lessingianthus chamaepeuces (Sch.Bip. ex Baker) H.Rob.
- Lessingianthus cipoensis Dematt.
- Lessingianthus clavatus (Gardner) Dematt.
- Lessingianthus compactiflorus (Mart. ex Baker) H.Rob.
- Lessingianthus concepcionis M.B.Angulo & Dematt.
- Lessingianthus constrictus (Matzenb. & Mafiol.) Dematt.
- Lessingianthus cordiger (Mart. ex DC.) H.Rob.
- Lessingianthus coriaceus (Less.) H.Rob.
- Lessingianthus coriarius M.B.Angulo
- Lessingianthus correntinus (Cabrera & Cristóbal) Dematt.
- Lessingianthus cristalinae (H.Rob.) H.Rob.
- Lessingianthus declivium (Malme) Dematt.
- Lessingianthus dichrous (Mart. ex Colla) P.L.R.Moraes & Guglielmone
- Lessingianthus durus (Mart. ex DC.) H.Rob.
- Lessingianthus eitenii (H.Rob.) H.Rob.
- Lessingianthus elegans (Gardner) H.Rob.
- Lessingianthus erythrophilus (DC.) H.Rob.
- Lessingianthus exiguus (Cabrera) H.Rob.
- Lessingianthus farinosus (Baker) H.Rob.
- Lessingianthus floccosus (Gardner) H.Rob.
- Lessingianthus flotowioides (Baker) Dematt.
- Lessingianthus foliosus Dematt.
- Lessingianthus fonsecae (H.Rob.) H.Rob.
- Lessingianthus glabratus (Less.) H.Rob.
- Lessingianthus glaziovianus (Baker) H.Rob.
- Lessingianthus gonzalezii S.Díaz & Obando
- Lessingianthus graminifolius (Gardner) Dematt.
- Lessingianthus grandiflorus (Less.) H.Rob.
- Lessingianthus grearii (H.Rob.) H.Rob.
- Lessingianthus hasslerianus (Chodat) M.B.Angulo
- Lessingianthus hatschbachii H.Rob.
- Lessingianthus heringeri (H.Rob.) H.Rob.
- Lessingianthus hoveifolius (Gardner) H.Rob.
- Lessingianthus hypochaeris (DC.) H.Rob.
- Lessingianthus hystricosus (Cabrera & Dematt.) Dematt.
- Lessingianthus ibitipocensis Borges & Dematt.
- Lessingianthus irwinii (G.M.Barroso) H.Rob.
- Lessingianthus ixiamensis (Rusby) H.Rob.
- Lessingianthus lacunosus (Mart. ex DC.) H.Rob.
- Lessingianthus laevigatus (Mart. ex DC.) H.Rob.
- Lessingianthus lanatus (Chodat) Dematt.
- Lessingianthus laniferus (Cristóbal & Dematt.) M.B.Angulo
- Lessingianthus lanuginosus Dematt.
- Lessingianthus lapinhensis Dematt.
- Lessingianthus laurifolius (DC.) H.Rob.
- Lessingianthus ligulifolius (Mart. ex DC.) H.Rob.
- Lessingianthus linearifolius (Less.) H.Rob.
- Lessingianthus linearis (Spreng.) H.Rob.
- Lessingianthus longicuspis Dematt.
- Lessingianthus lorentzii (Hieron.) H.Rob.
- Lessingianthus macrocephalus (Less.) H.Rob.
- Lessingianthus macrophyllus (Less.) H.Rob.
- Lessingianthus magnificus Deble, Dematt. & Marchiori
- Lessingianthus mansoanus (Baker) H.Rob.
- Lessingianthus membranifolius M.B.Angulo
- Lessingianthus minimus Dematt.
- Lessingianthus mollissimus (D.Don ex Hook. & Arn.) H.Rob.
- Lessingianthus monocephalus (Gardner) H.Rob.
- Lessingianthus morii (H.Rob.) H.Rob.
- Lessingianthus morilloi (V.M.Badillo) H.Rob.
- Lessingianthus myrsinites H.Rob.
- Lessingianthus niederleinii (Hieron.) H.Rob.
- Lessingianthus obscurus (Less.) H.Rob.
- Lessingianthus obtusatus (Less.) H.Rob.
- Lessingianthus octanthus (Sch.Bip. ex Baker) H.Rob.
- Lessingianthus onopordioides (Baker) H.Rob.
- Lessingianthus paraguariensis Dematt.
- Lessingianthus parvifolius (Chodat) H.Rob.
- Lessingianthus pentacontus (DC.) H.Rob.
- Lessingianthus petraeus Antar & Loeuille
- Lessingianthus plantaginoides (Less.) H.Rob.
- Lessingianthus platyphyllus (Chodat) H.Rob.
- Lessingianthus polyphyllus (Sch.Bip. ex Baker) H.Rob.
- Lessingianthus pottii (R.Esteves) Loeuille
- Lessingianthus profusus (Dematt. & Cabrera) M.B.Angulo
- Lessingianthus pseudoincanus (Hieron.) Dematt. & Angulo
- Lessingianthus pseudopiptocarphus (H.Rob.) H.Rob.
- Lessingianthus psilophyllus (DC.) H.Rob.
- Lessingianthus pubescens M.B.Angulo & Dematt.
- Lessingianthus pulverulentus (Baker) H.Rob.
- Lessingianthus pusillus (Dematt.) M.B.Angulo
- Lessingianthus pycnostachyus (DC.) H.Rob.
- Lessingianthus ramellae (Cabrera) H.Rob.
- Lessingianthus regis (H.Rob.) H.Rob.
- Lessingianthus reitzianus (Cabrera) H.Rob.
- Lessingianthus rigescens (Malme) Dematt.
- Lessingianthus robustus (Rusby) H.Rob.
- Lessingianthus roseus (Mart. ex DC.) H.Rob.
- Lessingianthus rosmarinifolius (Less.) H.Rob.
- Lessingianthus rubricaulis (Bonpl.) H.Rob.
- Lessingianthus rugulosus (Sch.Bip. ex Baker) H.Rob.
- Lessingianthus saltensis (Hieron.) H.Rob.
- Lessingianthus sancti-pauli (Hieron.) Dematt.
- Lessingianthus scabrifoliatus (Hieron.) H.Rob.
- Lessingianthus scaposus (G.M.Barroso) H.Rob.
- Lessingianthus secundus (Sch.Bip. ex Baker) H.Rob.
- Lessingianthus sellowii (Less.) H.Rob.
- Lessingianthus semirii Antar & Loeuille
- Lessingianthus soderstromii (H.Rob.) H.Rob.
- Lessingianthus souzae (H.Rob.) H.Rob.
- Lessingianthus spicatus (Cabrera) Dematt.
- Lessingianthus spinifolius Neves Ribeiro & A.M.Teles
- Lessingianthus squamosus M.Monge & Semir
- Lessingianthus stoechas (Mart. ex Baker) H.Rob.
- Lessingianthus subcarduoides (H.Rob.) H.Rob.
- Lessingianthus subobscurus (Malme) H.Rob.
- Lessingianthus syncephalus (Sch.Bip. ex Baker) H.Rob.
- Lessingianthus teyucuarensis (Cabrera) Dematt.
- Lessingianthus tomentellus (Mart. ex DC.) H.Rob.
- Lessingianthus ulei (Hieron.) H.Rob.
- Lessingianthus valenzuelae (Chodat) M.B.Angulo
- Lessingianthus varroniifolius (DC.) H.Rob.
- Lessingianthus venosissimus (Sch.Bip. ex Baker) H.Rob.
- Lessingianthus vepretorum (Mart. ex DC.) H.Rob.
- Lessingianthus vestitus (Baker) H.Rob.
- Lessingianthus virgulatus (Mart. ex DC.) H.Rob.
- Lessingianthus warmingianus (Baker) H.Rob.
- Lessingianthus westermanii (Ekman & Dusén) H.Rob.
- Lessingianthus xanthophyllus (Mart. ex DC.) H.Rob.
- Lessingianthus yariguiensis S.Díaz, Rodr.-Cabeza & Aguilar-Cano
- Lessingianthus zuccarinianus (Mart. ex DC.) H.Rob.
