= Maschalostachys =

Scientific classification
- Kingdom: Plantae
- Clade: Tracheophytes
- Clade: Angiosperms
- Clade: Eudicots
- Clade: Asterids
- Order: Asterales
- Family: Asteraceae
- Subfamily: Vernonioideae
- Tribe: Vernonieae
- Subtribe: Lychnophorinae
- Genus: Maschalostachys; Loeuille & Roque

Species
- Maschalostachys markgrafii (G.M.Barroso) Loeuille & Roque; Maschalostachys mellosilvae Loeuille & Roque

Genus of flowering plants

Maschalostachys is a genus of flowering plants in the family Asteraceae. It includes two species endemic to eastern Brazil.

- Maschalostachys markgrafii (G.M.Barroso) Loeuille & Roque
- Maschalostachys mellosilvae Loeuille & Roque
