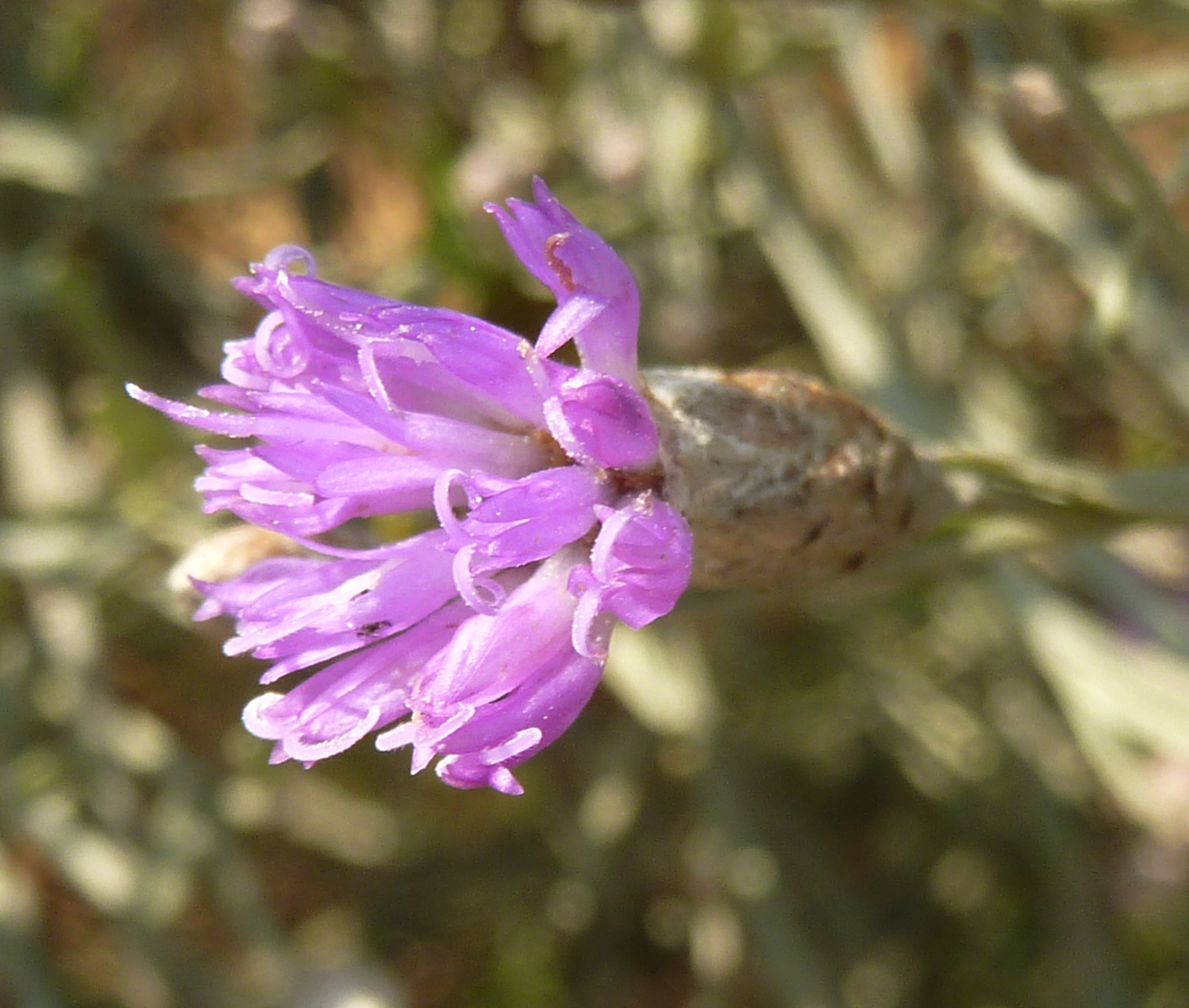

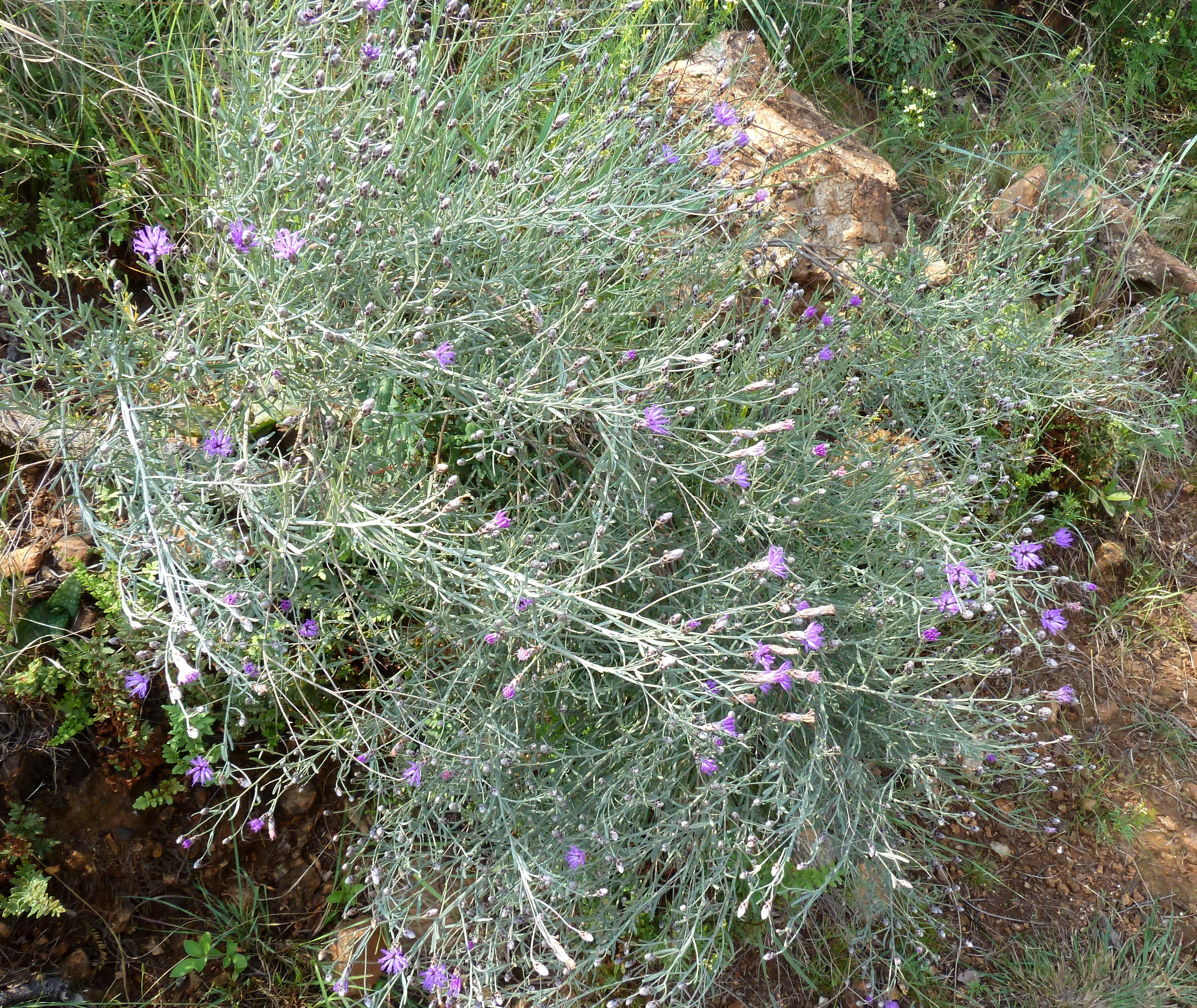
- Polydora poskeana in South Africa

Scientific classification
- Kingdom: Plantae
- Clade: Tracheophytes
- Clade: Angiosperms
- Clade: Eudicots
- Clade: Asterids
- Order: Asterales
- Family: Asteraceae
- Subfamily: Vernonioideae
- Tribe: Vernonieae
- Genus: Polydora; Fenzl

Species
- See text

= Polydora (plant) =

Genus of plants

Polydora is a genus of plants belonging to the family Asteraceae, consisting of some 8 species. The genus is related to Vernonia and is native to Sub-Saharan Africa.

== Species ==
- Polydora angustifolia (Steetz) H.Rob.
- Polydora bainesii (Oliv. & Hiern) H.Rob.
- Polydora chloropappa (Baker) H.Rob.
- Polydora jelfiae (S.Moore) H.Rob.
- Polydora poskeana (Vatke & Hildebr.) H.Rob.
- Polydora serratuloides (DC.) H.Rob.
- Polydora steetziana (Oliv. & Hiern) H.Rob.
- Polydora sylvicola (G.V.Pope) H.Rob.
