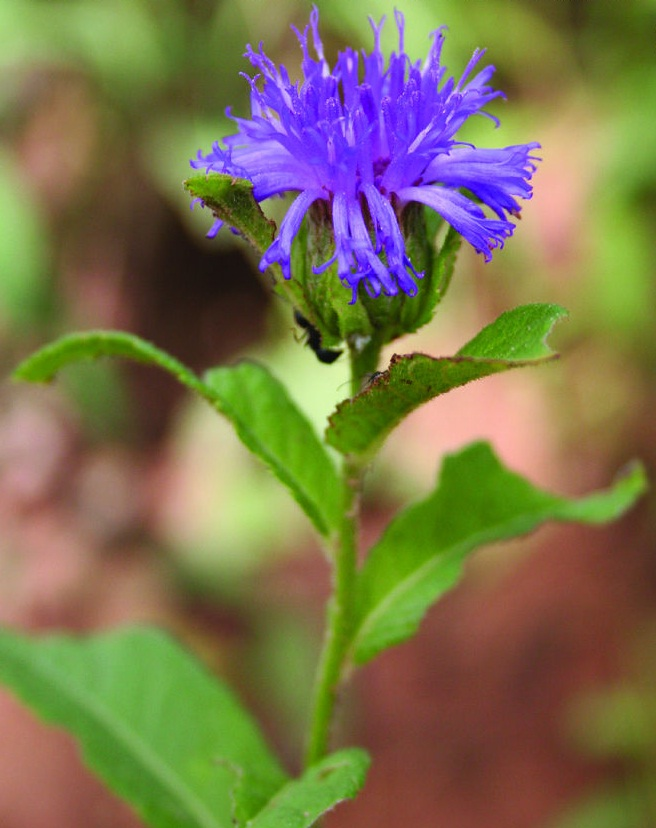
- Nothovernonia purpurea

Scientific classification
- Kingdom: Plantae
- Clade: Tracheophytes
- Clade: Angiosperms
- Clade: Eudicots
- Clade: Asterids
- Order: Asterales
- Family: Asteraceae
- Subfamily: Vernonioideae
- Tribe: Vernonieae
- Genus: Nothovernonia; H.Rob. & V.A.Funk

Species
- Nothovernonia amblyolepis (Baker) H.Rob. & V.A.Funk; Nothovernonia purpurea (Sch.Bip. ex Walp.) H.Rob. & V.A.Funk

= Nothovernonia =

Genus of flowering plants

Nothovernonia is a genus of flowering plants in the family Asteraceae. It includes two species native to tropical Africa and the Arabian Peninsula.

- Nothovernonia amblyolepis (Baker) H.Rob. & V.A.Funk
- Nothovernonia purpurea (Sch.Bip. ex Walp.) H.Rob. & V.A.Funk
