= Neurolakis =

Scientific classification
- Kingdom: Plantae
- Clade: Tracheophytes
- Clade: Angiosperms
- Clade: Eudicots
- Clade: Asterids
- Order: Asterales
- Family: Asteraceae
- Subfamily: Cichorioideae
- Tribe: Vernonieae
- Genus: Neurolakis; Mattf.
- Species: N. modesta

Binomial name
- Neurolakis modesta Mattf.

Genus of flowering plants

Neurolakis is a genus of flowering plants in the tribe Vernonieae within the family Asteraceae.

== Species ==
The only known species is Neurolakis modesta, native to Cameroon in tropical Africa.
