= Khasianthus =

Scientific classification
- Kingdom: Plantae
- Clade: Tracheophytes
- Clade: Angiosperms
- Clade: Eudicots
- Clade: Asterids
- Order: Asterales
- Family: Asteraceae
- Tribe: Vernonieae
- Subtribe: Linziinae
- Genus: Khasianthus
- Species: K. subsessilis

Binomial name
- Khasianthus subsessilis (DC.) H.Rob. & Skvarla

Synonyms
- Cacalia subsessilis (DC.) Kuntze; Vernonia subsessilis DC. (1836) (basionym)

Genus of flowering plants

Khasianthus is a genus of flowering plants in the family Asteraceae. It includes a single species, Khasianthus subsessilis, a subshrub or shrub native to the central and eastern Himalaya, ranging from Nepal to Myanmar and south-central China.
