= Echinocoryne =

Scientific classification
- Kingdom: Plantae
- Clade: Tracheophytes
- Clade: Angiosperms
- Clade: Eudicots
- Clade: Asterids
- Order: Asterales
- Family: Asteraceae
- Subfamily: Cichorioideae
- Tribe: Vernonieae
- Genus: Echinocoryne; H.Rob. (1987)

Species
- 6; see text

Genus of flowering plants

Echinocoryne is a genus of flowering plants in the sunflower family, Asteraceae. It includes six species native to northern, eastern, and central Brazil.

== Species ==
Six species are accepted.

- Echinocoryne echinocephala (H.Rob.) H.Rob.
- Echinocoryne holosericea (Mart. ex DC.) H.Rob.
- Echinocoryne pungens (Gardner) H.Rob.
- Echinocoryne schwenkiifolia (Mart.) H.Rob.
- Echinocoryne stricta (Gardner) H.Rob.
- Echinocoryne subulata (Baker) H.Rob.
