= Spiracantha =

Scientific classification
- Kingdom: Plantae
- Clade: Tracheophytes
- Clade: Angiosperms
- Clade: Eudicots
- Clade: Asterids
- Order: Asterales
- Family: Asteraceae
- Subfamily: Cichorioideae
- Tribe: Vernonieae
- Genus: Spiracantha; Kunth
- Species: S. cornifolia

Binomial name
- Spiracantha cornifolia Kunth

Synonyms
- Acosta DC.; Spiracantha denticulata Ernst; Acosta rolandrae DC.

Genus of plants

Spiracantha is a genus of flowering plants in the tribe Vernonieae within the family Asteraceae.

Species

The only known species is Spiracantha cornifolia, native to Puerto Rico, Hispaniola, Venezuela, Colombia, Central America, and southern Mexico (Veracruz, Tabasco, Yucatán Peninsula).
