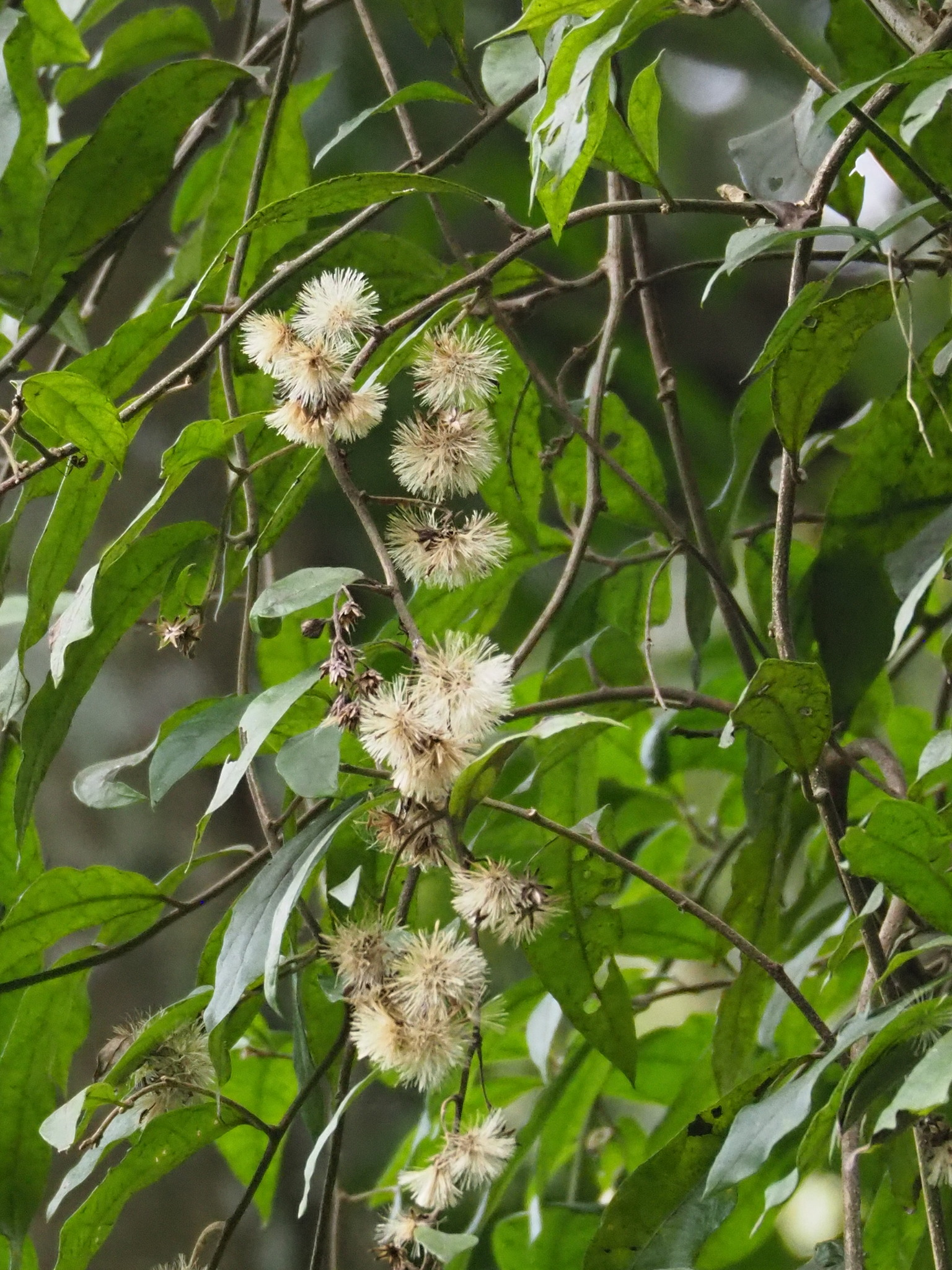
- Decaneuropsis gratiosa

Scientific classification
- Kingdom: Plantae
- Clade: Tracheophytes
- Clade: Angiosperms
- Clade: Eudicots
- Clade: Asterids
- Order: Asterales
- Family: Asteraceae
- Subfamily: Cichorioideae
- Tribe: Vernonieae
- Genus: Decaneuropsis; H.Rob. & Skvarla

Type species
- Vernonia cumingiana Benth.

= Decaneuropsis =

Genus of flowering plants

Decaneuropsis is a genus of plants in the tribe Vernonieae in the family Asteraceae. Species of the genus Decaneuropsis are found in Asia. Some authorities consider the group part of the genus Vernonia.

Species

- Decaneuropsis andamanica (Balakr. & Nair) H.Rob. & Skvarla - Andaman Islands
- Decaneuropsis andersonii (C.B.Clarke) H.Rob. & Skvarla - Thailand
- Decaneuropsis blanda (DC.) H.Rob. & Skvarla - Himalayas, southwestern China, Indochina
- Decaneuropsis chingiana (Hand.-Mazz.) H.Rob. & Skvarla - Guangxi
- Decaneuropsis craibiana (Kerr) H.Rob. & Skvarla - Thailand
- Decaneuropsis cumingiana (Benth.) H.Rob. & Skvarla - southern China, Indochina
- Decaneuropsis eberhardtii (Gagnep.) H.Rob. & Skvarla - Vietnam
- Decaneuropsis garrettiana (Craib) H.Rob. & Skvarla - Thailand
- Decaneuropsis gratiosa (Hance) H.Rob. & Skvarla - Fujian, Taiwan
- Decaneuropsis obovata (Gaudich.) H.Rob. & Skvarla - Timor
- Decaneuropsis philippinensis (Rolfe) H.Rob. & Skvarla - Philippines
- Decaneuropsis vagans (DC.) H.Rob. & Skvarla - Myanmar, Assam
