= Prestelia =

Scientific classification
- Kingdom: Plantae
- Clade: Tracheophytes
- Clade: Angiosperms
- Clade: Eudicots
- Clade: Asterids
- Order: Asterales
- Family: Asteraceae
- Subfamily: Cichorioideae
- Tribe: Vernonieae
- Genus: Prestelia; Sch.Bip. ex Benth. & Hook.f.

Synonyms
- Eriopus Sch.Bip. ex Baker

Genus of flowering plants

Prestelia is a genus of flowering plants belonging to the family Asteraceae.

It is native to south eastern Brasil.

== Description ==
It is a perennial or acaulous (having no stem) sub-shrubs with broad rootstock. It has lanulose (fine, wooly hairs), the hairs are stellate-based. It has linear leaves. It has 1 to many inflorescences, which are pedunculate (have flower stalks) and compound heads. The secondard involucre (bract around the flower) is made of about 5 subequal bracts. The individual heads are 5-10 in a cluster, sessile (without a stalk). The involucral bracts about 12 in about 2 series. It has 5-6 florets. The anthers are not tailed and the sweeping hairs are acute. Achenes (dry fruits) are about 8 costate, scattered setulae, glands and idioblasts. It has pappus bristles in 2-3 series, no squamellae.

== Taxonomy ==
The genus name of Prestelia is in honour of Michael August Friedrich Prestel (1809–1880), a German mathematician, meteorologist and cartographer. He was also professor of mathematics and natural science at a school in Emden, and director of the naturalist society in Emden. It was first described and published in Gen. Pl. Vol.2 on page 236 in 1873. The genus is recognized by the United States Department of Agriculture and the Agricultural Research Service, but they do not list any known species.

== Known species ==
According to Kew;

- Prestelia eriopus Sch.Bip.
- Prestelia espeletoidea Loeuille, Semir & Pirani
- Prestelia purpurascens (Glaz. ex Oliv.) Loeuille, Semir & Pirani

Prestelia eriopus Sch. Bip. is used in Brazil as a medicinal plant.
