= Harleya =

Scientific classification
- Kingdom: Plantae
- Clade: Tracheophytes
- Clade: Angiosperms
- Clade: Eudicots
- Clade: Asterids
- Order: Asterales
- Family: Asteraceae
- Subfamily: Cichorioideae
- Tribe: Vernonieae
- Genus: Harleya; S.F.Blake
- Species: H. oxylepis

Binomial name
- Harleya oxylepis (Benth.) S.F.Blake

Synonyms
- Oliganthes oxylepis Benth.

Genus of flowering plants

Harleya is a genus of Mesoamerican flowering plants in the family Asteraceae.

The genus is named for Prof. Harley Harris Bartlett, 1886–1960.

Species

There is only one known species, Harleya oxylepis, native to Belize, Tabasco, and the Yucatán Peninsula.
