= Stramentopappus =

Scientific classification
- Kingdom: Plantae
- Clade: Tracheophytes
- Clade: Angiosperms
- Clade: Eudicots
- Clade: Asterids
- Order: Asterales
- Family: Asteraceae
- Subfamily: Cichorioideae
- Tribe: Vernonieae
- Genus: Stramentopappus; H.Rob. & V.A.Funk

Type species
- Stramentopappus pooleae (B.L.Turner) H.Rob. & V.A.Funk

Genus of plants

Stramentopappus is a genus of Mexican plants in the tribe Vernonieae within the family Asteraceae.

Species

- Stramentopappus congestiflorus Redonda-Martínez & Villaseñor - State of Oaxaca in southern Mexico
- Stramentopappus pooleae (B.L.Turner) H.Rob. & V.A.Funk - State of Oaxaca in southern Mexico
