= Hystrichophora macrophylla =

Scientific classification
- Kingdom: Plantae
- Clade: Embryophytes
- Clade: Tracheophytes
- Clade: Angiosperms
- Clade: Eudicots
- Clade: Asterids
- Order: Asterales
- Family: Asteraceae
- Subfamily: Vernonioideae
- Tribe: Vernonieae
- Genus: Hystrichophora; Mattf.
- Species: H. macrophylla

Binomial name
- Hystrichophora macrophylla Mattf.

Genus of flowering plants

Hystrichophora is a genus of East African flowering plants in the family Asteraceae.

Species

There is only one known species, Hystrichophora macrophylla, native to Tanzania.
