= Okia (plant) =

Scientific classification
- Kingdom: Plantae
- Clade: Tracheophytes
- Clade: Angiosperms
- Clade: Eudicots
- Clade: Asterids
- Order: Asterales
- Family: Asteraceae
- Subfamily: Cichorioideae
- Tribe: Vernonieae
- Genus: Okia; H.Rob. & Skvarla

Genus of plants

Okia is a genus of flowering plants belonging to the family Asteraceae.

Its native range is Indo-China.

Species:

- Okia birmanica (Kuntze) H.Rob. & Skvarla
- Okia pseudobirmanica (H.Koyama) Bunwong, Chantar. & S.C.Keeley
