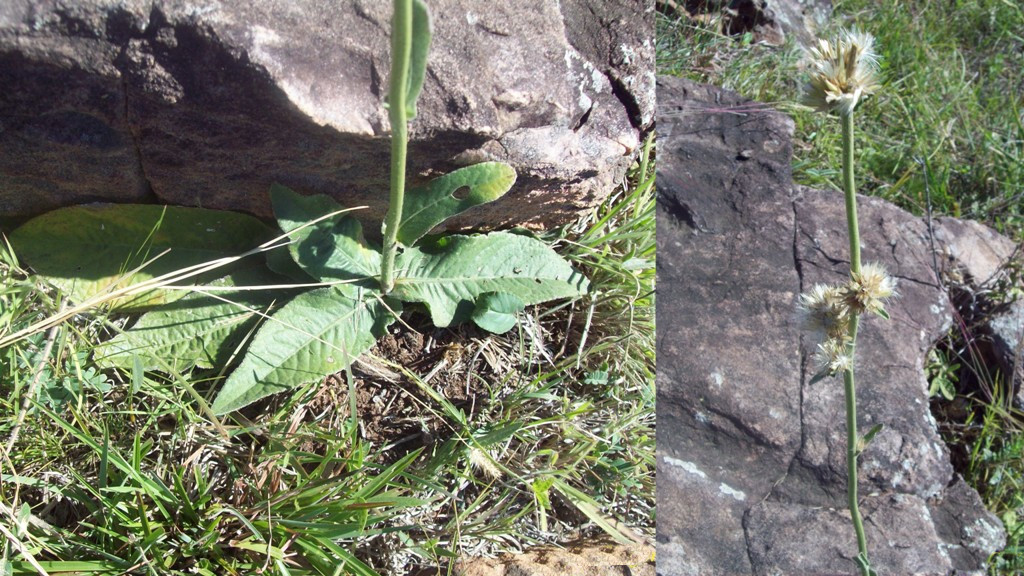

Scientific classification
- Kingdom: Plantae
- Clade: Tracheophytes
- Clade: Angiosperms
- Clade: Eudicots
- Clade: Asterids
- Order: Asterales
- Family: Asteraceae
- Genus: Orthopappus; Gleason
- Species: O. angustifolius

Binomial name
- Orthopappus angustifolius (Sw.) Gleason

Synonyms
- Synonymy: Distreptus angustifolius (Sw.) Cass.; Distreptus crispus Cass.; Distreptus nudiflorus (Willd.) Less.; Elephantopus angustifolius Sw. (1788) (basionym); Elephantosis angustifolia (Sw.) DC.; Elephantopus crispus D.Dietr.; Elephantopus liatroides Steud.; Elephantopus nudiflorus Willd.; Elephantopus quadriflora (Less.) D.Dietr.; Elephantosis liatroides Fisch. & C.A.Mey.; Elephantosis quadrifolia Less.; Pseudelephantopus crispus Cabrera

= Orthopappus =

Genus of flowering plants

Orthopappus is a genus of flowering plants in the family Asteraceae. It includes a single species, Orthopappus angustifolius, a perennial plant native to the tropical Americas, ranging from northeastern Mexico to northern Argentina.
