= Ananthura pteropoda =

Scientific classification
- Kingdom: Plantae
- Clade: Tracheophytes
- Clade: Angiosperms
- Clade: Eudicots
- Clade: Asterids
- Order: Asterales
- Family: Asteraceae
- Subfamily: Cichorioideae
- Tribe: Vernonieae
- Genus: Ananthura; H.Rob. & Skvarla
- Species: A. pteropoda

Binomial name
- Ananthura pteropoda (Oliv. & Hiern) H.Rob. & Skvarla

Synonyms
- Vernonia pteropoda Oliv. & Hiern; Cacalia pteropoda Kuntze; Vernonia urophylla Muschl.

Genus of flowering plants

Ananthura is a genus of flowering plants belonging to the family Asteraceae. The only species is Ananthura pteropoda.

Its native range is Kenya to Southern Tropical Africa.
