= L. spinosa =

L. spinosa may refer to:

- Lacurbs spinosa, a harvestman species in the genus Lacurbs and the family Biantidae
- Lepidotrigla spinosa, a sea robin species in the genus Lepidotrigla
- Licuala spinosa, a palm species
- Lonicera spinosa, a honeysuckle species in the genus Lonicera
- Lupettiana spinosa, a spider species in the genus Lupettiana
- Lygodesmia spinosa, a wirelettuce species now known as Pleiacanthus spinosus
- Lysiosquilla spinosa, a mantis shrimp species

== See also ==
- Spinosa (disambiguation)
