= Moquinia =

Scientific classification
- Kingdom: Plantae
- Clade: Tracheophytes
- Clade: Angiosperms
- Clade: Eudicots
- Clade: Asterids
- Order: Asterales
- Family: Asteraceae
- Subfamily: Vernonioideae
- Tribe: Moquinieae
- Genus: Moquinia; DC. 1838, conserved name, not A.Spreng. 1828 (syn of Moquiniella in Loranthaceae)

Type species
- Moquinia racemosa (Spreng.) DC.

Synonyms
- Spadonia Less.

Genus of flowering plants

Moquinia is a genus of flowering plants in the tribe Moquinieae within the family Asteraceae.

The genus name of Moquinia is in honour of Alfred Moquin-Tandon (1804–1863), a French naturalist and doctor. It was first described and published in 1838.

Species

Over 40 species names have been described in the genus, but nearly all of them have been transferred to other genera (Barrosoa, Gochnatia, Guayania, Inula, Llerasia, Piptocarpha, and Pseudostifftia). Two remain in Moquinia.

- Moquinia bojeri DC. – Tanzania
- Moquinia racemosa (Spreng.) DC. – Minas Gerais, Bahia (states in Brazil)

As of May 2024, Plants of the World Online listed Moquinia bojeri as "unplaced".
