= Stephanomeria fluminea =

Scientific classification
- Kingdom: Plantae
- Clade: Tracheophytes
- Clade: Angiosperms
- Clade: Eudicots
- Clade: Asterids
- Order: Asterales
- Family: Asteraceae
- Genus: Stephanomeria
- Species: S. fluminea

Binomial name
- Stephanomeria fluminea (Gottlieb)

Species of plant

Stephanomeria fluminea is a species of flowering plant in the family Asteraceae known by the common names Creekside wirelettuce or Teton wirelettuce.
