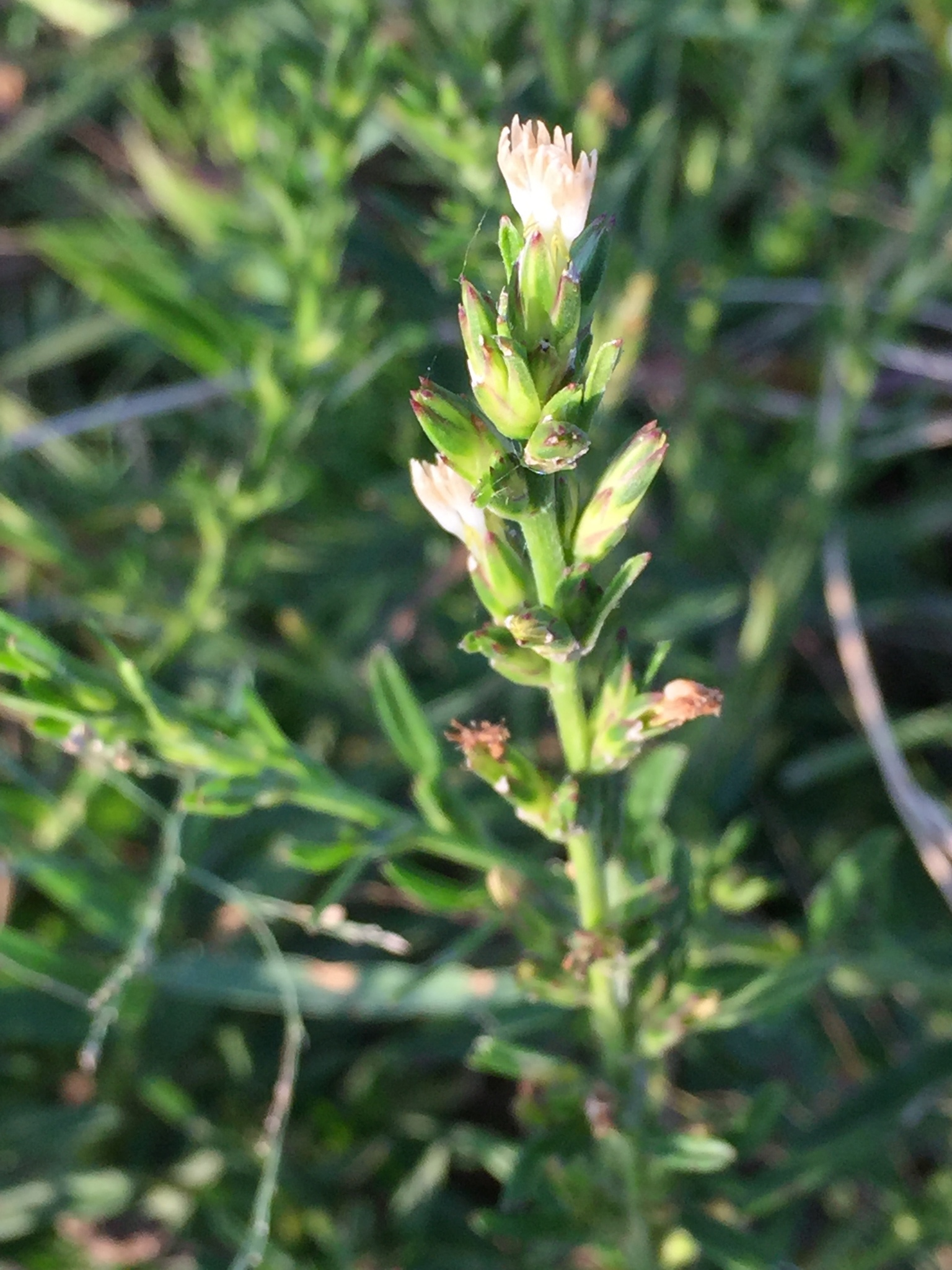

Scientific classification
- Kingdom: Plantae
- Clade: Tracheophytes
- Clade: Angiosperms
- Clade: Eudicots
- Clade: Asterids
- Order: Asterales
- Family: Asteraceae
- Subfamily: Cichorioideae
- Tribe: Vernonieae
- Genus: Pseudelephantopus; Rohr

Synonyms
- Chaetospira S.F.Blake; Distreptus Cass.; Matamoria La Llave & Lex.; Spirochaeta Turcz. 1851 not Ehrenberg 1835 (a bacterium)

= Pseudelephantopus =

Genus of plants

Pseudelephantopus is a genus of flowering plants in the family Asteraceae described as a genus in 1792.

== Species ==
Species accepted by the Plants of the World Online as of March 2023:

- Pseudelephantopus spicatus (Juss. ex Aubl.) C.F.Baker
- Pseudelephantopus spiralis (Less.) Cronquist
