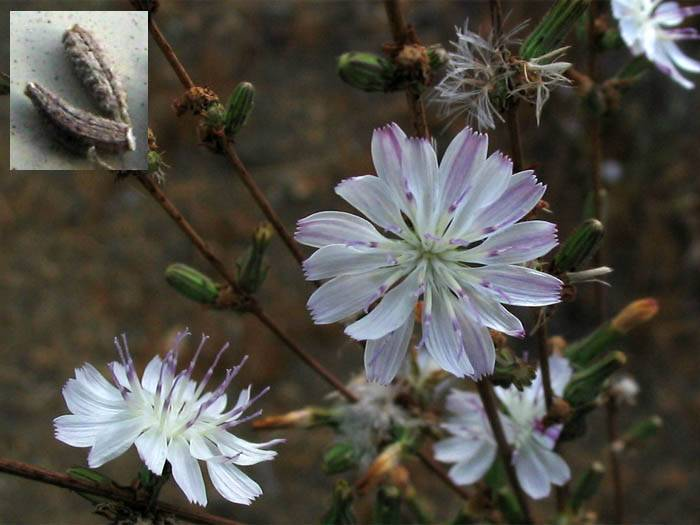

Conservation status
- Imperiled (NatureServe)

Scientific classification
- Kingdom: Plantae
- Clade: Tracheophytes
- Clade: Angiosperms
- Clade: Eudicots
- Clade: Asterids
- Order: Asterales
- Family: Asteraceae
- Genus: Stephanomeria
- Species: S. diegensis

Binomial name
- Stephanomeria diegensis Gottlieb

= Stephanomeria diegensis =

Species of plant

Stephanomeria diegensis is a species of flowering plant in the family Asteraceae known by the common name San Diego wirelettuce. It is native to the coastal hills and ranges of southern California and Baja California, where it grows in many types of open habitat. It evolved as a hybrid of Stephanomeria exigua and S. virgata. Furthermore, it is thought to be the result of homoploid hybrid speciation, which is uncommon. The plant is frequently misidentified as one of its parents, especially if older taxonomic keys are used. This is an erect annual herb easily exceeding two meters in height. Its slender stem has many spreading branches. The basal leaves are linear to lance-shaped and up to 10 centimeters long. The leaves wither early and are absent for most of the year, giving the plant a twiglike appearance. Leaves on the upper stem are small and reduced. The inflorescences are usually clusters of flower heads located at intervals on the stiff branches. Each head has a cylindrical base lined with phyllaries. These are often glandular. The head contains several ray florets, each with an elongated tube and a white or pink-tinged ligule measuring around a centimeter long. The fruit is a grooved achene tipped with a spreading cluster of long, plumelike pappus bristles.
