= S. paniculata =

S. paniculata may refer to:

- Saxifraga paniculata, a species of plant in the family Saxifragaceae
- Stephanomeria paniculata, a species of plant in the aster/daisy/sunflower family, Asteraceae
- Symmeria paniculata, a species of plant in the knotweed family, Polygonaceae
- Stirlingia paniculata, a synonym for Stirlingia latifolia which is a species of plant in the family Proteaceae
