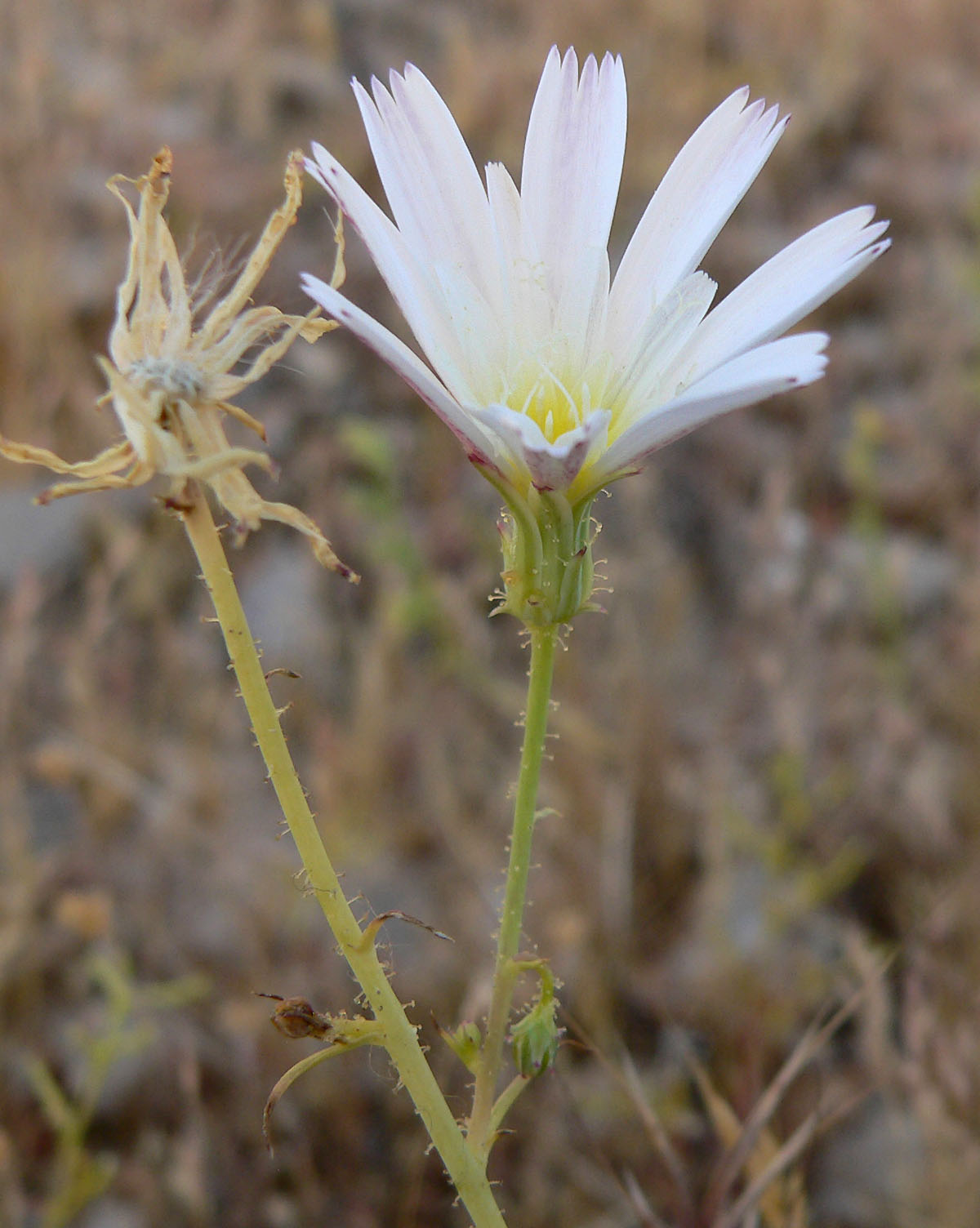
- Calycoseris wrightii

Scientific classification
- Kingdom: Plantae
- Clade: Tracheophytes
- Clade: Angiosperms
- Clade: Eudicots
- Clade: Asterids
- Order: Asterales
- Family: Asteraceae
- Subfamily: Cichorioideae
- Tribe: Cichorieae
- Subtribe: Microseridinae
- Genus: Calycoseris; A.Gray

Type species
- Calycoseris wrightii A.Gray

Species
- 2: see text

= Calycoseris =

Genus of flowering plants

Calycoseris is a small genus of two species of annual desert wildflowers in the family Asteraceae, native to western North America in the southwestern United States and Northwestern Mexico. They are characterized by the tack-shaped gland hairs on their upper stems and bracts, the trait which gives them the common name tackstem. The two species of tackstem are the yellow tackstem, Calycoseris parryi and the white tackstem, Calycoseris wrightii.

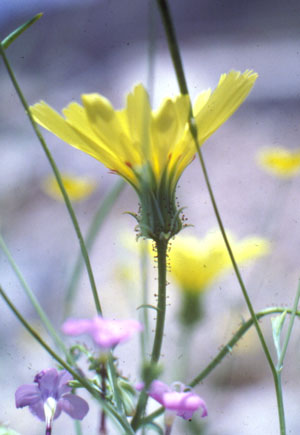
Yellow tackstem
