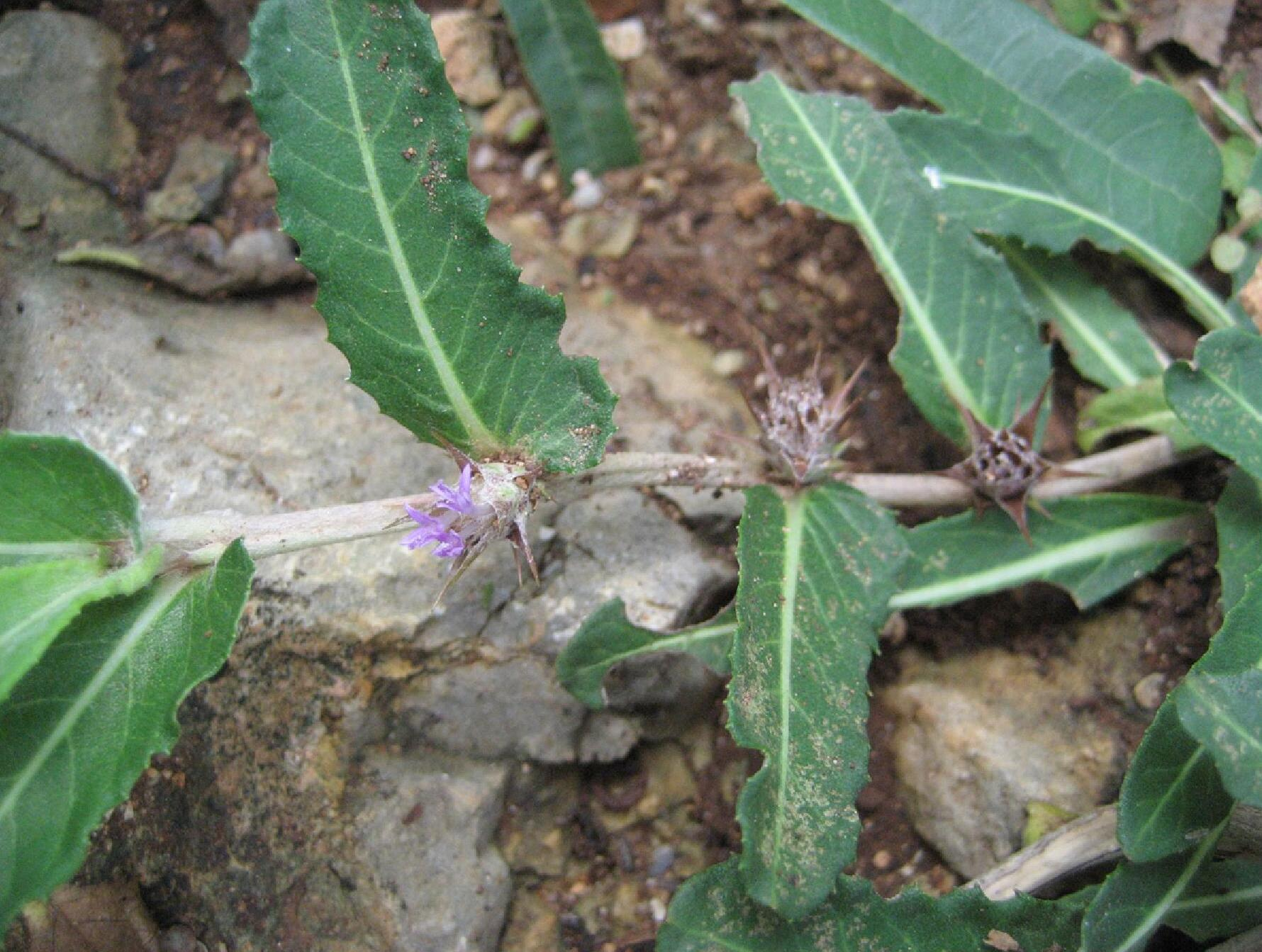
- Acanthodesmos gibarensis

Scientific classification
- Kingdom: Plantae
- Clade: Tracheophytes
- Clade: Angiosperms
- Clade: Eudicots
- Clade: Asterids
- Order: Asterales
- Family: Asteraceae
- Subfamily: Cichorioideae
- Tribe: Vernonieae
- Genus: Acanthodesmos; C.D.Adams & duQuesnay

= Acanthodesmos =

Genus of flowering plants

Acanthodesmos is a genus of the family Asteraceae described in 1971. As of May 2023, Plants of the World Online accepted two species:

- Acanthodesmos distichus C.D.Adams & duQuesnay
- Acanthodesmos gibarensis P.Herrera & P.A.González
