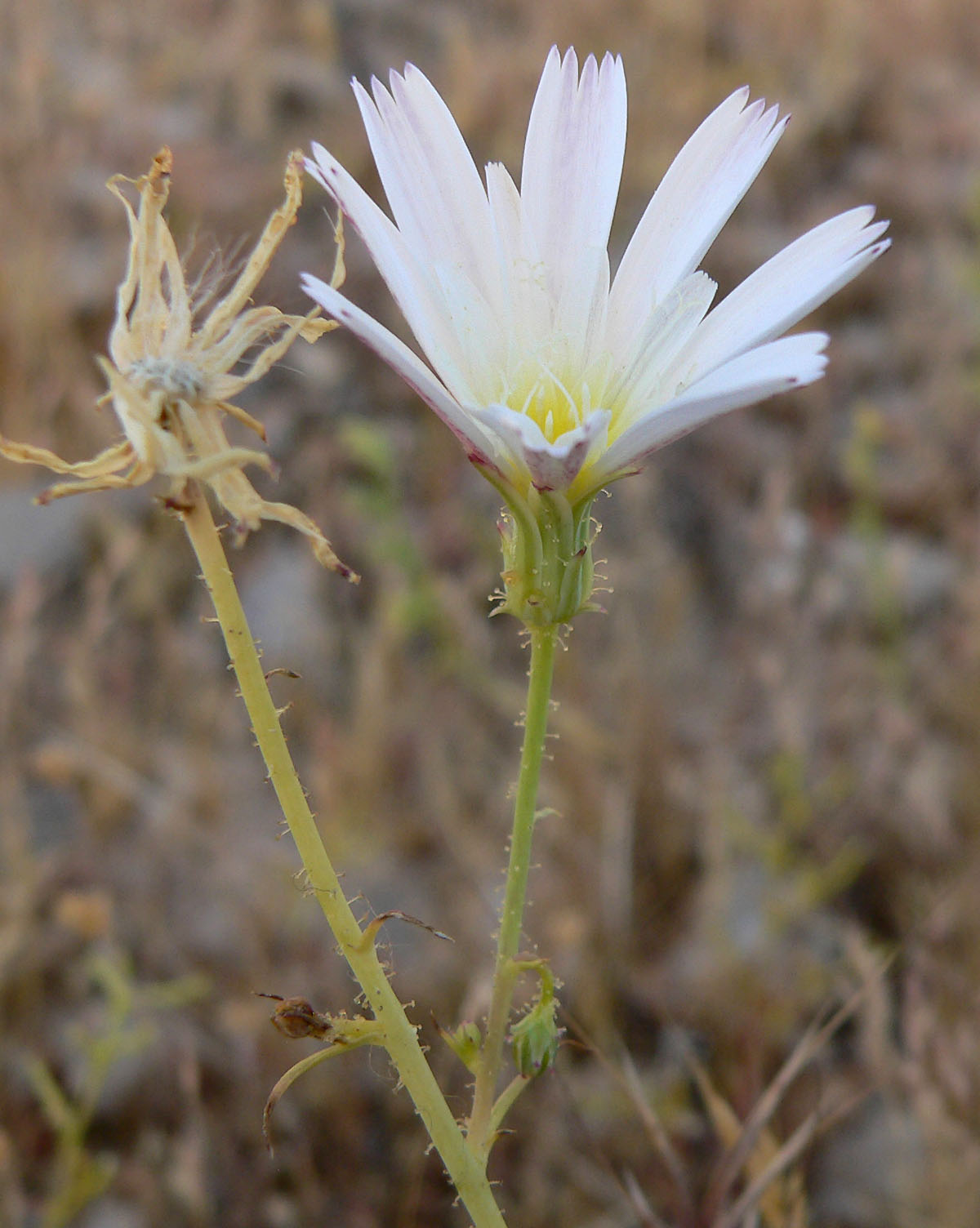

Conservation status
- Apparently Secure (NatureServe)

Scientific classification
- Kingdom: Plantae
- Clade: Tracheophytes
- Clade: Angiosperms
- Clade: Eudicots
- Clade: Asterids
- Order: Asterales
- Family: Asteraceae
- Genus: Calycoseris
- Species: C. wrightii

Binomial name
- Calycoseris wrightii A.Gray

= Calycoseris wrightii =

Species of flowering plant

Calycoseris wrightii, commonly known as white tackstem, is an annual spring wildflower, one of two species in the genus Calycoseris; the other species is C. parryi, the yellow tackstem. They are part of the family Asteraceae.

White tackstem is found in the southwestern United States and northwestern Mexico in California, Nevada, southwestern Utah (Washington County), New Mexico, Arizona, northern Baja California, Sonora, western Texas (El Paso County).

Calycoseris wrightii is a white daisy-like flower up to more than 2.0 inches (5 cm) across; when it grows supported amongst other plants it can be more than 45 cm (18 in) tall. It has one easy distinguishing feature: the closed outside of the ray florets contain two linear purple stripes (fine reddish veins abaxially – 2 to 3 cm (1 in)). It is a spring wildflower found in the desert regions and is plentiful after winter rains. It grows up to 4,000 feet (1,220 m) elevation.
