= Lipschitzia =

Scientific classification
- Kingdom: Plantae
- Clade: Tracheophytes
- Clade: Angiosperms
- Clade: Eudicots
- Clade: Asterids
- Order: Asterales
- Family: Asteraceae
- Subfamily: Cichorioideae
- Tribe: Cichorieae
- Subtribe: Scorzonerinae
- Genus: Lipschitzia
- Species: L. divaricata

Binomial name
- Lipschitzia divaricata (Turcz.) Zaika, Sukhor. & N.Kilian

Synonyms
- Scorzonera divaricata Turcz. (1832) (basionym); Scorzonera divaricata var. intricatissima Maxim.; Scorzonera divaricata var. sublilacina Maxim.; Scorzonera divaricata var. tatewakii Kitam.; Scorzonera roylei DC.

Genus of flowering plants

Lipschitzia is a genus of flowering plants in the family Asteraceae. It includes a single species, Lipschitzia divaricata, a perennial or subshrub native to Mongolia, Inner Mongolia, north-central China, and the western Himalayas.
