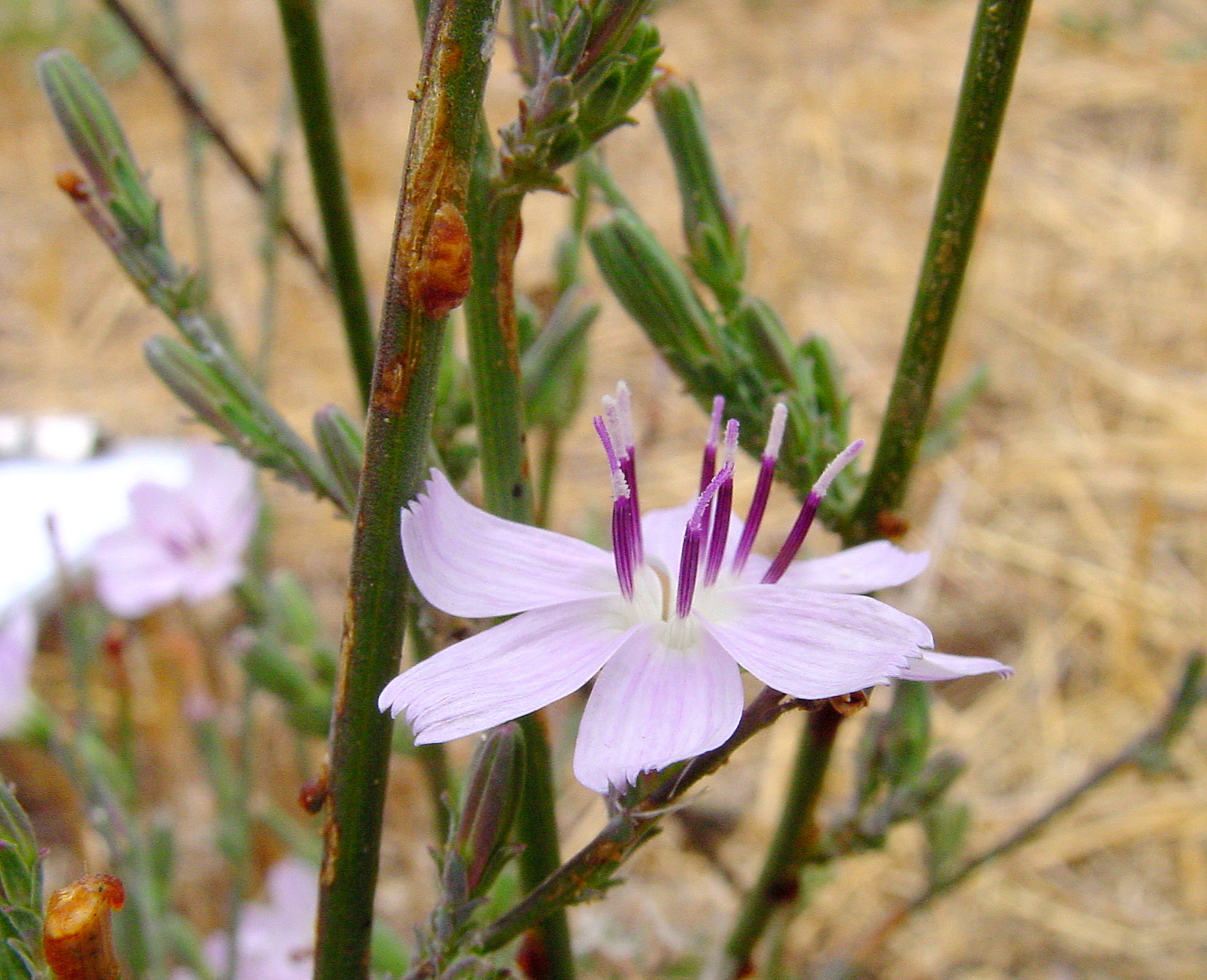
- Stephanomeria virgata

Scientific classification
- Kingdom: Plantae
- Clade: Tracheophytes
- Clade: Angiosperms
- Clade: Eudicots
- Clade: Asterids
- Order: Asterales
- Family: Asteraceae
- Subfamily: Cichorioideae
- Tribe: Cichorieae
- Subtribe: Microseridinae
- Genus: Stephanomeria; Nutt.

Type species
- Stephanomeria minor (syn of S. tenuifolia) (Hook.) Nutt.

Synonyms
- Hemiptilium A.Gray; Ptiloria Raf.

= Stephanomeria =

Genus of plants

Stephanomeria is a genus of North American plants also known as wirelettuce, belonging to the tribe Cichorieae within the family Asteraceae.

Stephanomeria species are used as food plants by the larvae of some Lepidoptera species including Schinia scarletina, which feeds exclusively on the genus.

Annual species

- Stephanomeria diegensis Gottlieb - San Diego wirelettuce - Baja California, southern California; Hybrid origin: S. exigua х S. virgata
- Stephanomeria elata Nutt. - Santa Barbara wirelettuce - California and Oregon; 2n=32
- Stephanomeria exigua Nutt. - small wirelettuce - widespread throughout western United States + Baja California; 2n=16
- Stephanomeria hitchcockii Gand. - Kansas
- Stephanomeria malheurensis Gottlieb - Malheur wirelettuce - Harney County in Oregon; 2n=16
- Stephanomeria mexiae M.E.Jones - Chihuahua
- Stephanomeria paniculata Nutt. - tufted wirelettuce - Washington, Oregon, California, Nevada, Idaho; 2n=16
- Stephanomeria virgata Benth. - rod wirelettuce - California, Oregon, Nevada, Baja California; 2n=16

Perennial species

- Stephanomeria cichoriacea A.Gray - chicoryleaf wirelettuce - southern California; 2n=16
- Stephanomeria fluminea Gottlieb - Teton wirelettuce - Endemic to northwestern Wyoming; 2n=16
- Stephanomeria guadalupensis Brandegee - Endemic to Guadalupe Island in Baja California; 2n=16
- Stephanomeria lactucina A.Gray - woodland wirelettuce - California, Oregon and Nevada; 2n=16
- Stephanomeria monocephala Moran - Baja California
- Stephanomeria occultata Wellard & J.W.Baker - Endemic to Weber River corridor, Northern Utah; 2n=16
- Stephanomeria parryi A.Gray - Parry's wirelettuce - Arizona, California, Nevada, Utah; 2n=32
- Stephanomeria pauciflora (Torr.) A.Nelson - Brownplume wirelettuce - widespread, southwestern United States; Mexico (Baja California, Sonora, Coahuila); 2n=16
- Stephanomeria runcinata Nutt. - desert wirelettuce - Colorado, Montana, Nebraska, Utah, Wyoming, North Dakota, Alberta, Saskatchewan; 2n=16
- Stephanomeria tenuifolia (Raf.) H.M.Hall - narrow-leaved wirelettuce - western United States; Saskatchewan, British Columbia, Baja California; 2n=16
- Stephanomeria thurberi A.Gray - Thurber's wirelettuce - New Mexico, Arizona, Sonora, Texas; 2n=16

formerly included

see Chaetadelpha Microseris Munzothamnus Pleiacanthus Prenanthella

- Stephanomeria blairii - Munzothamnus blairii
- Stephanomeria intermedia - Microseris nutans
- Stephanomeria minima - Prenanthella exigua
- Stephanomeria spinosa - Pleiacanthus spinosus
- Stephanomeria wheeleri - Chaetadelpha wheeleri
