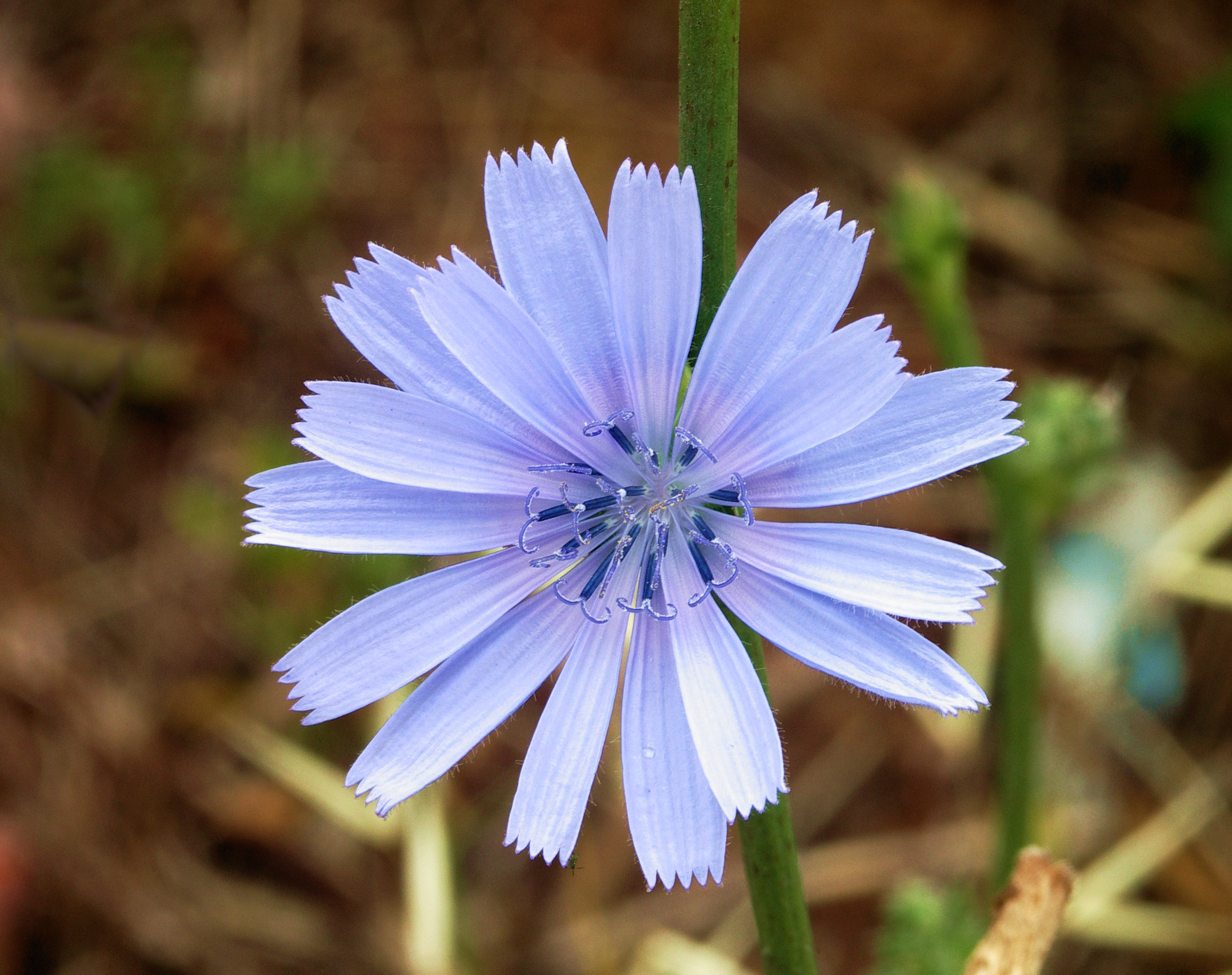
- Cichorium intybus

Scientific classification
- Kingdom: Plantae
- Clade: Embryophytes
- Clade: Tracheophytes
- Clade: Spermatophytes
- Clade: Angiosperms
- Clade: Eudicots
- Clade: Asterids
- Order: Asterales
- Family: Asteraceae
- Subfamily: Cichorioideae; Chevallier

Tribes
- See text

= Cichorioideae =

Subfamily of plants

The Cichorioideae are a subfamily of the family Asteraceae of flowering plants. Familiar members of Cichorioideae include lettuce, dandelions, chicory and Gazania species. The subfamily comprises about 240 genera and about 2900 species. It is heterogeneous and hard to characterize except with molecular characters.

== Taxonomy ==
The subfamily as understood in 1998 turned out to be paraphyletic, based on studies of DNA sequences, so a number of tribes were moved to new subfamilies. Names for the new subfamilies were published in 2002. In 2004, 2007, and 2008, molecular phylogenetic studies further clarified relationships within Cichorioideae.

Major works on Asteraceae were published in 2007 and 2009. These were the only comprehensive treatments of the family since 1994. In the 2007 book, Gundelia and Warionia were segregated from the tribe Cichorieae to form the tribe Gundelieae. Eremothamnus, Hoplophyllum, Heterolepis, and Platycarpha were placed incertae sedis in tribe Arctotideae, while Distephanus, Trichospira, Moquinia, and Pseudostifftia were placed in the tribe Vernonieae. Some of this classification was not supported by phylogenetic studies that came out later. For example, the tribe Arctotideae was only weakly supported as monophyletic, but its two subtribes, Arctotidinae and Gorteriinae, were strongly supported.

In the 2009 book, the Gundelieae were sunk into the Cichorieae. The new tribe Platycarpheae was recognized, as well as the tribes Eremothamneae and Moquinieae. Heterolepis was placed in the Arctotideae, at least provisionally. Distephanus was not placed in the Moquinieae or the Vernonieae, but is closely related to them. Trichospira was placed in the Vernonieae, but its inclusion there is in doubt.

== Phylogeny ==
The following phylogeny is from Systematics, Evolution and Biogeography of the Compositae, except the tribe Gundelieae is recognized and the genus Trichospira is now included in Vernonieae.

- Cichorioideae
  - - Gundelieae
    - Cichorieae
  - - Eremothamneae
    - Arctotidinae
    - Heterolepis
    - Gorteriinae
    - Platycarpheae
    - - Liabeae
      - - Distephanus
        - Trichospira
        - Moquinieae
        - Vernonieae
