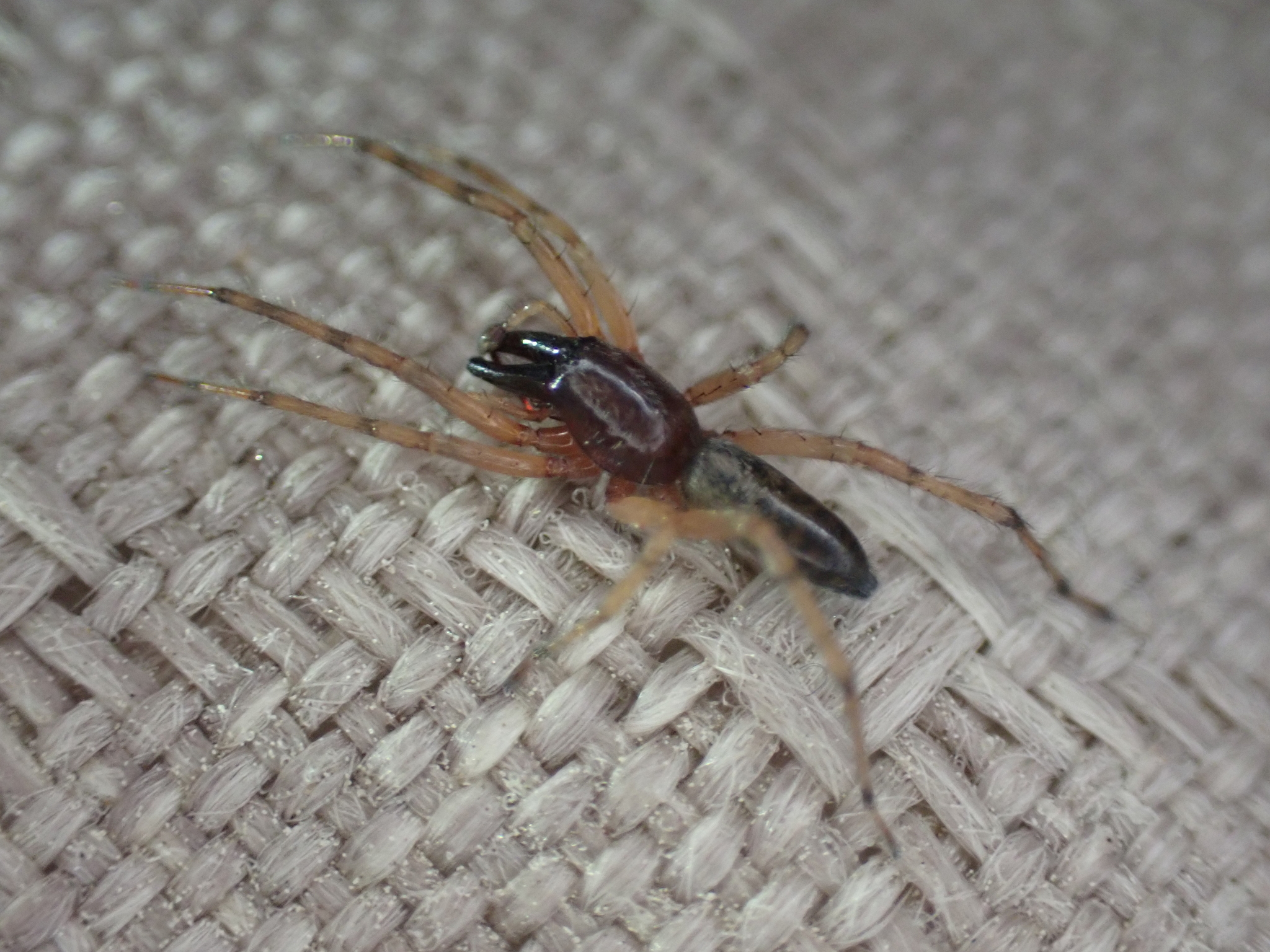

Scientific classification
- Domain: Eukaryota
- Kingdom: Animalia
- Phylum: Arthropoda
- Subphylum: Chelicerata
- Class: Arachnida
- Order: Araneae
- Infraorder: Araneomorphae
- Family: Anyphaenidae
- Genus: Lupettiana
- Species: L. mordax

Binomial name
- Lupettiana mordax (O. P.-Cambridge, 1896)

= Lupettiana mordax =

Species of spider

Lupettiana mordax is a species of ghost spider in the family Anyphaenidae. It is found in a range from the United States to Peru and Brazil.
