= Acanthodesmos distichus =

Scientific classification
- Kingdom: Plantae
- Clade: Embryophytes
- Clade: Tracheophytes
- Clade: Spermatophytes
- Clade: Angiosperms
- Clade: Eudicots
- Clade: Asterids
- Order: Asterales
- Family: Asteraceae
- Genus: Acanthodesmos
- Species: A. distichus

Binomial name
- Acanthodesmos distichus C.D.Adams & duQuesnay

Species of plant

Acanthodesmos distichus is a species of flowering plant in the family Asteraceae, native to Jamaica. It was first described in 1971.
