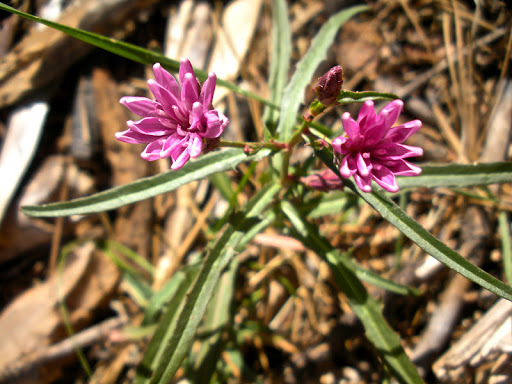

Scientific classification
- Kingdom: Plantae
- Clade: Tracheophytes
- Clade: Angiosperms
- Clade: Eudicots
- Clade: Asterids
- Order: Asterales
- Family: Asteraceae
- Genus: Stephanomeria
- Species: S. lactucina

Binomial name
- Stephanomeria lactucina A.Gray

= Stephanomeria lactucina =

Species of flowering plant

Stephanomeria lactucina is a species of flowering plant in the family Asteraceae known by the common names lettuce wirelettuce and woodland wirelettuce. It is native to Oregon and California, where it grows in coastal and inland mountain ranges, including the Sierra Nevada. It can be found in many types of habitat, including coniferous forests. It is rhizomatous perennial herb producing a slender, erect stem reaching 30 to 60 centimeters in maximum height. The linear or lance-shaped leaves are up to 8 centimeters long and their edges are lined with widely spaced teeth. Solitary flower heads occur on erect peduncles. Each head contains up to 10 ray florets, each with an elongated tube and a fringed pink ligule roughly a centimeter long. The fruit is an achene tipped with a spreading cluster of long, plumelike pappus bristles.
