= Schinia scarletina =

Scientific classification
- Domain: Eukaryota
- Kingdom: Animalia
- Phylum: Arthropoda
- Class: Insecta
- Order: Lepidoptera
- Superfamily: Noctuoidea
- Family: Noctuidae
- Genus: Schinia
- Species: S. scarletina

Binomial name
- Schinia scarletina Smith, 1900

Species of moth

Schinia scarletina is a moth of the family Noctuidae. It is found in North America, including Arizona, Kansas, New Mexico, Utah, California, south to Baja California.

The wingspan is about 20 mm.

Larvae have been recorded on Stephanomeria.
