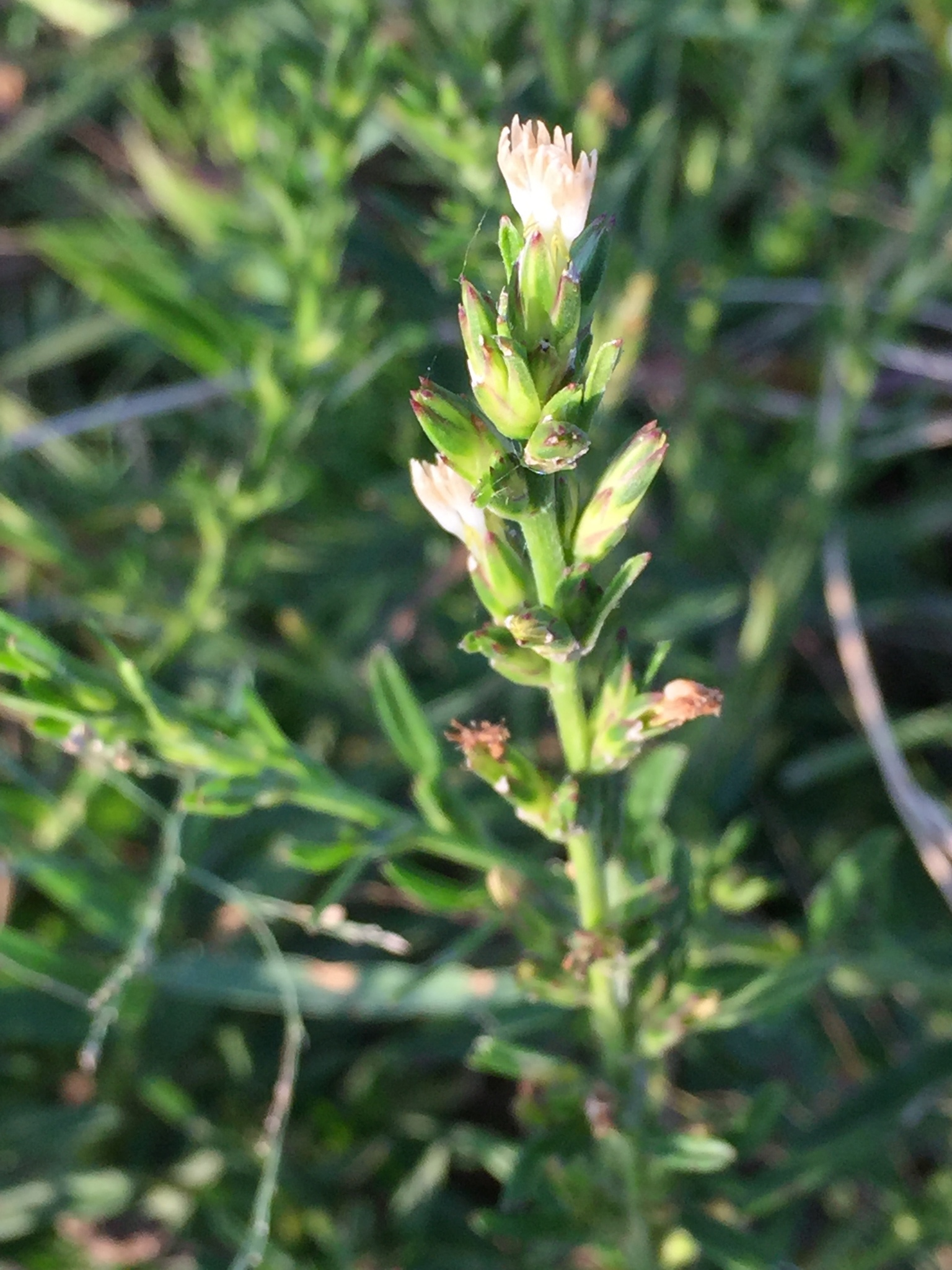

Scientific classification
- Kingdom: Plantae
- Clade: Tracheophytes
- Clade: Angiosperms
- Clade: Eudicots
- Clade: Asterids
- Order: Asterales
- Family: Asteraceae
- Genus: Pseudelephantopus
- Species: P. spicatus

Binomial name
- Pseudelephantopus spicatus Rohr ex Gleason

Synonyms
- List: Ageratum dubium Blanco; Ageratum quadriflorum Blanco; Distreptus crispus Cass.; Distreptus nudiflorus (Willd.) Less.; Distreptus spicatus (Juss. ex Aubl.) Cass.; Elephantopus crispus Sch. Bip.; Elephantopus glaber Sessé & Moc.; Elephantopus nudiflorus Willd.; Elephantopus spicatus Juss. ex Aubl.; Matamoria spicata La Llave; Pseudelephantopus crispus Cabrera; Pseudoelephantopus spicatus (Juss. ex Aubl.) Rohr ex Gleason

= Pseudelephantopus spicatus =

Species of plant

Pseudelephantopus spicatus, commonly known as dog's-tongue or false elephant's foot. It is native to tropical areas in Mesoamerica, South America, and the West Indies and is naturalized in Florida, mostly on sandy soils. It has also been introduced to Africa, Southeast Asia, and some islands in the Pacific.

Pseudelephantopus spicatus is a perennial herb spreading by underground rhizomes. Flowers are white to pinkish or purplish.
