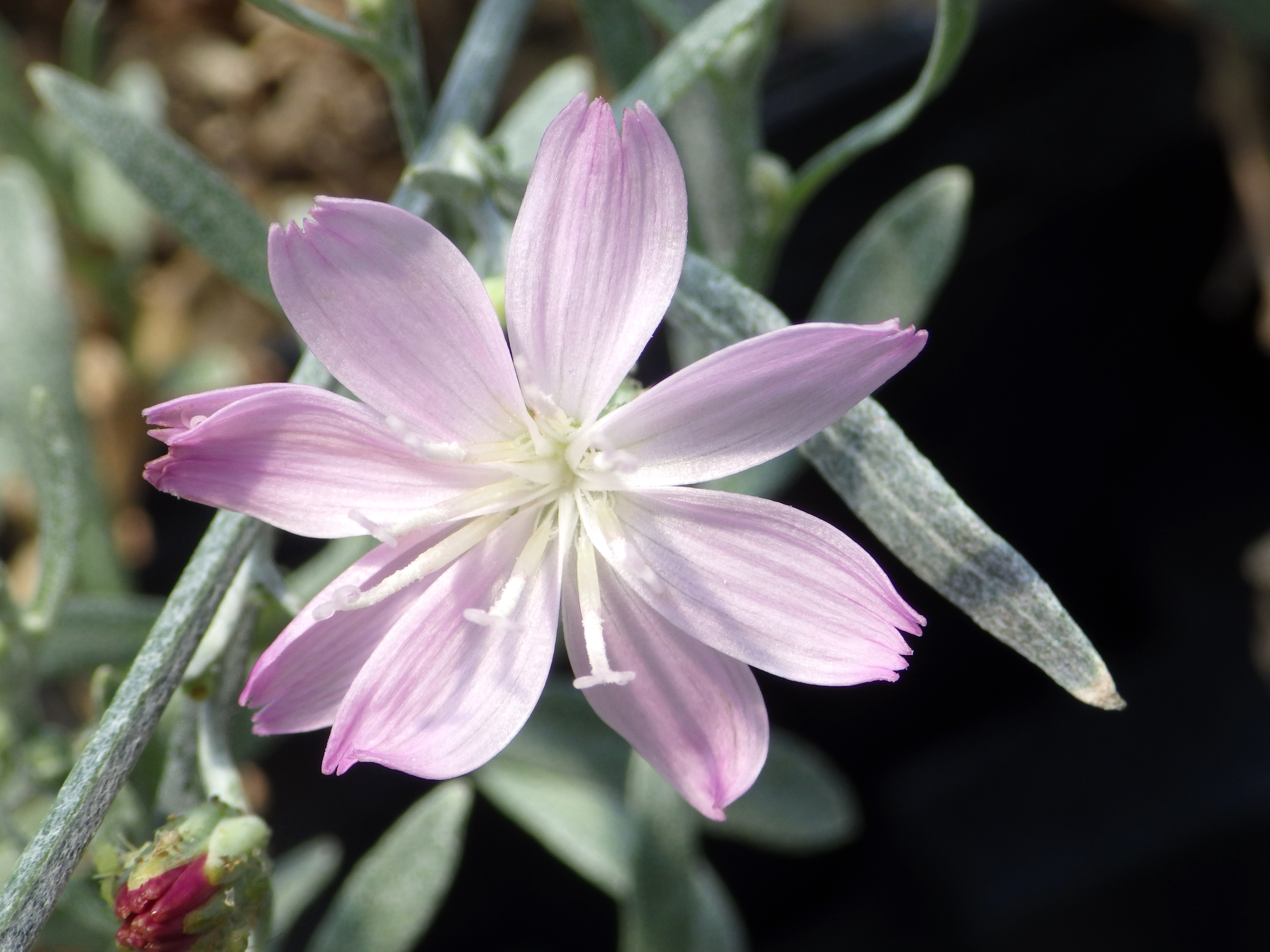

Scientific classification
- Kingdom: Plantae
- Clade: Embryophytes
- Clade: Tracheophytes
- Clade: Spermatophytes
- Clade: Angiosperms
- Clade: Eudicots
- Clade: Asterids
- Order: Asterales
- Family: Asteraceae
- Genus: Stephanomeria
- Species: S. occultata

Binomial name
- Stephanomeria occultata Wellard & J.W.Baker

= Stephanomeria occultata =

Species of plant

Stephanomeria occultata, Disguised Wirelettuce, is a species of rhizomatous flowering plant in the family Asteraceae. It is endemic to northern Utah along the Weber River.

== Origin of its name ==
Stephanomeria occultata was discovered in a parking lot for launching rafts into the river in 2018. Occultata means hidden in Latin. It showed in a Google street view image in 2015, 3 years before its discovery before someone came along and decided to key it. When they realized that it didn't match any species listed, they suspected a new species and that is how Stephanomeria occultata was discovered.
