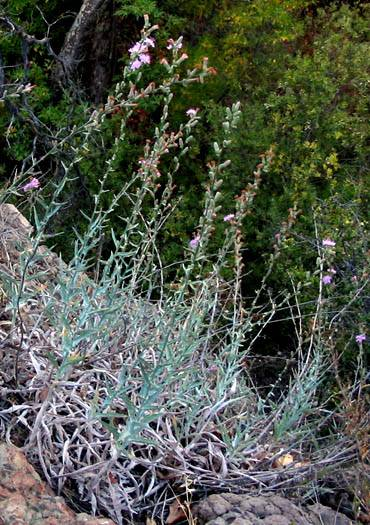

Scientific classification
- Kingdom: Plantae
- Clade: Tracheophytes
- Clade: Angiosperms
- Clade: Eudicots
- Clade: Asterids
- Order: Asterales
- Family: Asteraceae
- Genus: Stephanomeria
- Species: S. cichoriacea

Binomial name
- Stephanomeria cichoriacea A.Gray

= Stephanomeria cichoriacea =

Species of plant

Stephanomeria cichoriacea is a species of flowering plant in the family Asteraceae; it is known by the common names chicoryleaf wirelettuce and silver rock-lettuce. It is endemic to California, where it grows in the coastal mountain ranges as far north as Monterey County, but especially in southern California mountains such as the Transverse Ranges. Its habitat includes chaparral. It is a perennial herb producing slender upright stems reaching maximum heights exceeding one meter. The stem is woolly with hairs, especially on new growth. The leaves are mostly located in a basal rosette, the largest reaching 18 to 20 centimeters long. They are lance-shaped and often toothed along the edges, and the newer ones are woolly. Smaller leaves occur higher up the stem. The inflorescence is a long array of several flower heads, with some occurring in the upper leaf axils as well. Each head has a cylindrical base 1 to 2 centimeters long which is lined with layers of glandular phyllaries. The head contains 10 to 15 ray florets, each with an elongated tube and a pink ligule which may be up to 2 centimeters long. The fruit is an achene tipped with a spreading cluster of long, plumelike pappus bristles.
