= Eremothamnus =

Conservation status
- Least Concern (IUCN 3.1)

Scientific classification
- Kingdom: Plantae
- Clade: Tracheophytes
- Clade: Angiosperms
- Clade: Eudicots
- Clade: Asterids
- Order: Asterales
- Family: Asteraceae
- Subfamily: Cichorioideae
- Genus: Eremothamnus; O.Hoffm.
- Species: E. marlothianus

Binomial name
- Eremothamnus marlothianus O.Hoffm.

Genus of flowering plants

Eremothamnus is a monotypic genus of shrubs in the family Asteraceae. Its only species is Eremothamnus marlothianus. It is native to the coastal desert of Namibia. It is a small shrub with spiny leaves.

== Taxonomy and systematics ==
The genus Eremothamnus was erected in 1889 by Otto Hoffmann, when he named its only species, Eremothamnus marlothianus. The specific epithet is for Rudolf Marloth (1855–1931), a South African botanist, pharmacist, and analytical chemist. The generic name is derived from the Greek words eremos and thamnos. Hoffmann did not give an etymology for the name and it has been supposed that it means "solitary shrub", but "desert shrub" is also a possible interpretation.

Eremothamnus is closely related to Hoplophyllum. These two genera form a clade in the subfamily Cichorioideae. Some authors have placed Eremothamnus in the tribe Arctotideae. In some of the more recent classification systems, Eremothamnus and Hoplophyllum constitute the tribe Eremothamneae.
