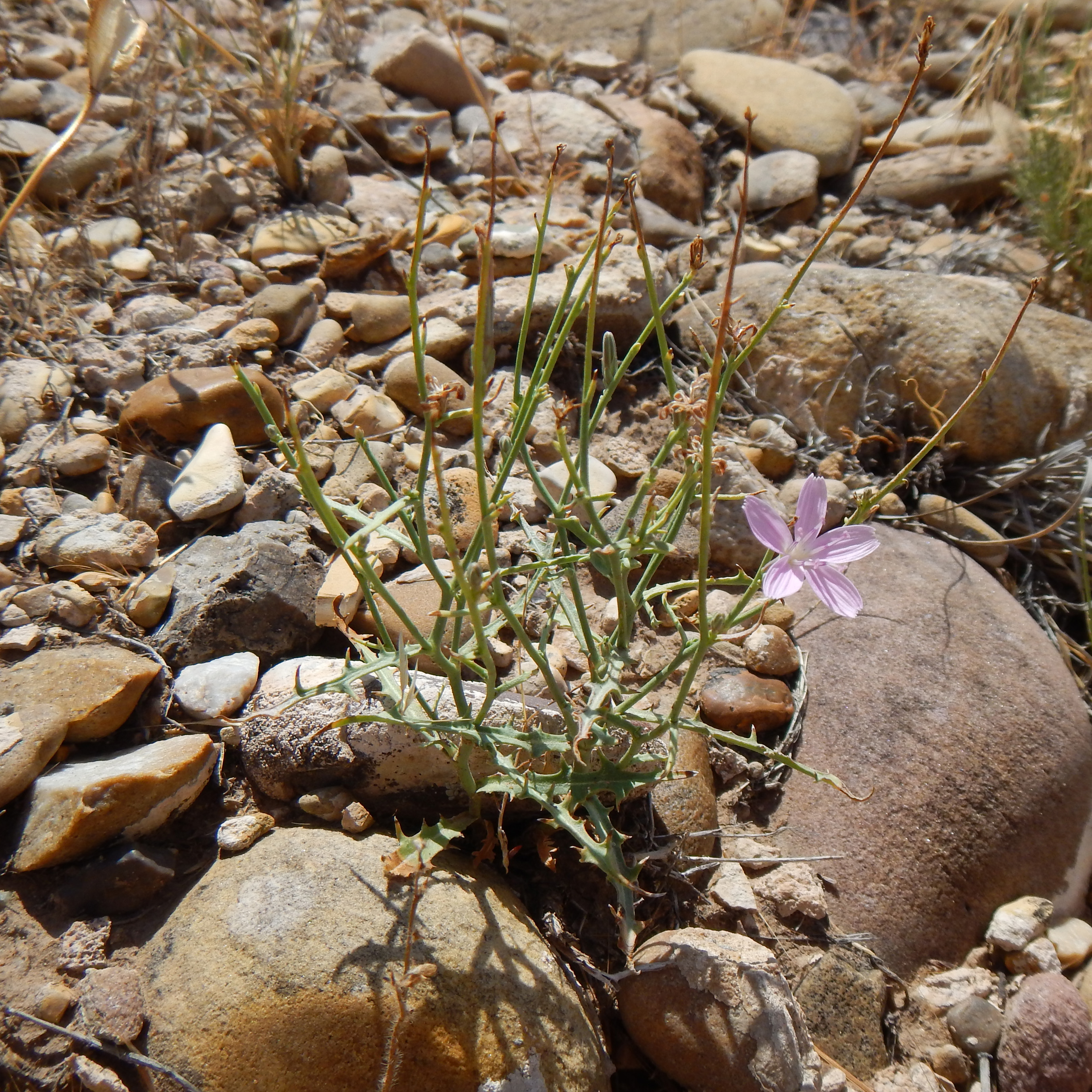

Conservation status
- Secure (NatureServe)

Scientific classification
- Kingdom: Plantae
- Clade: Tracheophytes
- Clade: Angiosperms
- Clade: Eudicots
- Clade: Asterids
- Order: Asterales
- Family: Asteraceae
- Genus: Stephanomeria
- Species: S. runcinata

Binomial name
- Stephanomeria runcinata Nutt.

= Stephanomeria runcinata =

Species of plant

Stephanomeria runcinata is a species of flowering plant in the family Asteraceae known by the common name desert wirelettuce.

== Conservation ==
It was evaluated by NatureServe as globally secure (G5) in 1988. At the state/provincial level they evaluated populations in Alberta, Saskatchewan, and Wyoming as "vulnerable" S3, with Montana, Quebec, and Wyoming as "apparently secure" S4. They evaluate populations in Labrador, Nunavut, and Manitoba as "vulnerable" S3, and the Yukon, Alaska, and Saskatchewan as "imperiled" S2. The only area they assessed the populations as "critically imperiled" S1 at that time was Newfoundland. They have not yet evaluated the rest of the natural range of the species.
