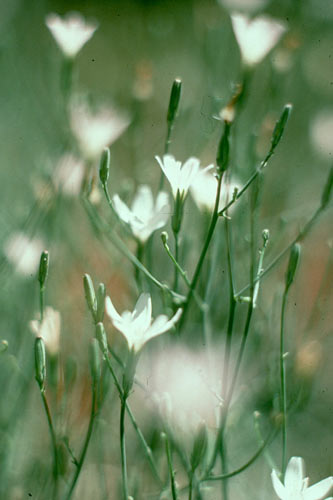

Conservation status
- Endangered (ESA)

Scientific classification
- Kingdom: Plantae
- Clade: Tracheophytes
- Clade: Angiosperms
- Clade: Eudicots
- Clade: Asterids
- Order: Asterales
- Family: Asteraceae
- Genus: Stephanomeria
- Species: S. malheurensis

Binomial name
- Stephanomeria malheurensis Gottlieb

= Stephanomeria malheurensis =

Species of plant

Stephanomeria malheurensis, the Malheur wirelettuce, is a species of flowering plant in the family Asteraceae. It is endemic to Oregon in the United States. It is a federally listed endangered species.

It was discovered in 1966 and the population at the type locality in Harney County is the only one ever known. For several years in the 1980s it disappeared. Scattered individuals have been noted over the years. Plants were grown from seed at the Berry Botanic Garden in Portland and planted at the original site. Some still survived as of 2001.

This species grows atop hills surrounded by flat land. The soils are derived from tuff with a thin top layer of limestone. Associated plants in the habitat include Wyoming big sagebrush, yellow rabbitbrush, basin wildrye, and cheatgrass.

Stephanomeria exigua, the small wirelettuce, grows in the same area, and it is thought that the Malheur wirelettuce evolved from it. S. malheurensis is an annual and is susceptible to invasive species of plants, especially cheatgrass.

It is thought to have evolved outside the usual model of allopatric speciation, from its parental species Stephanomeria exigua. As such this plant is one of the best plant examples of "quantum speciation," a concept closely aligned with peripatric speciation, parapatric speciation and sympatric speciation.
