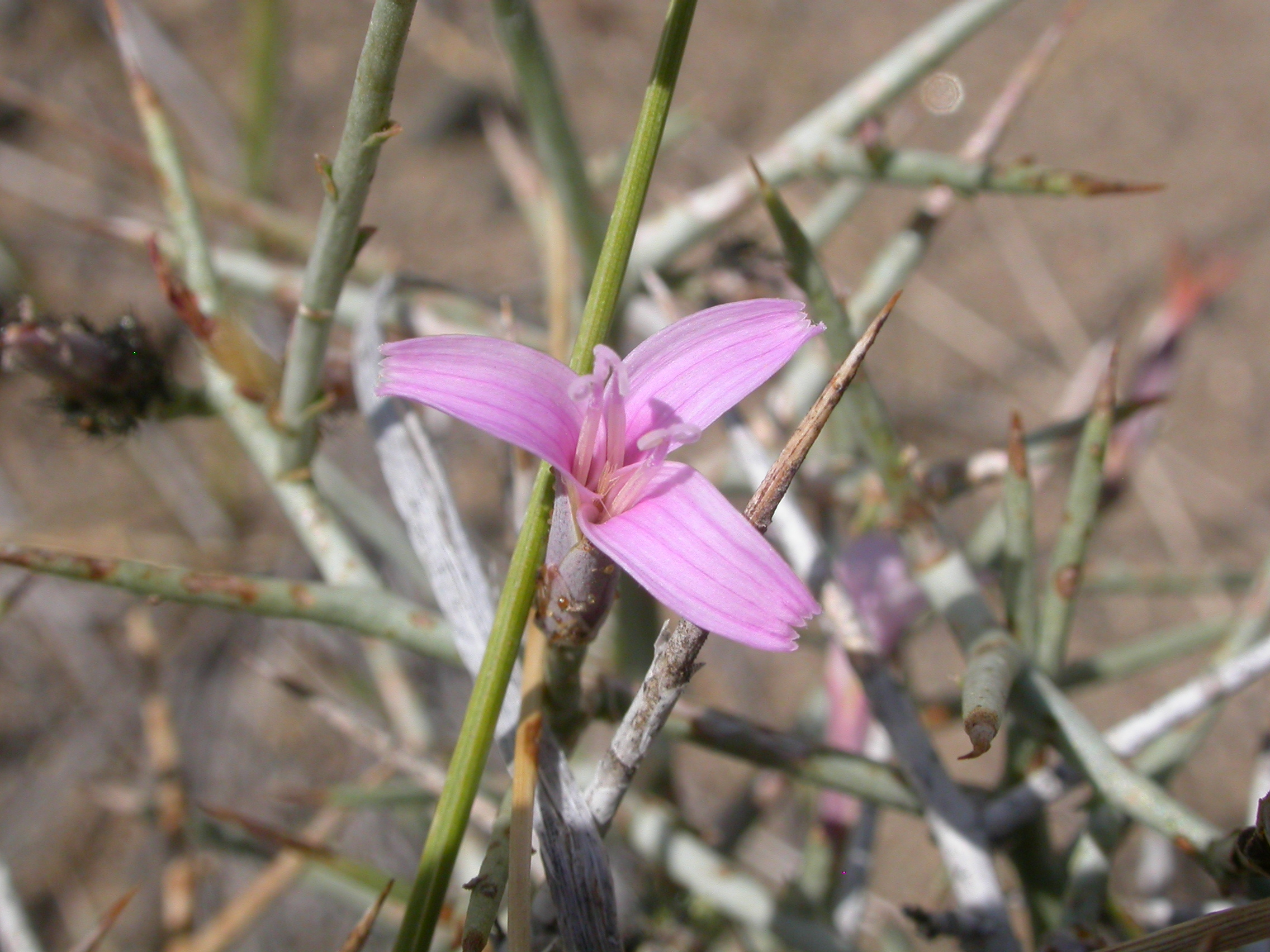

Scientific classification
- Kingdom: Plantae
- Clade: Tracheophytes
- Clade: Angiosperms
- Clade: Eudicots
- Clade: Asterids
- Order: Asterales
- Family: Asteraceae
- Subfamily: Cichorioideae
- Tribe: Cichorieae
- Subtribe: Microseridinae
- Genus: Pleiacanthus (Nutt.) Rydb.
- Species: P. spinosus

Binomial name
- Pleiacanthus spinosus (Nutt.) Rydb.

Synonyms
- Lygodesmia spinosa Stephanomeria spinosa

= Pleiacanthus =

Genus of plants

Pleiacanthus is a monotypic genus of flowering plants in the family Asteraceae containing the single species Pleiacanthus spinosus (formerly Stephanomeria spinosa), which is known by the common name thorn skeletonweed, or thorny skeletonweed. It is native to the western United States from Montana and Idaho to southern California and Arizona, where it grows in many types of mostly dry habitat from deserts to mountains. It is a spindly subshrub producing several slender stems up to 40 or 50 centimeters tall from a woody caudex. The stems divide many times into short, rigid branches which narrow to sharp thorn-tips. The plant is mostly hairless except for brownish woolly tufts at the base and below the basal leaves. The leaves are small and linear on the lower stem, and reduced to scale-like growths on the upper branches. Flower heads occur near the ends of the branches. Each has a cylindrical base wrapped in one layer of phyllaries. The head contains 3 to 5 ray florets, each with an elongated tube and a pale to bright pink ligule. The fruit is an achene tipped with a cluster of pappus bristles which are not plumelike as are those of the Stephanomeria species with which this plant was once classified.
