= Platycarpha =

Scientific classification
- Kingdom: Plantae
- Clade: Tracheophytes
- Clade: Angiosperms
- Clade: Eudicots
- Clade: Asterids
- Order: Asterales
- Family: Asteraceae
- Tribe: Platycarpheae
- Genus: Platycarpha; Less.
- Species: P. glomerata

Binomial name
- Platycarpha glomerata (Thunb.) Less.

Synonyms
- Cynara glomerata Thunb. (1800) (basionym); Platycarpha calvescens Gand.; Platycarpha ecklonis Gand.; Stobaea glomerata (Thunb.) Spreng.

Genus of plants

Platycarpha is a genus of South African plants within the family Asteraceae. It contains a single species, Platycarpha glomerata, which is native to the Cape Provinces and KwaZulu-Natal in South Africa.

The name Platycarpha is derived from two Greek words, platys "broad" and karphos "a chip of straw or wood, a scale, a dry stalk". The name was first used by Christian Friedrich Lessing in 1831. The type species is Platycarpha glomerata. This species had been named Cynara glomerata by Carl Peter Thunberg in 1800, and was moved to Platycarpha by A.P. de Candolle in 1836 in Prodromus Systematis Naturalis Regni Vegetabilis.

The genus formerly contained three species. Studies suggested splitting Platycarpha into two genera, Platycarpha and Platycarphella, with two species placed in Platycarphella. The systematic position of Platycarpha has long been regarded with uncertainty. Most authors have placed it in the tribe Arctotideae until molecular phylogenetic studies showed it to be closer to Vernonieae. In 2009, the new tribe Platycarpheae was established for Platycarpha and Platycarphella.
