= Llerasia fuliginea =

Conservation status
- Endangered (IUCN 3.1)

Scientific classification
- Kingdom: Plantae
- Clade: Tracheophytes
- Clade: Angiosperms
- Clade: Eudicots
- Clade: Asterids
- Order: Asterales
- Family: Asteraceae
- Genus: Llerasia
- Species: L. fuliginea

Binomial name
- Llerasia fuliginea (Kunth) Cuatrec.

Synonyms
- Baccharis fuliginea Kunth; Bigelowia fuliginea (Kunth) A.Gray; Haplopappus fuligineus (Kunth) S.F.Blake; Neosyris fuliginea (Kunth) Greene

Species of flowering plant

Llerasia fuliginea is a species of flowering plant in the family Asteraceae. It is found only in Ecuador. It is native to high-elevation subalpine grassland (páramo) from 3,000 to 3,500 metres elevation. It is threatened by habitat loss.

The species was first described as Baccharis fuliginea by Carl Sigismund Kunth in 1818. In 1970 José Cuatrecasas placed the species in genus Llerasia as L. fuliginea.
