= Chaetadelpha =

Scientific classification
- Kingdom: Plantae
- Clade: Embryophytes
- Clade: Tracheophytes
- Clade: Spermatophytes
- Clade: Angiosperms
- Clade: Eudicots
- Clade: Asterids
- Order: Asterales
- Family: Asteraceae
- Subfamily: Cichorioideae
- Tribe: Cichorieae
- Subtribe: Microseridinae
- Genus: Chaetadelpha; A.Gray ex S.Watson
- Species: C. wheeleri

Binomial name
- Chaetadelpha wheeleri A.Gray ex S.Wats.

Synonyms
- Stephanomeria wheeleri (A.Gray ex S.Watson) A.Nelson & J.F.Macbr

Genus of flowering plants

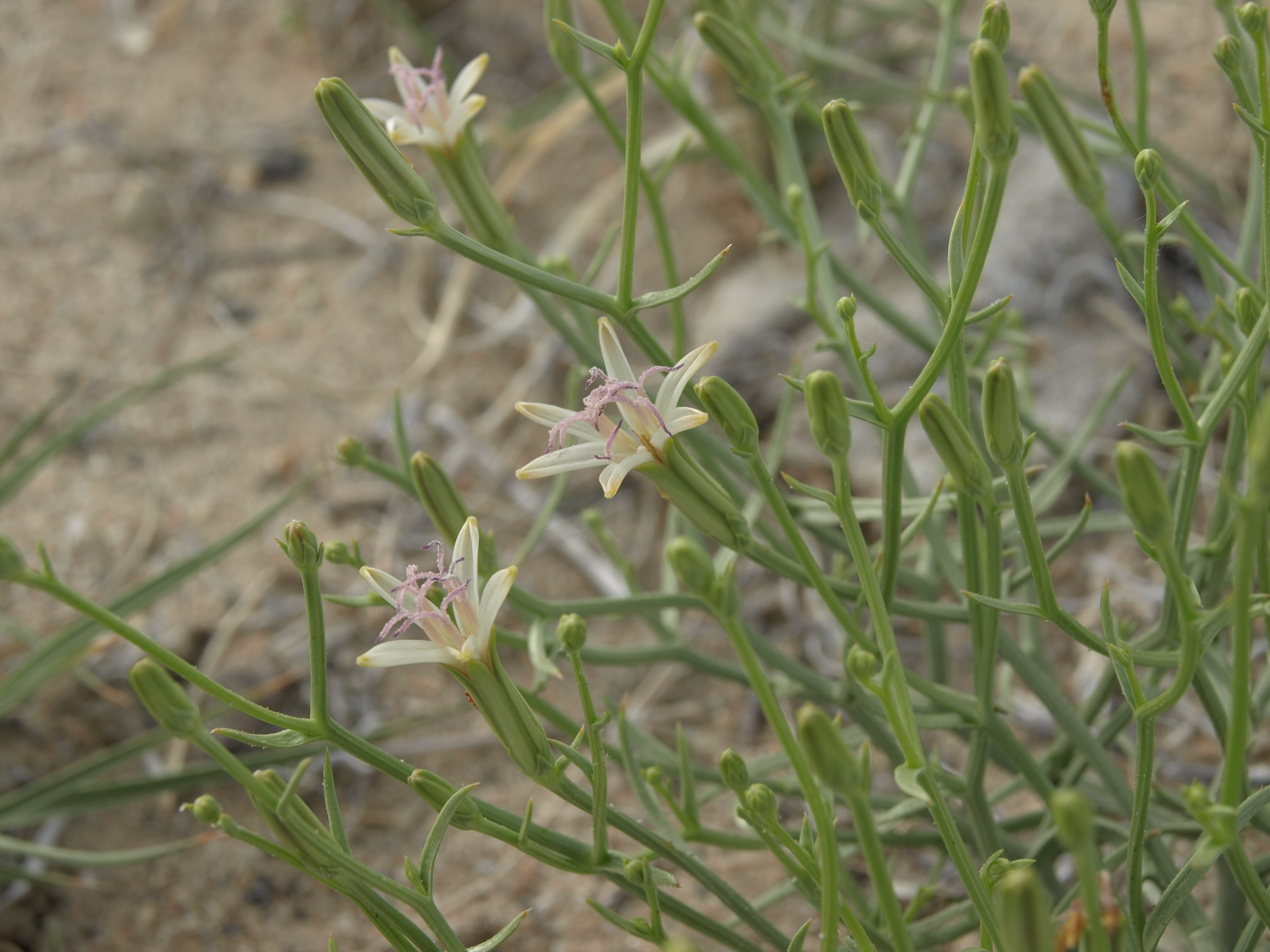
Dune wirelettuce in the White Mountains, elevation 1560 m (5120 ft)

Chaetadelpha is a genus of plants in the family Asteraceae containing the single species Chaetadelpha wheeleri, or Wheeler's skeletonweed. This brushy perennial plant is native to the western United States (Nevada, eastern California, southeastern Oregon).

Chaetadelpha wheeleri forms a low bush with plentiful erect stems covered in very narrow, long and pointed leaves. Branchlets emerge from the stems and each bears a cylindrical flower which opens at the end into a star-shaped white or pale purple flower with five ray florets. The center of each head is filled with curly pollen-dusted anthers. This species is found most often in sand and scrub, particularly in desert regions.
