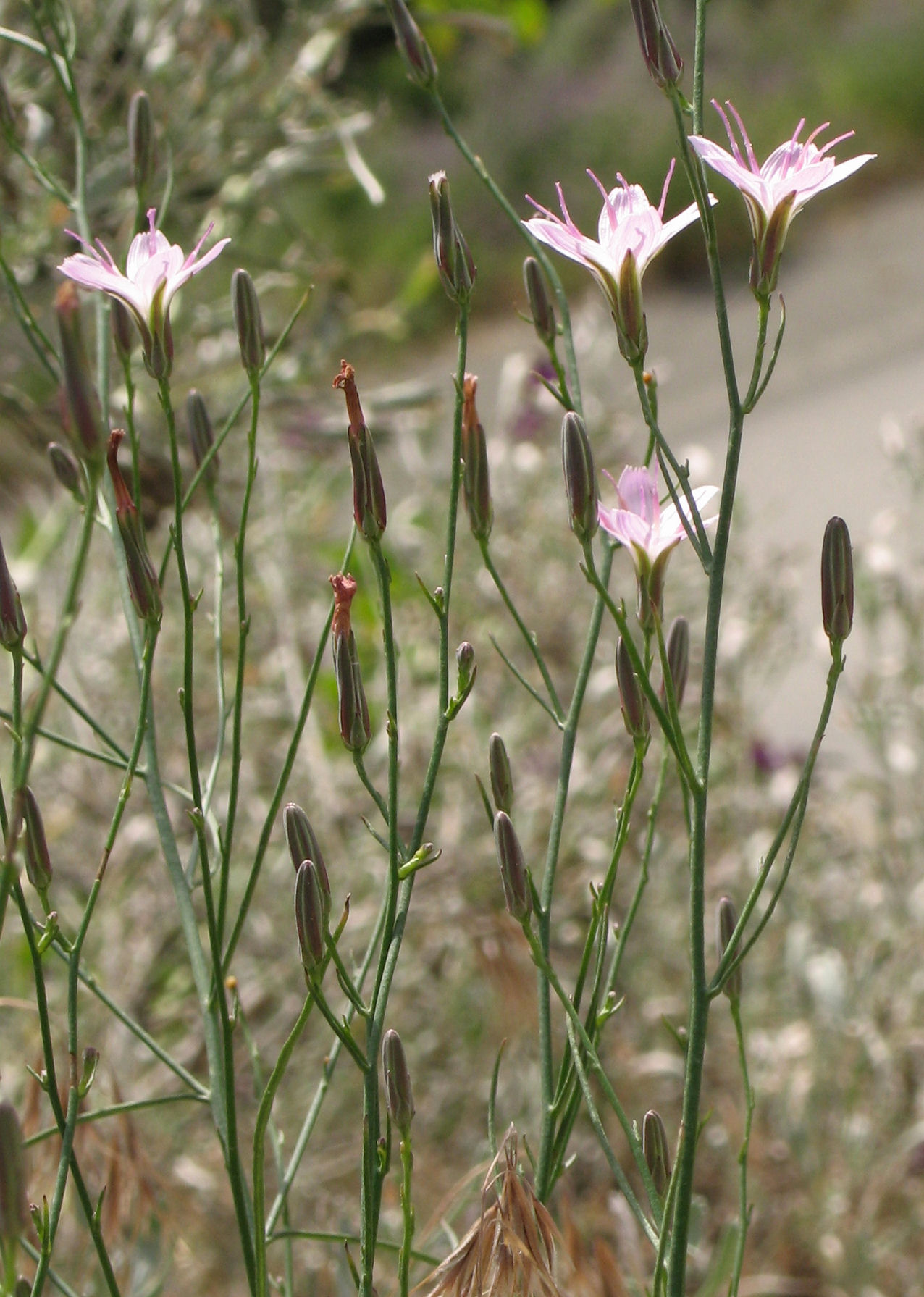

Conservation status
- Secure (NatureServe)

Scientific classification
- Kingdom: Plantae
- Clade: Tracheophytes
- Clade: Angiosperms
- Clade: Eudicots
- Clade: Asterids
- Order: Asterales
- Family: Asteraceae
- Genus: Stephanomeria
- Species: S. tenuifolia

Binomial name
- Stephanomeria tenuifolia (Raf.) H.M.Hall

= Stephanomeria tenuifolia =

Species of plant

Stephanomeria tenuifolia, the narrow-leaved wire-lettuce or narrow leaved stephanomeria, is a perennial plant in the family Asteraceae that grows in the Great Basin of the western United States. It has five ray flowers that give it the appearance of being petals of a single flower of a plant in another plant family.

== Growth pattern ==
It grows with much branching from 1/2 to 2 feet (0.15 to 0.61 m).

== Leaves and stems ==
Leaves are threadlike.

== Inflorescence and fruit ==
The inflorescence is a head with 5 square-tipped, petal-like ray flowers and sepal-like phyllaries.

Fruits are seeds attached to parachute-like pappi.

== Habitat and range ==
Narrow leaved stephanomeria grows in the plains and dry slopes in sagebrush steppe, mixed conifer, and mountain shrub communities in the Great Basin. In California it can be found in sagebrush scrub, Northern juniper woodland, yellow pine forest, red fir forest, lodgepole forest, and subalpine forest plant communities.
