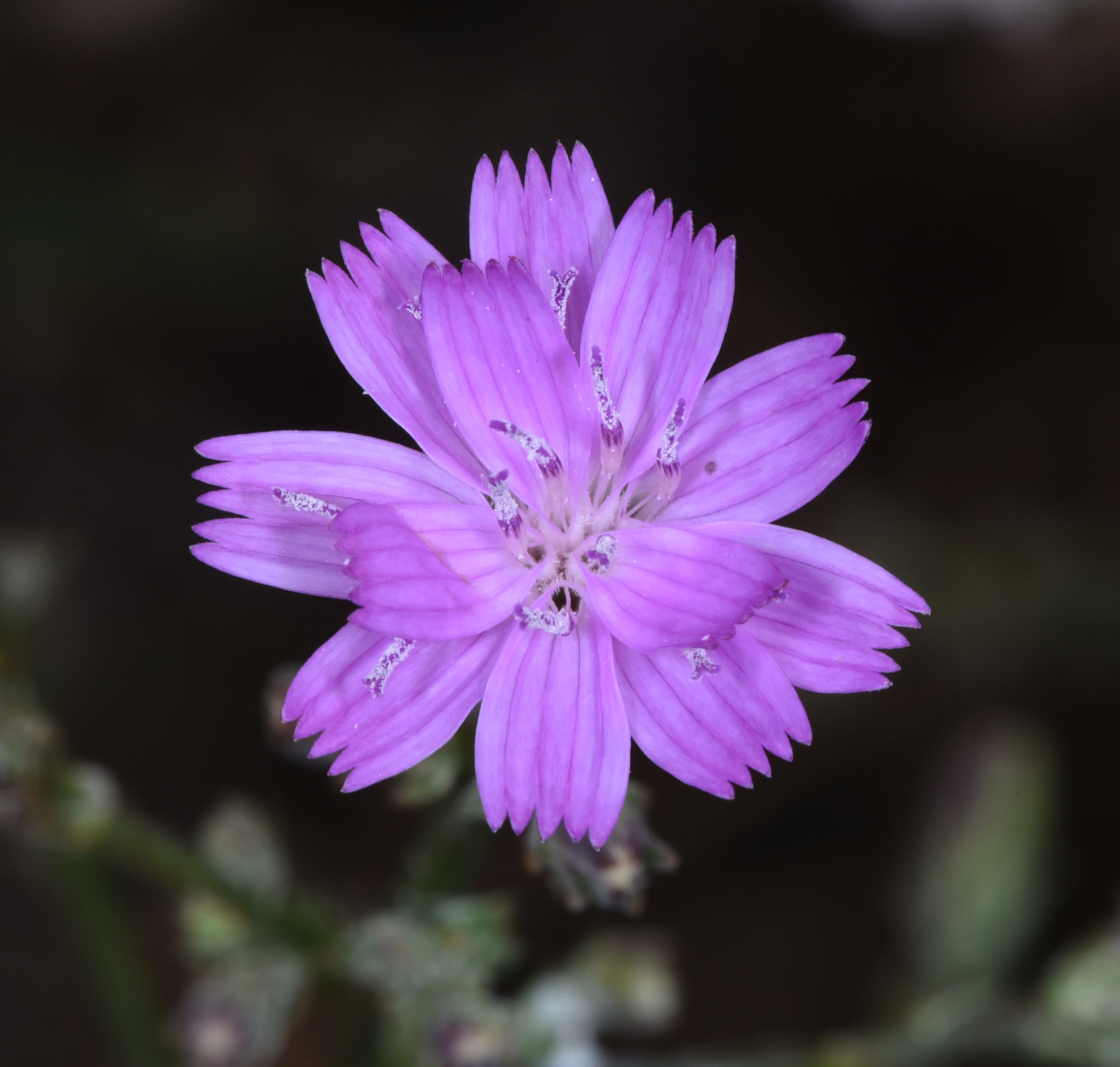

Scientific classification
- Kingdom: Plantae
- Clade: Tracheophytes
- Clade: Angiosperms
- Clade: Eudicots
- Clade: Asterids
- Order: Asterales
- Family: Asteraceae
- Genus: Stephanomeria
- Species: S. elata

Binomial name
- Stephanomeria elata Nutt.

= Stephanomeria elata =

Species of plant

Stephanomeria elata is a species of flowering plant in the family Asteraceae known by the common names Santa Barbara wirelettuce and Nuttall's wirelettuce. It is native to Oregon and California, where it grows in coastal and inland mountain ranges, including the Sierra Nevada. It can be found in many types of habitat. It is an annual herb producing a slender, upright stem often exceeding one meter in maximum height. It is hairy to hairless and glandular. The leaves are mostly located in a basal rosette, the largest reaching 10 centimeters long. Smaller, much-reduced leaves occur higher up the stem. The leaves drop early, rendering the plant naked for most of the year. Flowers occur singly or in small clusters along the stiff branches. Each head contains up to 15 or 16 ray florets with an elongated tube and a pink ligule 6 or 7 millimeters long. The fruit is an achene tipped with a spreading cluster of long, plumelike pappus bristles.
