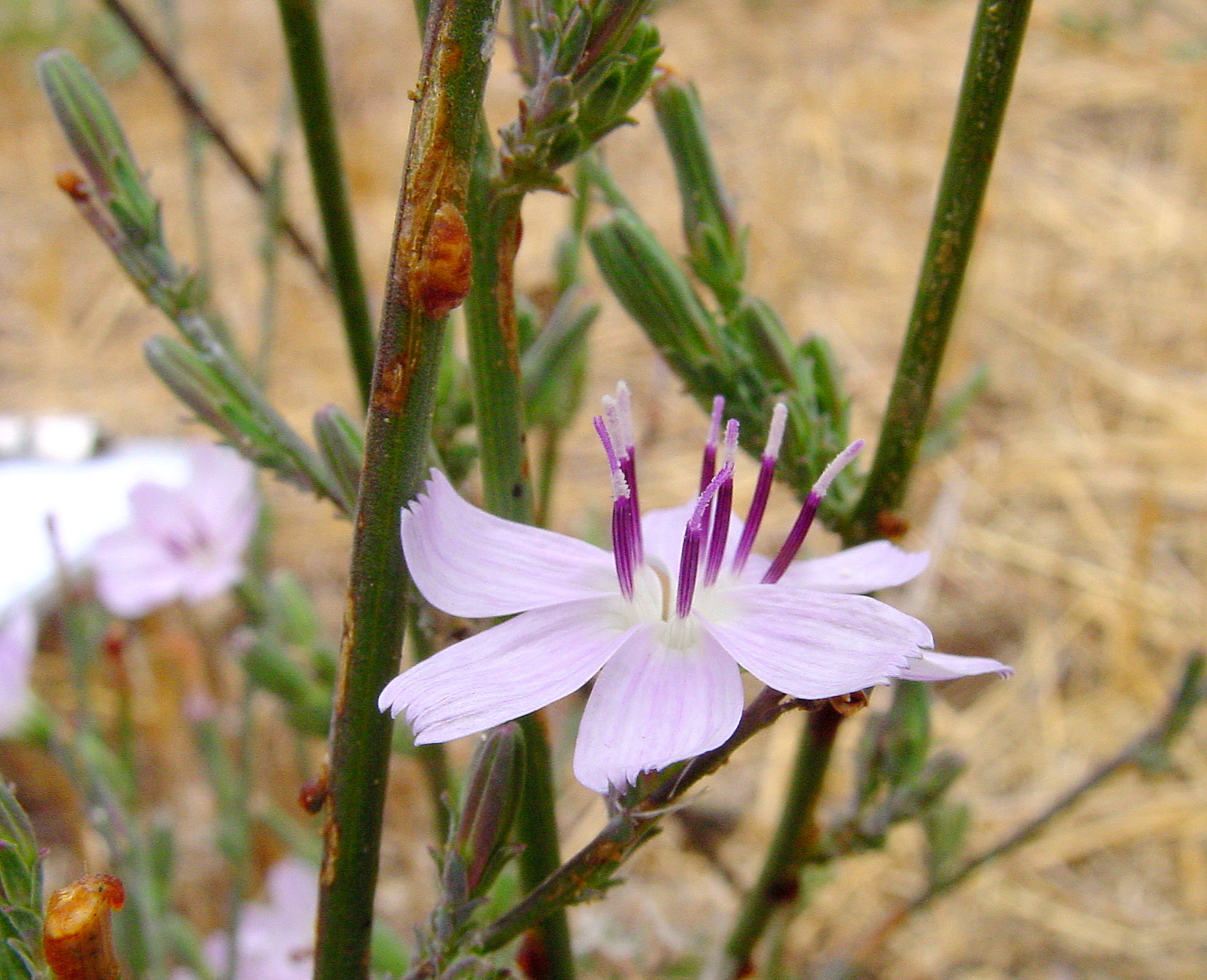

Scientific classification
- Kingdom: Plantae
- Clade: Tracheophytes
- Clade: Angiosperms
- Clade: Eudicots
- Clade: Asterids
- Order: Asterales
- Family: Asteraceae
- Genus: Stephanomeria
- Species: S. virgata

Binomial name
- Stephanomeria virgata Benth.

= Stephanomeria virgata =

Species of plant

Stephanomeria virgata, commonly called rod wirelettuce, twiggy wreath plant, and virgate wirelettuce, is a herbaceous annual plant of the family Asteraceae. It can be found growing in Western North America, specifically California, but also in Oregon and Nevada and northern Mexico. This plant can be found in dry, open habitat types at elevations below 2100 meters. S. virgata is sometimes used as an ornamental plant.

== Description ==
Stephanomeria virgata is an annual plant and grows 5 to 30 centimeters tall. The stem may be hairless or woolly. It is long and has dense branches. Leaves on the lower plant are rosetted around the base. They are oblong and lobed. On the upper plant the leaves are small, linear in shape, and smooth edged without lobes. Flower heads occur at intervals on the branches and contain 5 to 9 ray florets. The fruit is an achene with a pappus of white bristles.

== Early classification ==
Stephanomeria virgata formerly included plants that now belong to the species Stephanomeria diegensis.
