= Leslie D. Gottlieb =

American biologist

Leslie David Gottlieb
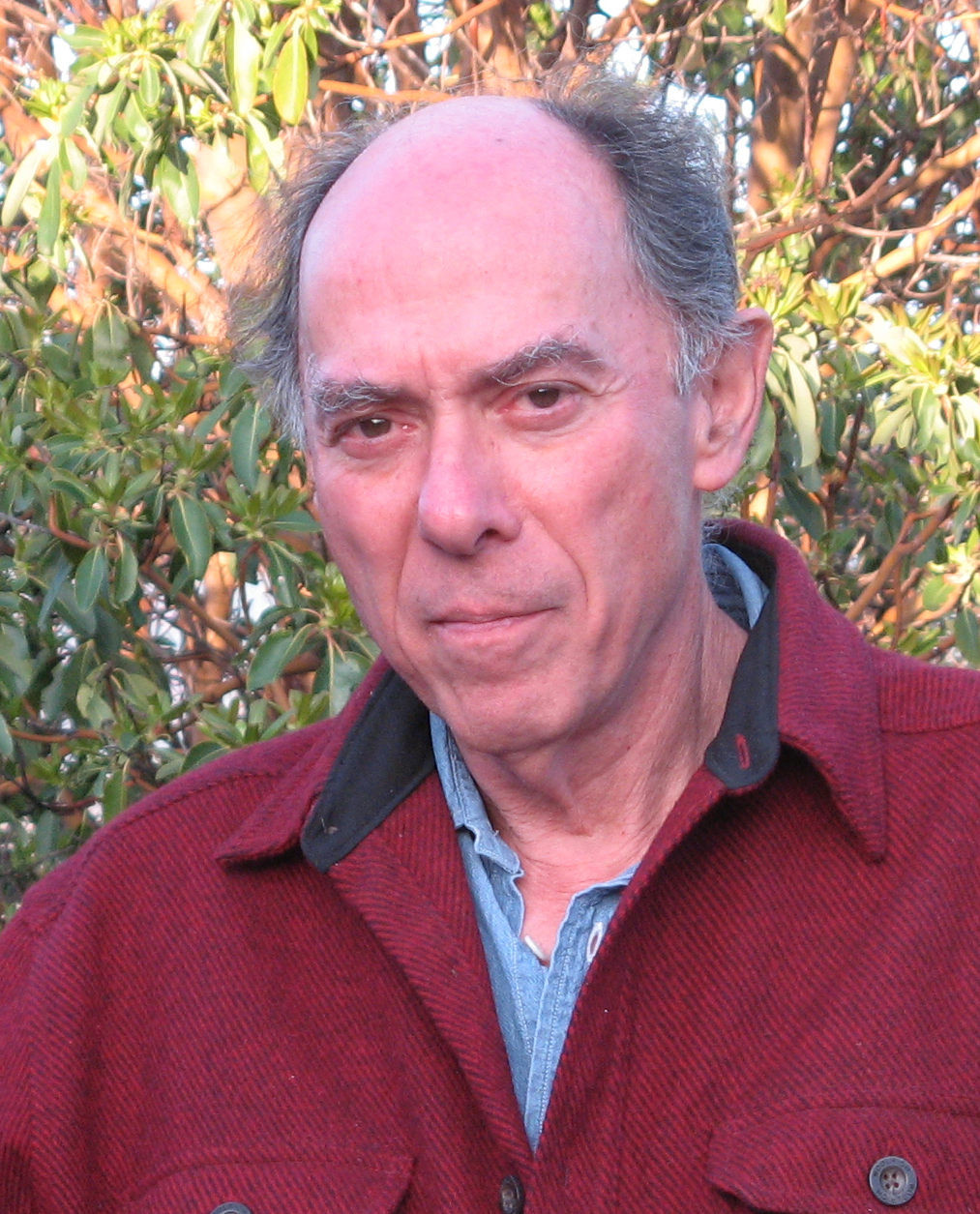
- Ashland, Oregon
- Born: 1936; New York City
- Died: 2012 (aged 75–76); Oregon, U.S.
- Education: Cornell University; Oregon State University; University of Michigan
- Spouses: Mary Gottlieb; Vera Ford
- Children: 2
- Awards: John Simon Guggenheim Fellowship (1975); Fellow of the American Association for the Advancement of Science (1985); Botanical Society of America Merit Award (2000); Botanical Society of America Centennial Fellow Award (2006)
- Scientific career
- Fields: Biology

Leslie David Gottlieb (1936–2012) was a United States biologist described by the Botanical Society of America as "one of the most influential plant evolutionary biologists over the past several decades". He was employed at the University of California, Davis for 34 years, and published widely. In addition to his primary work in plant genetics, Gottlieb was an advocate for rare and endangered plant conservation.

== Education ==
Following a Bachelor of Arts degree in English from Cornell University in 1957, Gottlieb's career began at Oregon State University in the Botany and Plant Pathology Department. He earned a master's degree in December 1965 with major professor Dr. Kenton Chambers and wrote a thesis on hybridization between species of manzanita (Arctostaphylos) trees in southwestern Oregon. His PhD at the University of Michigan 1969 examined patterns of diversity and mechanisms of speciation in Stephanomeria. He was a faculty member of the Department of Genetics at the University of California, Davis from 1970 until 2004.

== Research ==
Gottlieb researched a broad array of subjects including plant systematics, plant speciation (Quantum Speciation), polyploidy, gene duplication, biochemical evolution of isozymes and molecular genetics, and published more than 120 research papers and received a number of awards including a John Simon Guggenheim Fellowship (1975) and Fellowship of the American Association for the Advancement of Science (1985). In 1993 he was named Alumni Association Fellow of Oregon State University. In 1965 he earned his master's degree and wrote a thesis on hybridization between species of manzanita in southwestern Oregon.

=== Literary work ===
In 1975 Gottlieb wrote a comparison of the two ways Charles Darwin, as a scientist, and Herman Melville, as an artist, viewed the Galapagos Islands. According to Gottlieb, Darwin saw the Galápagos Islands as a "laboratory where he was able to examine closely process of evolution and the origin of species," while Melville "used them to derive a set of symbols to express his perception of the human condition." Gottlieb concluded that the Galápagos of Darwin and Melville "have different uses and appeal to different sensibilities."

== Later life and death ==
During 2011, Gottlieb received treatment for pancreatic cancer and had a good period of recovery until the end of the year. Early in 2012 the cancer had returned and following complications associated with the disease, Gottlieb died on January 31, 2012.

== Legacy ==
Gottlieb has been described as "one of the most influential plant evolutionary biologists over the past several decades." Leslie Gottlieb was honored at a Colloquium in 2013 which updated and extended many of his research areas, as well as by a 2014 theme issue of Philosophical Transactions of the Royal Society B.

Crawford et al. state "Leslie Gottlieb was interested in floral development before the age of genomics and the evolution of development (evo-devo)..." Hileman states that the genetic changes studied in the model plant Antirrhinum majus were identified by Gottlieb as being of the type that "may provide genetic information about floral traits that distinguish species or genera."

The Leslie and Vera Gottlieb Research Fund in Plant Evolutionary Biology was established in 2006 to provide funds to graduate students to support both laboratory and field research in the evolutionary biology of plants native to western North America. This is a broad field that includes evolutionary and population genetics, systematics and phylogenetic studies, comparative analyses of development, and physiological and biochemical studies of plant adaptations. The Research Fund will provide an annual award of $5000.
