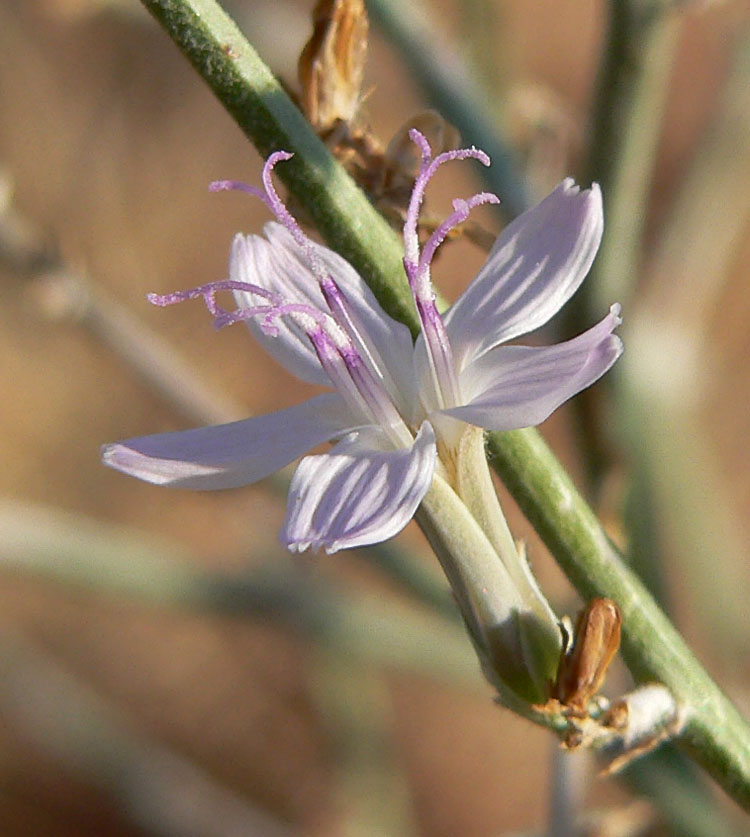

Conservation status
- Secure (NatureServe)

Scientific classification
- Kingdom: Plantae
- Clade: Tracheophytes
- Clade: Angiosperms
- Clade: Eudicots
- Clade: Asterids
- Order: Asterales
- Family: Asteraceae
- Genus: Stephanomeria
- Species: S. pauciflora

Binomial name
- Stephanomeria pauciflora (Torr.) A.Nelson

= Stephanomeria pauciflora =

Species of plant

Stephanomeria pauciflora is a species of flowering plant in the aster family known by the common names brownplume wirelettuce, few-flowered wirelettuce, and prairie skeletonplant. It is native to the southwestern United States and northern Mexico, where it grows in many types of habitat, including many desert areas, woodlands, and plains. It is a perennial herb or bushy subshrub producing one or more sturdy, stiff stems with many spreading branches, taking a rounded but vertical form. The leaves are mostly basal and ephemeral, with smaller, scale-like leaves occurring on the upper stem. Flower heads occur at intervals along the mostly naked stems, especially near the tips. Each has a cylindrical base covered in hairless phyllaries. It contains 3 to 6 florets, each with an elongated tube and a flat pink ligule. The fruit is an achene tipped with a spreading cluster of plumelike pappus bristles. These are usually brownish, but are sometimes white. The specific epithet pauciflora, refers to the Latin term for 'few flowered'.
