= Hoplophyllum =

Scientific classification
- Kingdom: Plantae
- Clade: Tracheophytes
- Clade: Angiosperms
- Clade: Eudicots
- Clade: Asterids
- Order: Asterales
- Family: Asteraceae
- Subfamily: Vernonioideae
- Tribe: Eremothamneae
- Genus: Hoplophyllum; DC.

Type species
- Hoplophyllum spinosum DC.

Species
- Hoplophyllum ferox Sond.; Hoplophyllum spinosum DC.

Genus of flowering plants

Hoplophyllum is a genus of flowering plants in the family Asteraceae. It has two species, Hoplophyllum spinosum and Hoplophyllum ferox, both native to South Africa.

Both species are shrubs. The leaves are hard and spine-tipped, much longer than wide, and either cylindrical or somewhat flattened. They are grooved with stripes running lengthwise. The type species is Hoplophyllum spinosum.

Hoplophyllum is derived from two Greek words, hoplon "a tool or weapon" and phyllon "a leaf", a reference to the spiny leaves.

The name Hoplophyllum was originated in 1836 by A.P. de Candolle when he assigned Hoplophyllum spinosum to this genus in his classic work Prodromus Systematis Naturalis Regni Vegetabilis. This species had originally been named Pteronia spinosa by Linnaeus filius in 1782 in his book Supplementum Plantarum.

The closest relative of Hoplophyllum is Eremothamnus, another native of southern Africa. In one classification, published in 2009, these two formed the tribe Eremothamneae. Other authors have placed them in the tribe Arctotideae.
