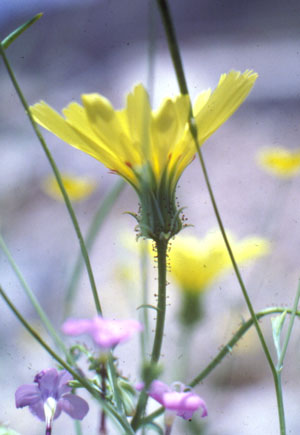

Scientific classification
- Kingdom: Plantae
- Clade: Embryophytes
- Clade: Tracheophytes
- Clade: Angiosperms
- Clade: Eudicots
- Clade: Asterids
- Order: Asterales
- Family: Asteraceae
- Genus: Calycoseris
- Species: C. parryi

Binomial name
- Calycoseris parryi A.Gray

= Calycoseris parryi =

Species of flowering plant

Calycoseris parryi, the yellow tackstem, is a spring wildflower found in the Mojave Desert, the Sonoran Desert, and surrounding regions of the southwestern United States and northwestern Mexico. It is found in California, Nevada, Utah, Arizona, and Baja California.

Calycoseris parryi grows up to 30 centimeters (12 inches) tall in sandy soils below 6,000 feet. The plant has yellow flowers with leaves up to 4.5 inches (11.25 cm) long, and is part of the Sunflower Family.
