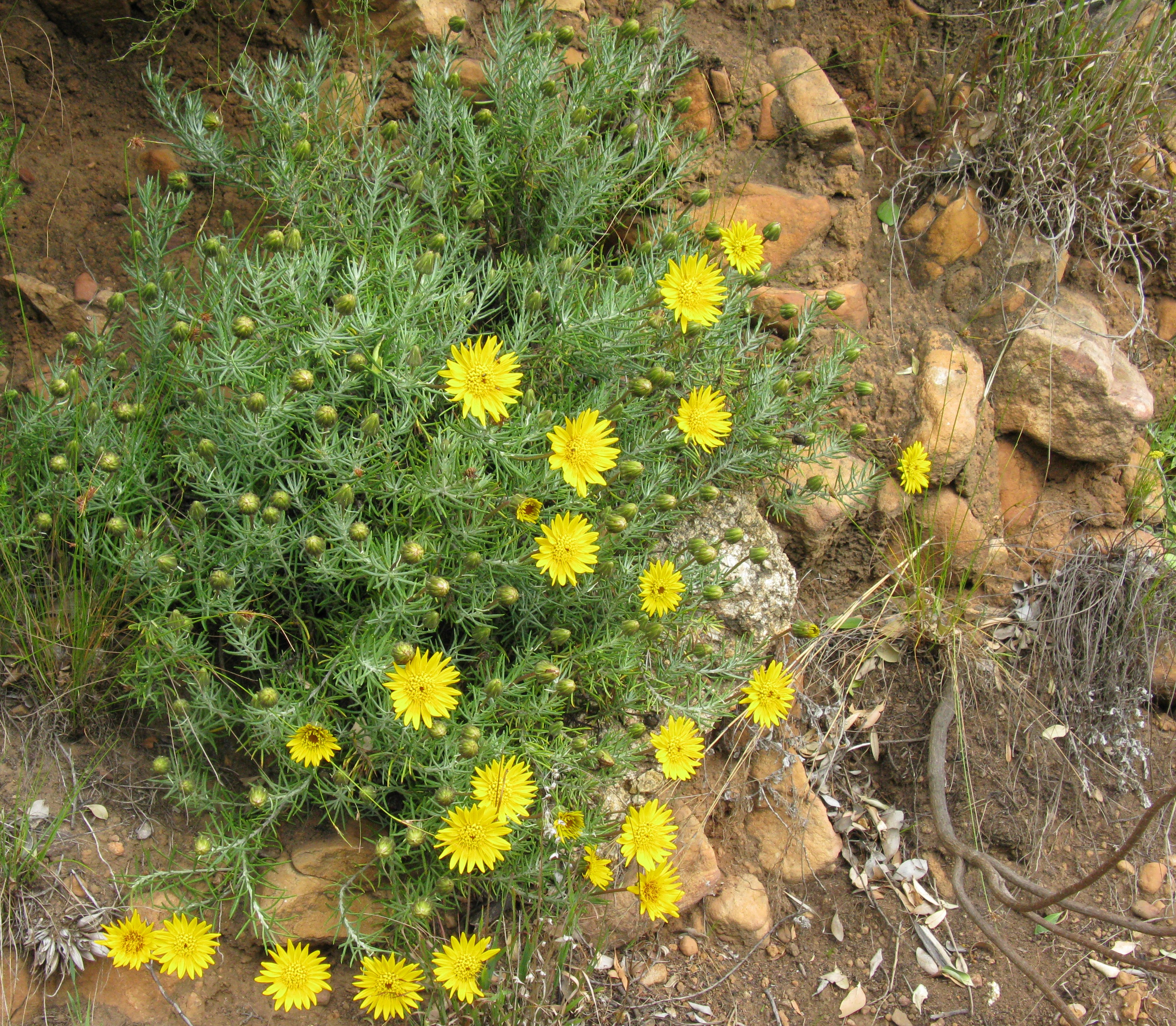
- Heterolepis aliena in native habitat fynbos

Scientific classification
- Kingdom: Plantae
- Clade: Embryophytes
- Clade: Tracheophytes
- Clade: Angiosperms
- Clade: Eudicots
- Clade: Asterids
- Order: Asterales
- Family: Asteraceae
- Tribe: Arctotideae
- Genus: Heterolepis; Cass. (1820) not Ehrenb. ex Boiss. (1820) (Poaceae)

Type species
- Heterolepis aliena Cass.

Species
- Heterolepis aliena; Heterolepis mitis; Heterolepis peduncularis

= Heterolepis =

Genus of plants

Heterolepis is a genus of flowering plants in the sunflower family. It has three or four species, all endemic to the Western Cape Province in South Africa.

Heterolepis species are shrublets, typically sprawling and about 30 cm high with moderately large yellow flowers. The flowerheads are solitary with glandular peduncles, the surrounding green bracts having membranous margins, especially in the inner rows. The ray florets are female, with a thread-like lobe opposite the ray. The disk florets are bisexual. The seeds (properly speaking the fruits) are flask-shaped, silky, with a pappus of two unequal rows of bristly, barbed scales. The leaves are alternate, typically 15–30 mm long, narrow or needle-like, sharply pointed, thick, and quite stiff, with the margins rolled under, woolly beneath. The rootstock is woody, and branches cobwebby. The plants occur mainly on rocky sandstone slopes in the mountains of the Western Cape in South Africa.

The name Heterolepis is derived from two Greek words, heteros "different, dissimilar" and lepis "a scale". This name was created in 1820 by Alexandre de Cassini for a plant that had been named Arnica inuloides by Martin Vahl in 1791. One year after transferring this species to Heterolepis, Cassini changed the specific epithet, thus creating the superfluous combination Heterolepis decipiens in 1821.

The relationships of Heterolepis to other genera in Asteraceae are not well understood. It is related to the tribe Arctotideae. Some authors have placed it within that tribe as a matter of convenience until more can be learned about it.

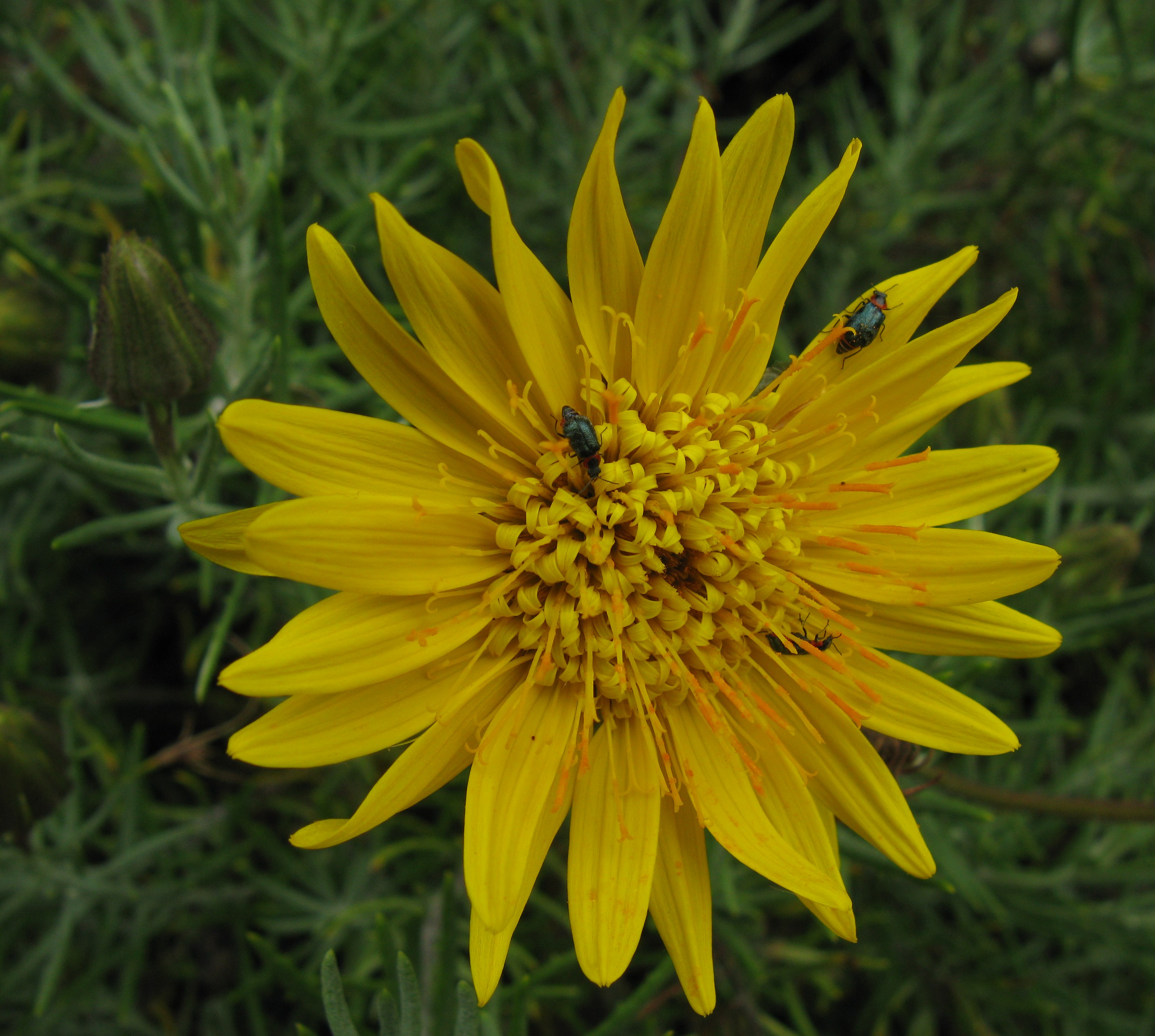
Heterolepis aliena, flowerhead attended by pollinating beetles

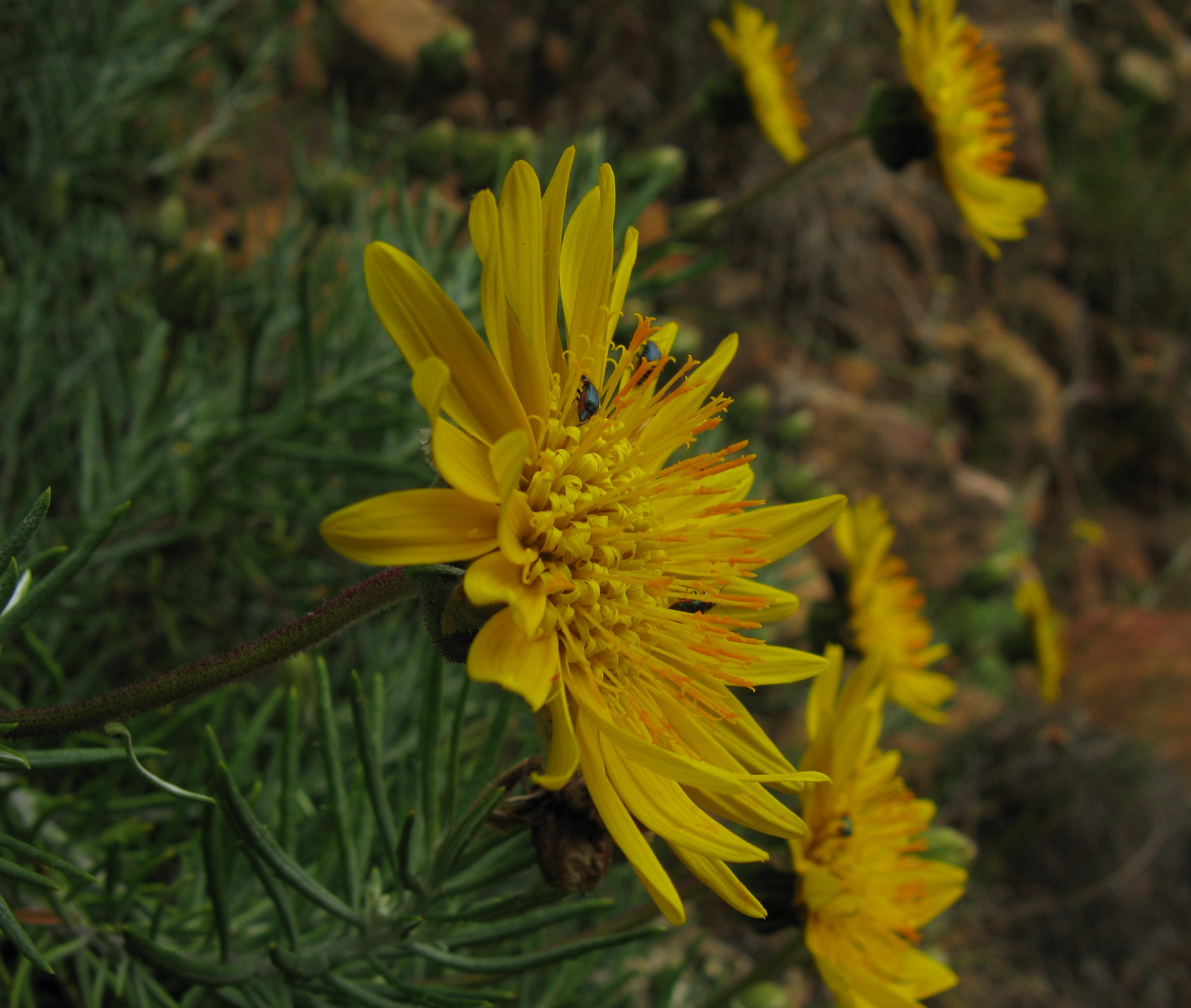
Heterolepis aliena, lateral aspect of flowerhead, showing protruding stamens and pistils
