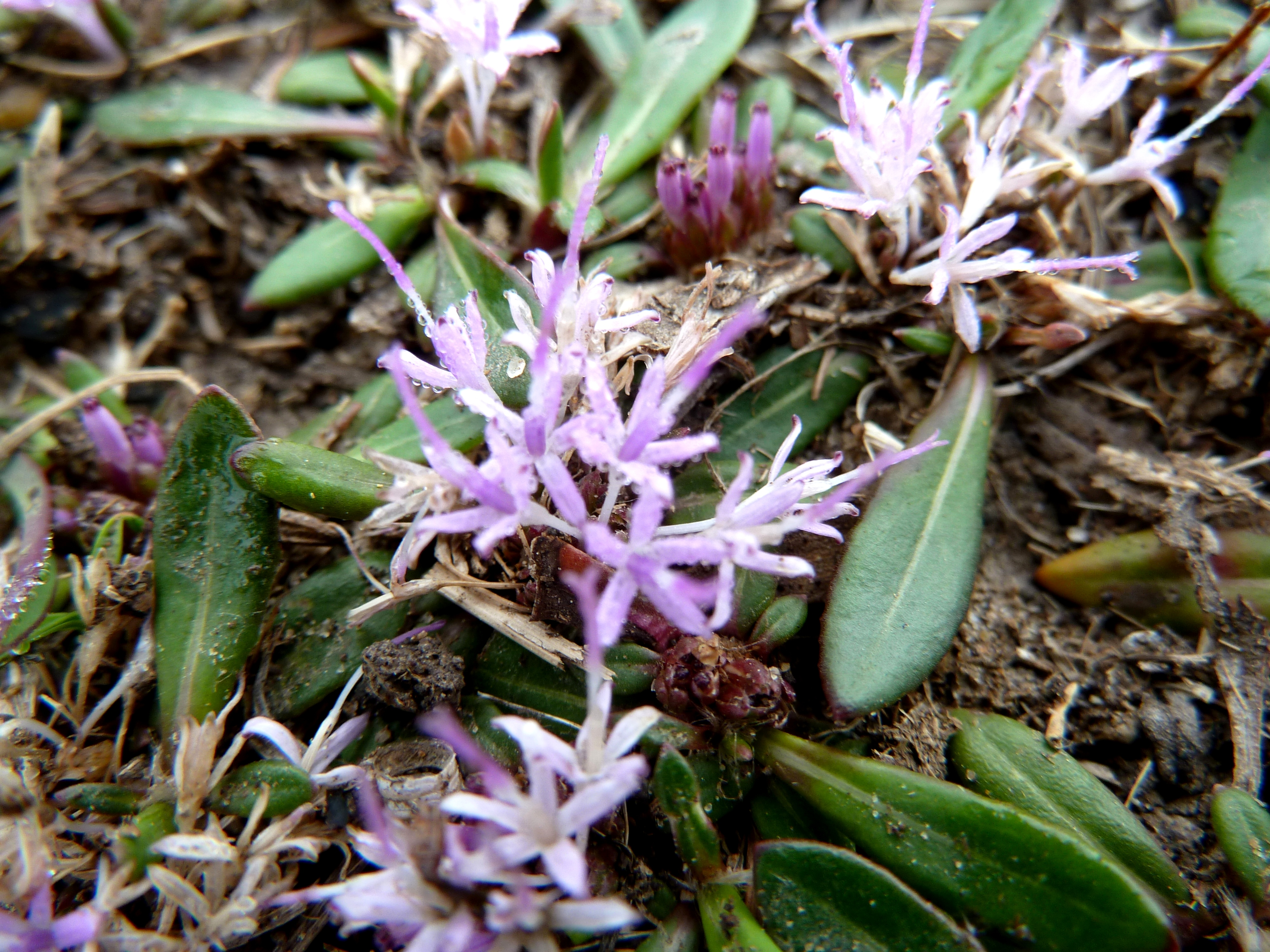
- Platycarphella parvifolia

Scientific classification
- Kingdom: Plantae
- Clade: Tracheophytes
- Clade: Angiosperms
- Clade: Eudicots
- Clade: Asterids
- Order: Asterales
- Family: Asteraceae
- Subfamily: Vernonioideae
- Tribe: Platycarpheae; V.A.Funk & H.Rob. (2009)

Genera
- Platycarpha Less.; Platycarphella V.A.Funk & H.Rob.

= Platycarpheae =

Tribe of flowering plants

Platycarpheae is a tribe of the Asteraceae that is native to Namibia and South Africa. The tribe contains two genera and a total of three species.
