= Platycarphella =

Scientific classification
- Kingdom: Plantae
- Clade: Tracheophytes
- Clade: Angiosperms
- Clade: Eudicots
- Clade: Asterids
- Order: Asterales
- Family: Asteraceae
- Subfamily: Vernonioideae
- Tribe: Platycarpheae
- Genus: Platycarphella; V.A.Funk & H.Rob.

Species
- Platycarphella carlinoides (Oliv. & Hiern) V.A.Funk & H.Rob.; Platycarphella parvifolia (S.Moore) V.A.Funk & H.Rob.

Genus of flowering plants

Platycarphella is a genus of flowering plants in the family Asteraceae. It includes two species native to southern Africa.

- Platycarphella carlinoides (Oliv. & Hiern) V.A.Funk & H.Rob.
- Platycarphella parvifolia (S.Moore) V.A.Funk & H.Rob.
