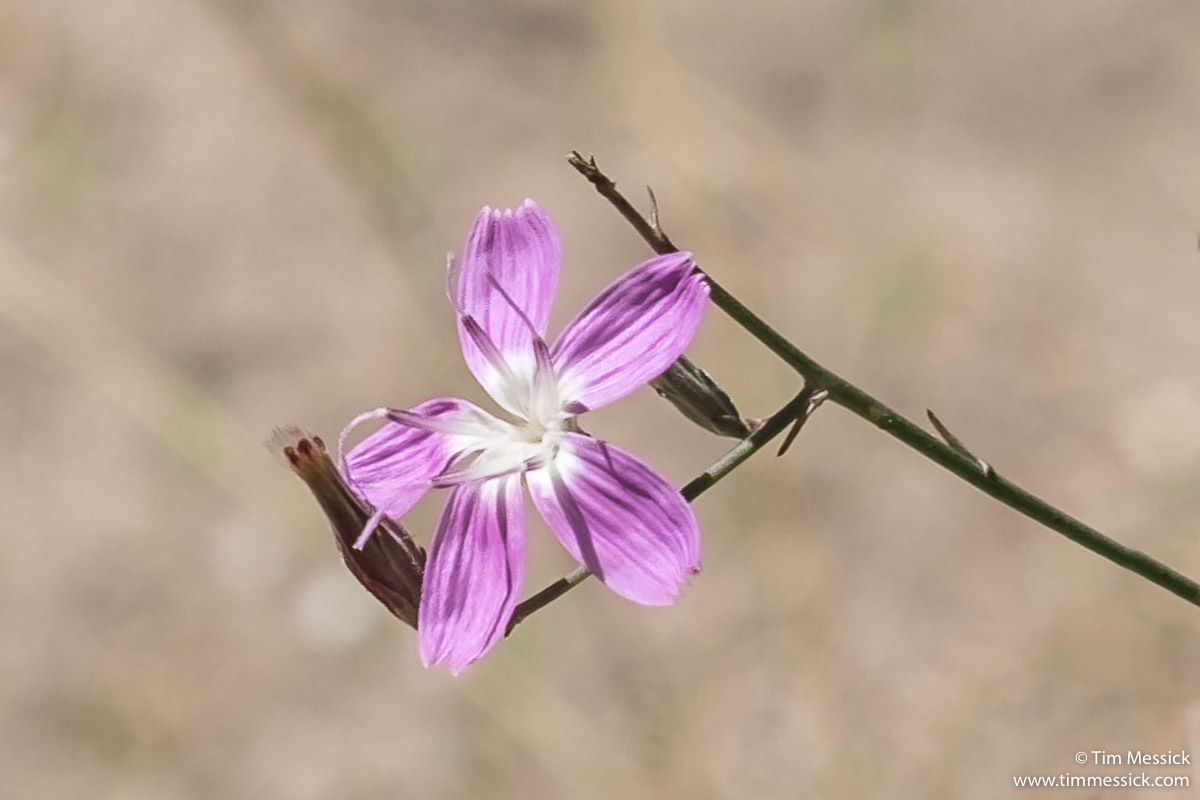

Scientific classification
- Kingdom: Plantae
- Clade: Tracheophytes
- Clade: Angiosperms
- Clade: Eudicots
- Clade: Asterids
- Order: Asterales
- Family: Asteraceae
- Genus: Stephanomeria
- Species: S. paniculata

Binomial name
- Stephanomeria paniculata Nutt.

= Stephanomeria paniculata =

Species of plant

Stephanomeria paniculata is a species of flowering plant in the family Asteraceae known by the common names tufted wirelettuce and stiff-branched wirelettuce. It is native to the northwestern United States, where it grows in many types of habitat, including disturbed areas. It is an annual or biennial herb producing a slender, erect stem with stiff, widely spreading branches toward the top. It is hairless. The leaves are mostly located in a basal rosette, the largest reaching 10 centimeters long. Smaller, linear leaves occur along the upper stem. Flower heads occur singly or in small clusters along the stiff branches. Each head contains 4 to 6 ray florets, each with an elongated tube and a pinkish or lavender ligule up to 1.4 centimeters long. The fruit is an achene tipped with a spreading cluster of long, white pappus bristles.
