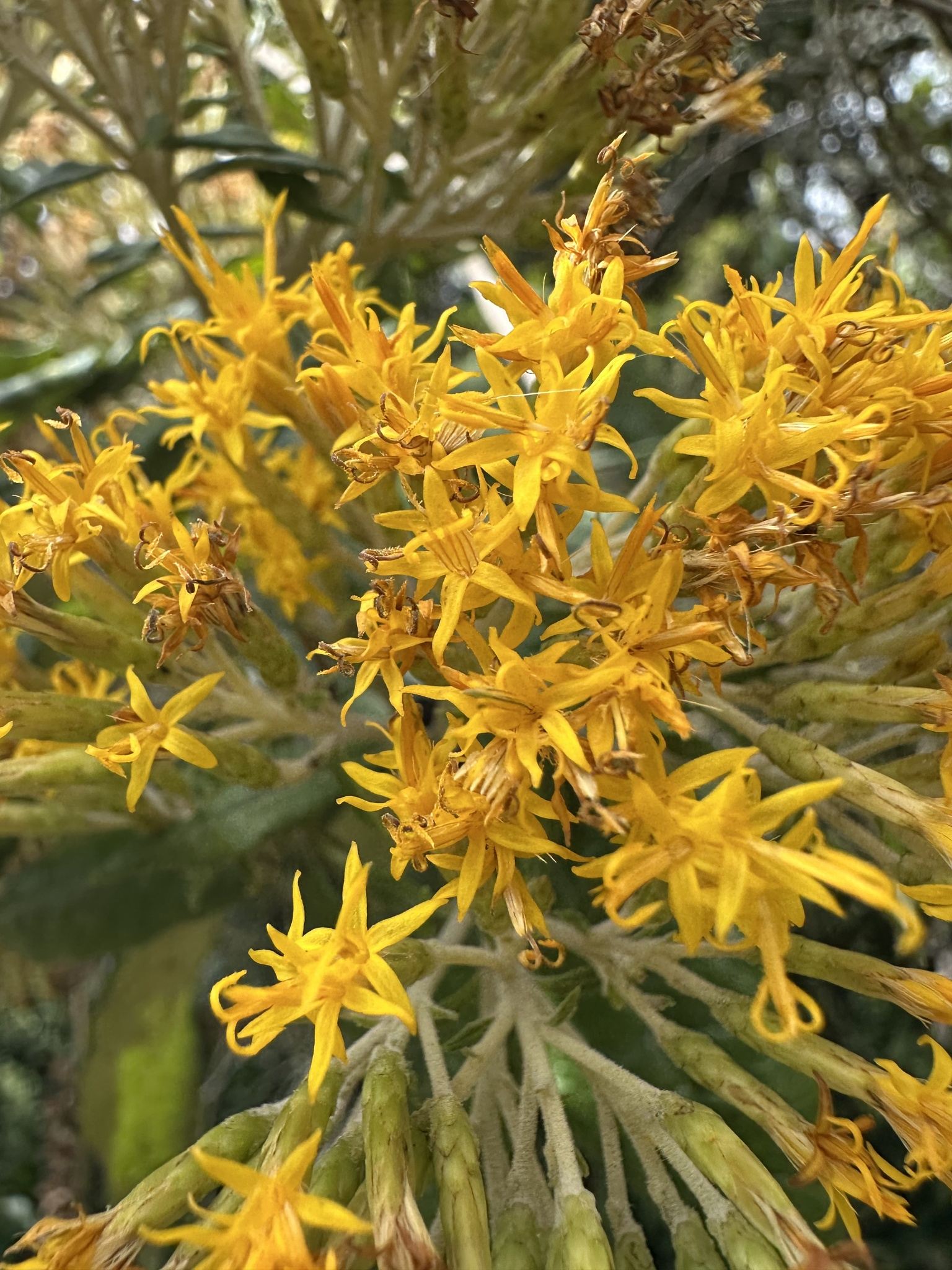
- Llerasia lindenii in Colombia

Scientific classification
- Kingdom: Plantae
- Clade: Embryophytes
- Clade: Tracheophytes
- Clade: Spermatophytes
- Clade: Angiosperms
- Clade: Eudicots
- Clade: Asterids
- Order: Asterales
- Family: Asteraceae
- Subfamily: Asteroideae
- Tribe: Astereae
- Subtribe: Chiliotrichinae
- Genus: Llerasia; Triana

Type species
- Llerasia lindenii Triana

Synonyms
- Neosyris Greene; Bigelowia sect. Diplostephioides (Benth. & Hook.f.) A.Gray; Chrysothamnus sect. Diplostephoides Benth. & Hook.f.

= Llerasia =

Genus of flowering plants

Llerasia is a genus of South American flowering plants in the family Asteraceae.

Species

- Llerasia assuensis (Kunth) Cuatrec.
- Llerasia beckii Cabrera
- Llerasia boliviensis (Cabrera) Cuatrec.
- Llerasia caucana (S.F.Blake) Cuatrec.
- Llerasia fuliginea (Kunth) Cuatrec.
- Llerasia hypoleuca (Turcz.) Cuatrec.
- Llerasia ledifolia (S.F.Blake) Cuatrec.
- Llerasia lindenii Triana
- Llerasia lucidula (S.F.Blake) Cuatrec.
- Llerasia macrocephala (Rusby) Pruski
- Llerasia rufescens (S.F.Blake) Cuatrec.
- Llerasia soratensis (S.F.Blake) Cuatrec.
