= Lupettiana =

Lupettiana Temporal range: Neogene–present

Scientific classification
- Kingdom: Animalia
- Phylum: Arthropoda
- Subphylum: Chelicerata
- Class: Arachnida
- Order: Araneae
- Infraorder: Araneomorphae
- Family: Anyphaenidae
- Genus: Lupettiana; Brescovit, 1997

Type species
- L. linguanea Brescovit, 1997

Species
- 9, see text

Genus of spiders

Lupettiana is a genus of anyphaenid sac spiders first described by Antônio Brescovit in 1997.

== Species ==
As of October 2026 it contains nine species:

- Lupettiana bimini Brescovit, 1999 – Bahama Is.
- Lupettiana eberhardi Brescovit, 1999 – Costa Rica
- Lupettiana levii Brescovit, 1999 – Hispaniola
- Lupettiana linguanea Brescovit, 1997 – Jamaica, Guadeloupe, Dominica
- Lupettiana manauara Brescovit, 1999 – Brazil
- Lupettiana mordax (O. Pickard-Cambridge, 1896) – USA to Peru, Brazil
- Lupettiana parvula (Banks, 1903) – Cuba, Hispaniola
- Lupettiana piedra Brescovit, 1999 – Cuba
- Lupettiana spinosa (Bryant, 1948) – Hispaniola
