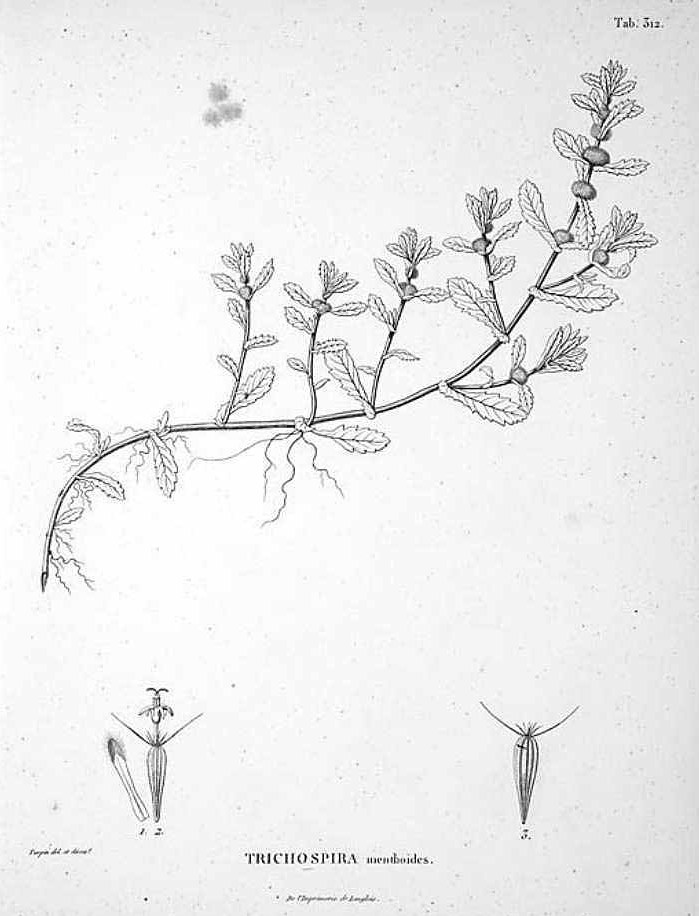

Scientific classification
- Kingdom: Plantae
- Clade: Embryophytes
- Clade: Tracheophytes
- Clade: Angiosperms
- Clade: Eudicots
- Clade: Asterids
- Order: Asterales
- Family: Asteraceae
- Subfamily: Vernonioideae
- Tribe: Vernonieae
- Genus: Trichospira; Kunth in Humboldt et al.
- Species: T. verticillata

Binomial name
- Trichospira verticillata (L.) S.F.Blake

Synonyms
- Bidens verticillata L.; Trichospira biarista Less.; Trichospira pulegium Mart. ex DC.; Salmea verticillata (L.) Druce; Rolandra reptans Willd. ex Less.; Rolandra septans Willd. ex Less.; Trichospira prieurei DC.; Trichospira biaristata Less.; Trichospira menthoides Kunth (type species of Trichospira); Trichospira biaristata DC.

= Trichospira =

Genus of flowering plants

Trichospira is a genus of flowering plants in the tribe Vernonieae within the family Asteraceae.

Species

The only known species is Trichospira verticillata, native to the tropical parts of the Western Hemisphere.
