= Barrosoa =

Scientific classification
- Kingdom: Plantae
- Clade: Embryophytes
- Clade: Tracheophytes
- Clade: Angiosperms
- Clade: Eudicots
- Clade: Asterids
- Order: Asterales
- Family: Asteraceae
- Subfamily: Asteroideae
- Tribe: Eupatorieae
- Genus: Barrosoa; R.M. King & H. Rob.

Synonyms
- Ageratiopsis Sch.Bip. ex Benth. & Hook.f.

Genus of flowering plants

Barrosoa is a genus of flowering plants in the family Asteraceae. All the species are endemic to South America:

- Barrosoa apiculata (Gardner) R.M.King & H.Rob.
- Barrosoa atlantica R.M.King & H.Rob.
- Barrosoa betonicaeformis (DC.) R.M.King & H.Rob.
- Barrosoa betonicifolia R.M.King & H.Rob.
- Barrosoa betoniciformis (DC.) R.M.King & H.Rob.
- Barrosoa cabrerae (B.L.Rob.) R.M.King & H.Rob.
- Barrosoa candolleana (Hook. & Arn.) R.M.King & H.Rob.
- Barrosoa confluentis (B.L.Rob.) R.M.King & H.Rob.
- Barrosoa grossedentata V.M.Badillo
- Barrosoa metensis (B.L.Rob.) R.M.King & H.Rob.
- Barrosoa organensis (Gardner) R.M.King & H.Rob.
- Barrosoa ramboi (Cabrera) R.M.King & H.Rob.
- Barrosoa trianae (B.L.Rob.) R.M.King & H.Rob.
