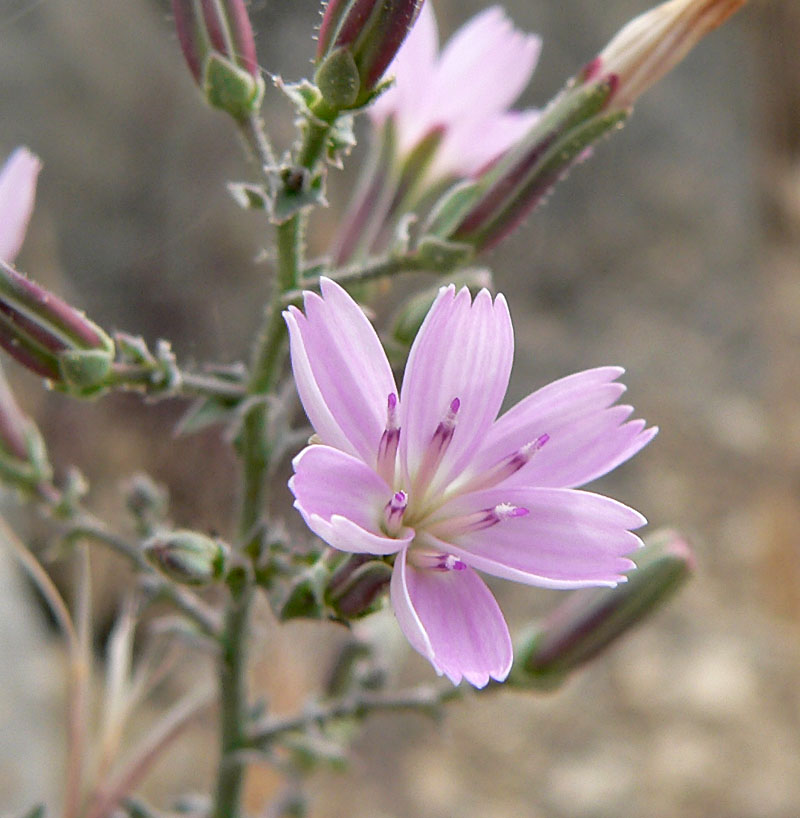
- Stephanomeria exigua subsp. exigua

Conservation status
- Secure (NatureServe)

Scientific classification
- Kingdom: Plantae
- Clade: Tracheophytes
- Clade: Angiosperms
- Clade: Eudicots
- Clade: Asterids
- Order: Asterales
- Family: Asteraceae
- Genus: Stephanomeria
- Species: S. exigua

Binomial name
- Stephanomeria exigua Nutt.

= Stephanomeria exigua =

Species of plant

Stephanomeria exigua, the small wirelettuce, is a perennial or biennial plant native to the western United States. It is thought to be the parent species of Stephanomeria malheurensis (Malheur wirelettuce), an endangered plant species found only in southern Oregon. It generally blooms from mid-spring to late summer and produces small, light pink or light purple blooms.

== Distribution and range ==
Stephanomeria exigua is native to the arid regions of Arizona, California, Colorado, Idaho, New Mexico, Nevada, Oregon, Texas, Utah and Wyoming, as well as New York.

== Related taxa ==
There are 17 related species of Stephanomeria according to the US Department of Agriculture, including S. runcinata, S. cichoriacea, and S. elata. There are also 5 sub-species of S. exigua, S. exigua carotifera, S. exigua coronaria, S. exigua deanei, S. exigua exigua, and S. exigua macrocarpa All are native to the western United States and parts of western Canada, except one that is found in New York state.
