= Pseudostifftia =

Scientific classification
- Kingdom: Plantae
- Clade: Tracheophytes
- Clade: Angiosperms
- Clade: Eudicots
- Clade: Asterids
- Order: Asterales
- Family: Asteraceae
- Subfamily: Vernonioideae
- Tribe: Moquinieae
- Genus: Pseudostifftia; H.Rob.
- Species: P. kingii

Binomial name
- Pseudostifftia kingii H.Rob.

Synonyms
- Moquinia kingii (H.Rob.) Gamerro

Genus of plants

Pseudostifftia is a genus of flowering plants in the tribe Moquinieae within the family Asteraceae.

Species

The only known species is Pseudostifftia kingii, native to eastern Brazil (State of Bahia)
