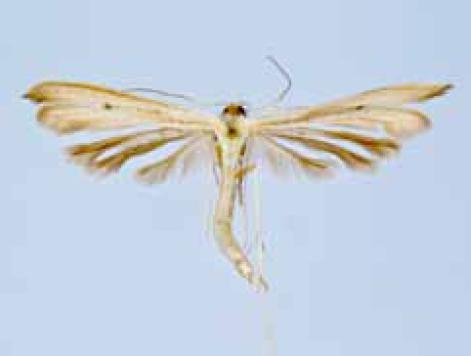

Scientific classification
- Kingdom: Animalia
- Phylum: Arthropoda
- Clade: Pancrustacea
- Class: Insecta
- Order: Lepidoptera
- Family: Pterophoridae
- Genus: Hellinsia
- Species: H. paleaceus

Binomial name
- Hellinsia paleaceus (Zeller, 1873)

Synonyms
- Leioptilus paleaceus Zeller, 1873; Oidaematophorus paleaceus; Leioptilus sericidactylus Murtfeldt, 1880

= Hellinsia paleaceus =

Species of plume moth

Hellinsia paleaceus is a moth of the family Pterophoridae described by Philipp Christoph Zeller in 1873. It is found in North America, including Florida, Mississippi Maryland, Montana, Texas, California, Nebraska, New Mexico and south-eastern Canada. It has also been recorded from Puerto Rico.

The wingspan is 19–26 millimetres (0.75–1.02 in). Adults have been recorded from March to September.

The larvae feed on Vernonia gigantea, Vernonia missurica, Vernonia noveboracensis, Vernonia angustifolia, Vernonia blodgettii and Vernonia cinerea (Cyanthillium cinereum).
