= Tall ironweed =

Tall ironweed is a common name for several plants and may refer to:

- Vernonia angustifolia, native to the southeastern United States
- Vernonia gigantea, native to eastern North America
