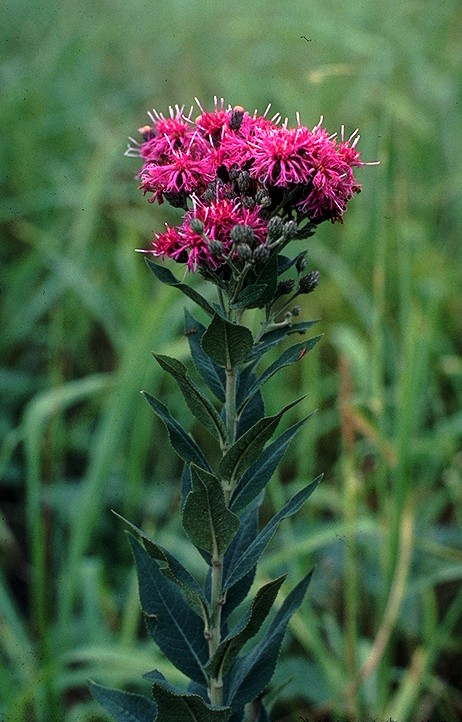
- Vernonia baldwinii

Scientific classification
- Kingdom: Plantae
- Clade: Tracheophytes
- Clade: Angiosperms
- Clade: Eudicots
- Clade: Asterids
- Order: Asterales
- Family: Asteraceae
- Subfamily: Vernonioideae
- Tribe: Vernonieae
- Genus: Vernonia; Schreb.

Species
- See list of Vernonia species

Synonyms
- List: Achyrocoma Cass.; Alkibias Raf.; Aostea Buscal. & Muschl.; Cacalia Burm. ex Kuntze; Centrapalus Cass.; Seneciodes L. ex T.Post & Kuntze; Tecmarsis DC.

= Vernonia =

Genus of flowering plants

Vernonia is a genus of about 350 species of forbs and shrubs in the family Asteraceae. Some species of this genus are known as ironweeds. Some species are edible and of economic value. They are known for having intense purple flowers. There have been numerous distinct subgenera and subsections named in this genus, and some botanists have divided the genus into several distinct genera. For instance, the Flora of North America recognizes only about twenty species in Vernonia sensu stricto, seventeen of which are in North America north of Mexico, with the others being found in South America.

== Taxonomy ==
The genus was circumscribed by Johann Christian Daniel von Schreber in Gen. Pl. ed. 8[a]. vol.2 on page 541 in 1791.

The genus name of Vernonia is in honour of William Vernon (1666/67 – c. 1711), who was an English plant collector, (bryologist) and entomologist from Cambridge University, who collected in Maryland, USA in 1698.

== Species ==
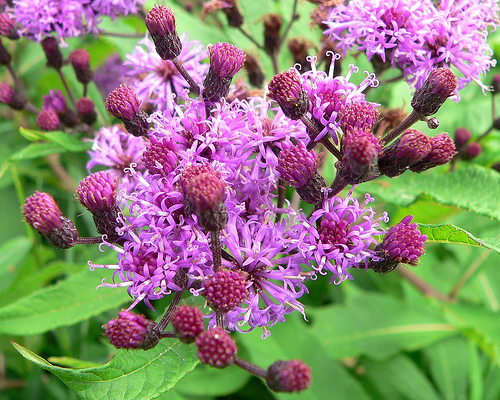
Vernonia altissima

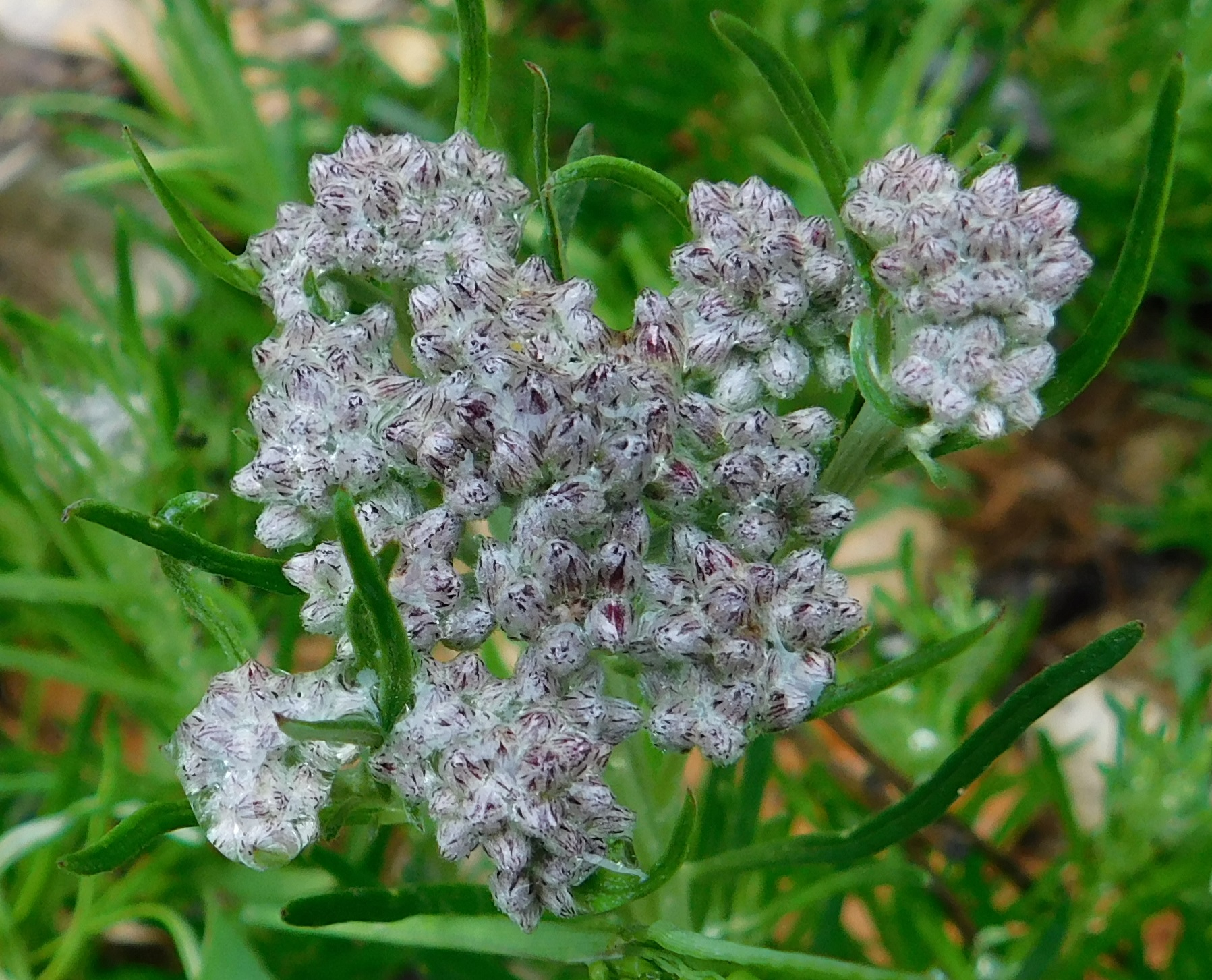
Vernonia capensis

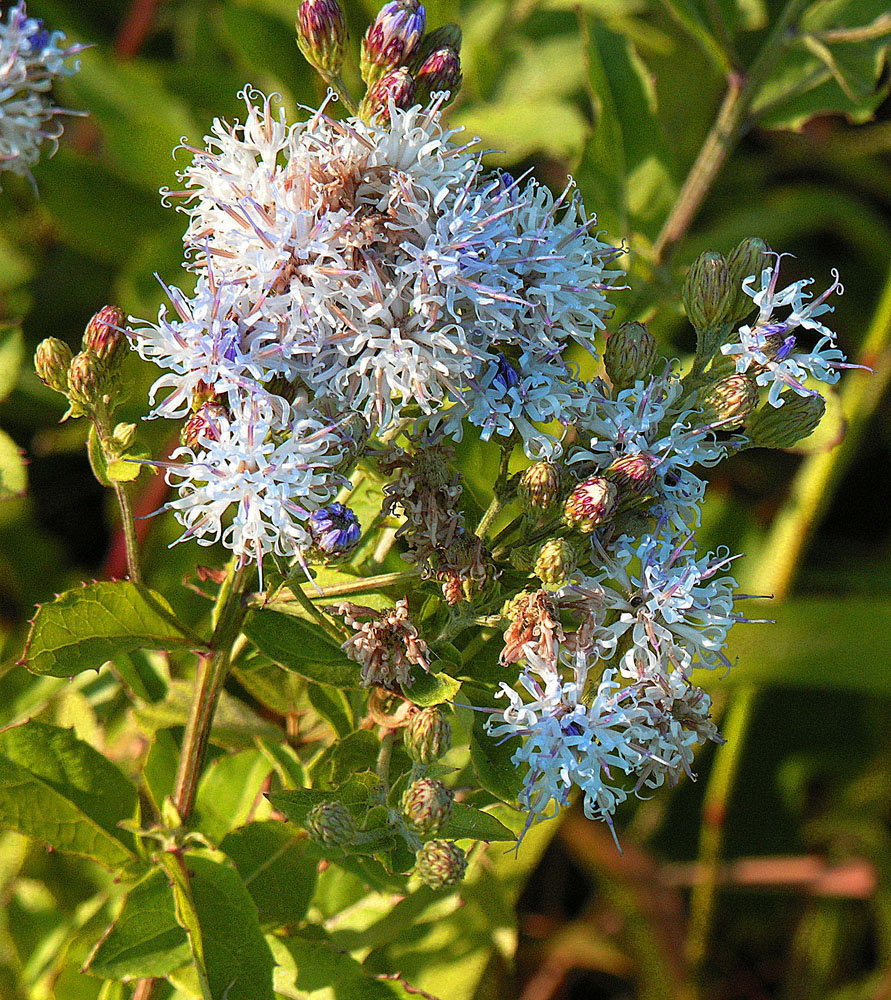
Vernonia galamensis

Species of this genus are found in South America, Africa, Southeast Asia, and North America. Vernonia species are well known for hybridizing between similar species in areas of overlapping ranges. There are approximately 350 species in the genus. A selected list is given below.

=== North America ===
- Vernonia acaulis
- Vernonia arkansana
- Vernonia angustifolia
- Vernonia baldwinii
- Vernonia blodgettii
- Vernonia fasciculata
- Vernonia flaccidifolia
- Vernonia gigantea or Vernonia altissima
- Vernonia glauca
- Vernonia larseniae
- Vernonia lettermannii
- Vernonia lindheimeri
- Vernonia marginata
- Vernonia missurica
- Vernonia noveboracensis
- Vernonia proctorii
- Vernonia pulchella
- Vernonia texana

=== Africa ===
- Vernonia amygdalina
- Vernonia calvoana
- Vernonia colorata
- Vernonia galamensis
- Vernonia kotschyana
- Vernonia staehelinoides
- Vernonia cineria
- vernonia myriantha

=== Asia ===
- Vernonia andersoni
- Vernonia arborea
- Vernonia cockburniana
- Vernonia elaeagnifolia
- Vernonia unicata
- Vernonia zollingerianoides

== Uses ==
=== Food, medicine and oilseed ===
Several species of Vernonia, including V. calvoana, V. amygdalina, and V. colorata, are eaten as leaf vegetables. Common names for these species include bitterleaf, onugbu in the Igbo language, ewuro and ndole. They are common in most West African and Central African countries. They are one of the most widely consumed leaf vegetables of Nigeria, where the onugbu soup is a local delicacy of the Igbo people, and of Cameroon, where they are a key ingredient of Ndolé: the national dish of Cameroon. The leaves have a sweet and bitter taste. They are sold fresh or dried and are a typical ingredient in egusi soup.

Vernonia amygdalina is used in traditional herbal medicine. These leaves are exported from several African countries and can be purchased in grocery stores aiming to serve African clients. In Brazil, V. condensata is commonly known as "figatil" or "necroton" and used in local traditional medicine.

Vernonia galamensis is used as an oilseed in East Africa. It is grown in many parts of Ethiopia, especially around the city of Harar, with an average seed yield of 2 to 2.5 t/ha. It is reported that the Ethiopian strains of Vernonia have the highest oil content, up to 41.9% with up to 80% vernolic acid, and is used in paint formulations, coatings plasticizers, and as a reagent for many industrial chemicals.

=== Horticulture ===
Vernonia are grown as ornamental plants in gardens, particularly some of the larger herbaceous North American species which are favoured for prairie-style plantings. The most widely grown are V. angustifolia, V. arkansana (syn. V. crinita), V. baldwinii, V. fasciculata, V. gigantea (syn. V. altissima), V. lettermannii, V. missurica and V. noveboracensis.

A few cultivars have been selected, mostly on the basis of greater size and robustness (e.g. V. angustifolia 'Plum Peachy', V. gigantea 'Jonesboro Giant') or white flower colour (e.g. V. arkansana 'Alba', V. noveboracensis 'Albiflora', V. noveboracensis 'White Lightning').

== Ecology ==
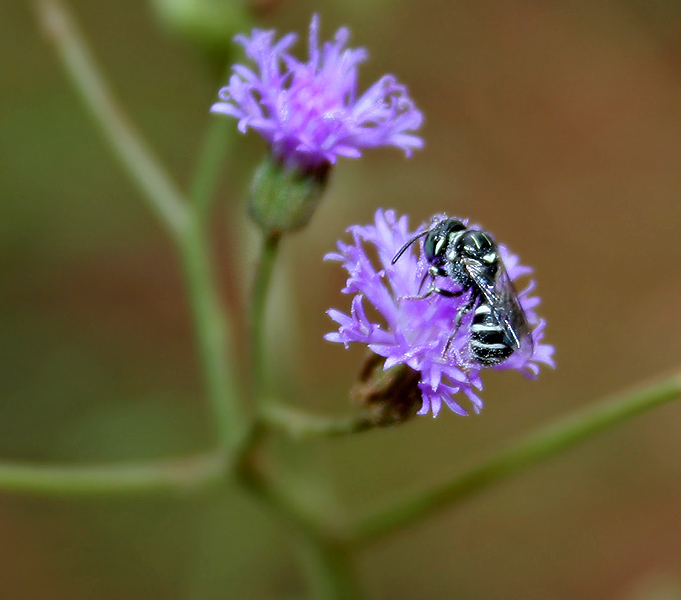
Ceratina bee on Vernonia cinerea at Ananthagiri Hills, in Ranga Reddy district of Andhra Pradesh, India

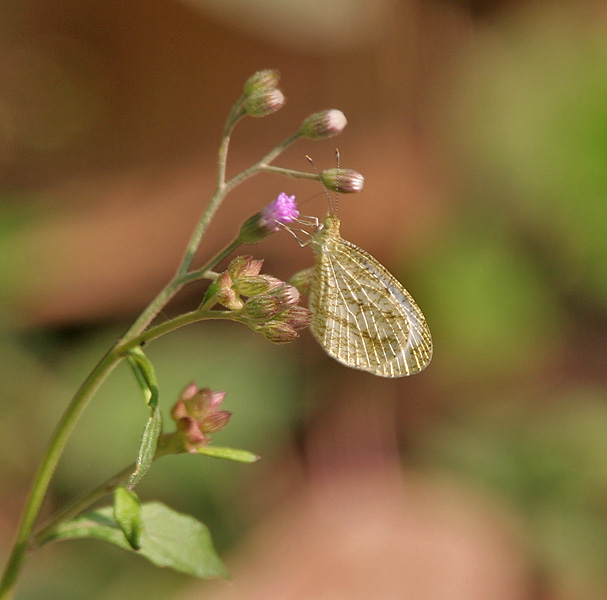
Psyche (Leptosia nina) on an ash fleabane or little ironweed (Vernonia cinerea) in Kolkata, West Bengal, India.

Vernonia species are used as food plants by the larvae of some Lepidoptera species including Coleophora vernoniaeella (which feeds exclusively on the genus) and Schinia regia (which feeds exclusively on V. texana). Vernonia is a very diverse genus, varying from the tiny V. desertorum of the Caatinga region of Brazil which is only 8 cm (3.1 in) tall to Vernonia arborea of the East Indies which, at 36 m (118 ft) is the tallest of all composites; a 472 fold difference in height. The liana Vernonia andersoni of Burma, according to Menninger, "climbs into the tops of trees" and could be even taller. The leaves can vary from quite small up to 1.2 m (3 ft 11 in) long by up to 38 cm (15 in) in width in the case of Vernonia conferta of Cameroon.
