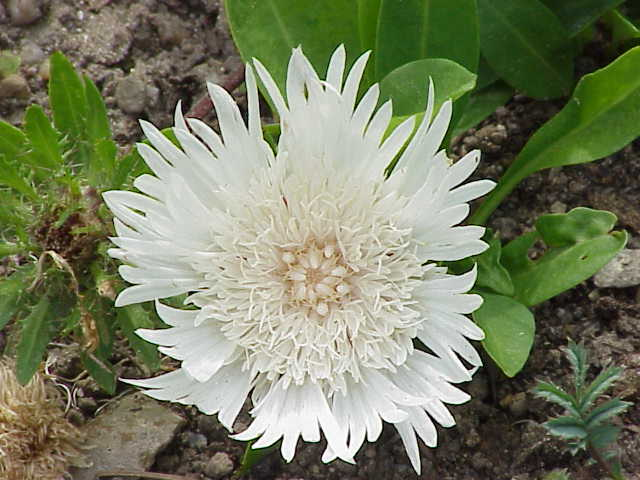

Conservation status
- Apparently Secure (NatureServe)

Scientific classification
- Kingdom: Plantae
- Clade: Tracheophytes
- Clade: Angiosperms
- Clade: Eudicots
- Clade: Asterids
- Order: Asterales
- Family: Asteraceae
- Subfamily: Vernonioideae
- Tribe: Vernonieae
- Genus: Stokesia; L'Hér.
- Species: S. laevis

Binomial name
- Stokesia laevis (Hill) Greene

Synonyms
- Carthamus laevis

= Stokesia laevis =

Species of plant

Stokesia is a monotypic genus of flowering plants in the daisy family, Asteraceae, containing the single species Stokesia laevis. Common names include Stokes' aster and stokesia. The species is native to the southeastern United States.

The flowers appear in the summer and are purple, blue, or white in the wild. The plant is cultivated as a garden flower. Several cultivars are available, including the cornflower blue 'Klaus Jelitto', 'Colorwheel', which is white, turning purple over time, and 'Blue Danube', which has a blue flower head with a white center. More unusual cultivars include the pink-flowered 'Rosea' and yellow-flowered 'Mary Gregory'.

Like a few other plants (such as some species of Vernonia), it contains vernolic acid, a vegetable oil with commercial applications.

The genus is named after Jonathan Stokes (1755–1831), English botanist and physician.
