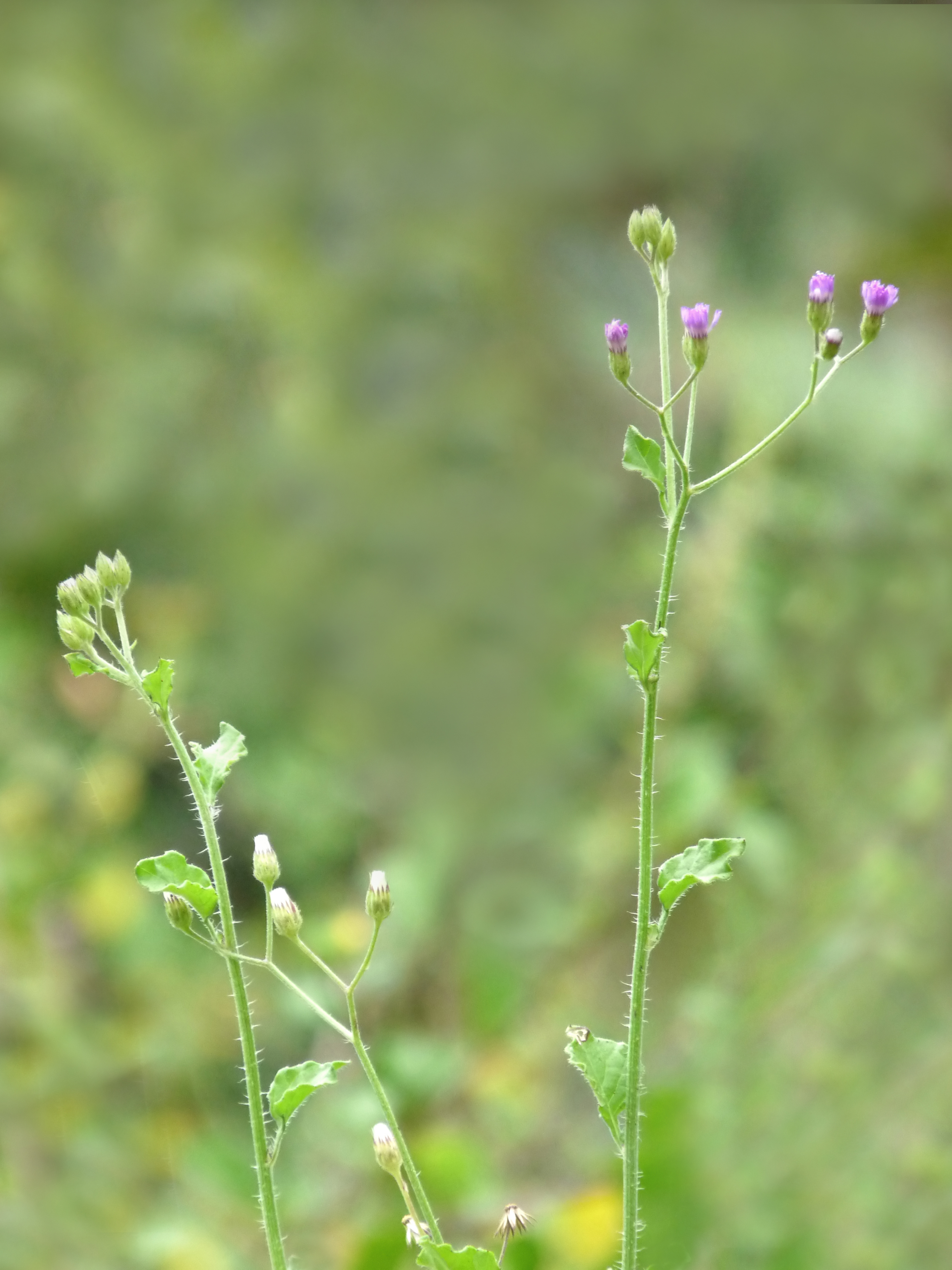
- Cyanthillium cinereum

Scientific classification
- Kingdom: Plantae
- Clade: Tracheophytes
- Clade: Angiosperms
- Clade: Eudicots
- Clade: Asterids
- Order: Asterales
- Family: Asteraceae
- Subfamily: Vernonioideae
- Tribe: Vernonieae
- Genus: Cyanthillium; Blume 1826

Type species
- Cyanthillium villosum Blume (synonym of Cyanthillium patulum)

Synonyms
- Claotrachelus Zoll.; Cyanopis Blume 1828, illegitimate homonym not Cass. 1817; Isomeria D.Don ex DC.; Isonema Cass. 1817, illegitimate homonym not R.Br. 1810; Triplotaxis Hutch.; Vernonia subsect. Olivestus S.B.Jones; Vernonia sect. Tephrodes DC.; Vernonia subsect. Tephrodes (DC.) S.B.Jones

= Cyanthillium =

Genus of flowering plants

Cyanthillium is a genus of tropical plants in the tribe Vernonieae within the family Asteraceae. It includes 12 species native to tropical and subtropical Africa, Asia, Australia, and the Pacific.

== Species ==
12 species are accepted.

- Cyanthillium albicans (DC.) H.Rob. - southwestern India
- Cyanthillium cinereum (L.) H.Rob. - tropical Asia + tropical Africa; naturalized in tropical Americas including Florida
- Cyanthillium gracilis (Lander & P.J.H.Hurter) K.R.Thiele & E.E.Schill.
- Cyanthillium conyzoides (DC.) H.Rob. - southwestern India
- Cyanthillium hookerianum (Arn.) H.Rob. - Sri Lanka
- Cyanthillium maritimum (Merr.) H.Rob. & Skvarla – Philippines and Taiwan
- Cyanthillium patulum (Dryand. ex Dryand.) H.Rob. - tropical Asia, Madagascar
- Cyanthillium polytrichomata (Wech.) H.Rob. – Tanzania and Zambia
- Cyanthillium stelluliferum (Benth.) H.Rob. - tropical Africa
- Cyanthillium vernonioides (Muschl.) H.Rob. - central Africa
- Cyanthillium wollastonii (S.Moore) H.Rob., Skvarla & V.A.Funk - East Africa
