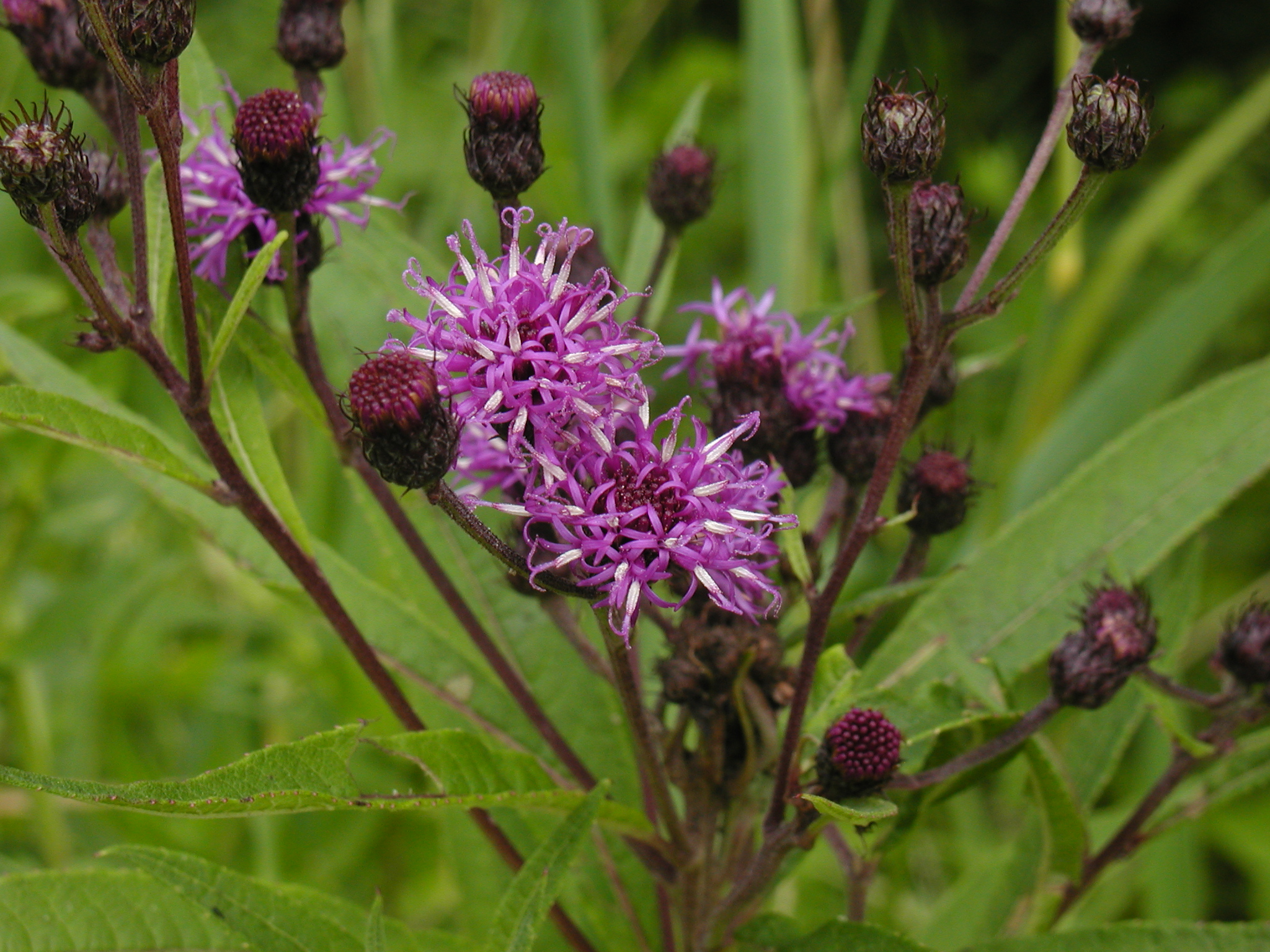
- Closeup of flowers

Conservation status
- Secure (NatureServe)

Scientific classification
- Kingdom: Plantae
- Clade: Tracheophytes
- Clade: Angiosperms
- Clade: Eudicots
- Clade: Asterids
- Order: Asterales
- Family: Asteraceae
- Genus: Vernonia
- Species: V. noveboracensis

Binomial name
- Vernonia noveboracensis (L.) Michx.
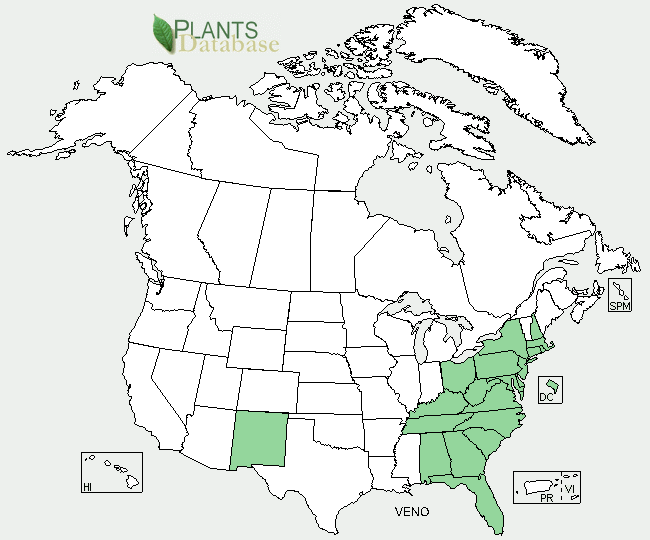
- Natural range in North America

Synonyms
- Behen noveboracense (L.) Hill; Behen praealtum Hill; Cacalia noveboracensis (L.) Kuntze; Chrysocoma noveboracensis Desf.; Chrysocoma tomentosa Walter; Serratula caroliniana Mill.; Serratula noveboracensis L.; Serratula praealta L.; Vernonia harperi Gleason; Vernonia noveboracensis f. albiflora Britton; Vernonia noveboracensis f. lilacina Oswald; Vernonia noveboracensis var. praealta Alph.Wood; Vernonia noveboracensis var. tomentosa Britton; Vernonia rugeliana Shuttlew. ex A.Gray; Vernonia tomentosa Elliott

= Vernonia noveboracensis =

Species of plant

Vernonia noveboracensis, the New York ironweed or vein-leaf hawkweed, is a plant in the family Asteraceae. It is native to the eastern United States, from Florida to Massachusetts and west to Tennessee, Alabama, and West Virginia and to southern Ontario.

== Description ==
Vernonia noveboracensis is a herbaceous plant with alternate, simple leaves on stiff, greenish-purple stems. It grows about 6 ft (1.8 m) tall. The flowers are purple, borne in summer and fall. Ironweed is an herbaceous clumping perennial that will spread by seed. Ironweed can be an aggressive in moist soils. Vernonia noveboracensis has longer stems than other plants in the same genus like Vernonia acaulis. The color of the seed is brown. It grows with multiple stems and at a moderate rate. It is a deciduous plant. The main flower of this plant is made up of florets, which are small and compact. V. noveboracensis has a small fruit called an achene covered in bristles that allows it to be dispersed by the wind. V. noveboracensis needs 2-5 years to reach its maximum height. It can grow in chalk, clay, and loam soils with acid to alkaline pH levels.

== Ecology ==
Vernonia noveboracensis blooms in August and grows in wetlands and moist soils. It is classified as FAC+ (wetland indicator status). Its active growth period is during the summer. The lowest temperature at which it can survive is −33 °F (−36 °C). Vernonia noveboracensis competes through its early season growth and tall stem height. A hard stem also allows the plant to withstand windy conditions. V. noveboracensis is not known to be an invasive species, nor is it toxic. This plant attracts butterflies, birds, and other insects, but it is resistant to deer.

== Uses ==
Dihydromikanolide is a sesquiterpene lactone found in V. noveboracensis, which is used to treat infections. Native Americans use its leaves to make a tea (tisane) that relieves labor pain and is used as a blood tonic. The roots of the plants were also made into teas that relieved stomach ulcers and tooth pain.
