= Coronaric acid =

Names
- IUPAC name 8-[3-[(Z)-Oct-2-enyl]oxiran-2-yl]octanoic acid
- Other names 9,10-Epoxy-12Z-octadecenoic acid; 9(10)-EpOME, 9R,10S-EpOME and 9S,10R-EpOME

Identifiers
CAS Number	16833-56-0 racemate
3D model (JSmol)	9R,10S ((+)-coronaric acid): Interactive image; 9S,10R ((−)-coronaric acid): Interactive image
ChEBI	CHEBI:86022 9R,10S; CHEBI:34494 racemate
ChEMBL	ChEMBL1903868 racemate
ChemSpider	4861048 racemate
PubChem CID	5316080 9R,10S; 6246154 racemate
UNII	7U94YS1WZ0 racemate
CompTox Dashboard (EPA)	DTXSID80274343
- InChI: InChI=1S/C18H32O3/c1-2-3-4-5-7-10-13-16-17(21-16)14-11-8-6-9-12-15-18(19)20/h7,10,16-17H,2-6,8-9,11-15H2,1H3,(H,19,20)/b10-7-/t16-,17+/m0/s1 Key: FBUKMFOXMZRGRB-SQGUUQMOSA-N; InChI=1S/C18H32O3/c1-2-3-4-5-7-10-13-16-17(21-16)14-11-8-6-9-12-15-18(19)20/h7,10,16-17H,2-6,8-9,11-15H2,1H3,(H,19,20)/b10-7- Key: FBUKMFOXMZRGRB-YFHOEESVSA-N
- SMILES: 9R,10S ((+)-coronaric acid): CCCCC\C=C/CC1[C@H](O1)CCCCCCCC(O)=O; 9S,10R ((−)-coronaric acid): CCCCC\C=C/CC1O[C@H]1CCCCCCCC(O)=O

Properties
Chemical formula	C_{18}H_{32}O_{3}
Molar mass	296.451 g·mol^{−1}
- Except where otherwise noted, data are given for materials in their standard state (at 25 °C [77 °F], 100 kPa). Infobox references

Coronaric acid (leukotoxin or leukotoxin A) is a mono-unsaturated, epoxide derivative of the di-unsaturated fatty acid, linoleic acid (i.e. 9(Z),12(Z) octadecadienoic acid). It is a mixture of the two optically active isomers of 12(Z) 9,10-epoxy-octadecenoic acid. This mixture is also termed 9,10-epoxy-12Z-octadecenoic acid or 9(10)-EpOME (for Epoxy-Octadeca-MonoEnoic acid) and when formed by or studied in mammalians, leukotoxin.

== Occurrence ==
Coronaric acid is found in the seed oils derived from plants in the sunflower family, such as Helianthus annuus and Xeranthemum annuum.

Coronaric acid is also formed by the cells and tissues of various mammalian (including human) species through the metabolism of linoleic acid by cytochrome P450 (CYP) epoxygenase enzymes. These CYPs (CYP2C9 and probably other CYPs that metabolize polyunsaturated fatty acids to epoxides) metabolize linoleic acid to 9S,10R-epoxy-12(Z)-octadecenoic acid and 9R,10S-epoxy-12(Z)-octadecenoic acid, i.e. the (+) and (-) epoxy optical isomers of coronaric acid. When studied in this context, the optical isomer mixture is often termed leukotoxin. These same CYP epoxygenases concurrently attack linoleic acid at the carbon 12,13 rather than 9,10 double bond of linoleic acid to form a mixture of (+) and (-) epoxy optical isomers viz., 12S,13R-epoxy-9(Z)-octadecenoic and 12R,13S-epoxy-9(Z)-octadecenoic acids. This (+) and (-) optical mixture is often termed vernolic acid when studied in plants and isoleukotoxin when studied in mammals.

Coronaric acid is found in urine samples from healthy human subjects and increases 3- to 4-fold when these subjects are treated with a salt-loading diet.

Coronaric and vernolic acids also form non-enzymatically when linoleic acid is exposed to oxygen and/or UV radiation as a result of the spontaneous process of autoxidation. This autoxidation complicates studies in that it is often difficult to determine if these epoxy fatty acids identified in linoleic acid-rich plant and mammalian tissues represent actual tissue contents or are artifacts formed during their isolation and detection.

== Metabolism ==
In mammalian tissue, coronaric acid is metabolized to its two corresponding dihydroxy stereoisomers, 9S,10R-dihydroxy-12(Z)-octadecenoic and 9R,10S-dihydroxy-12(Z)-octadecenoic acids, by soluble epoxide hydrolase within minutes of its formation. The metabolism of coronaric acid to these two products, collectively termed leukotoxin diols, appears to be critical to coronaric acid's toxicity, i.e. the diols are the toxic metabolites of the non-toxic or far less toxic coronaric acid.

== Activities ==
=== Toxicities ===
At very high concentrations, the linoleic acid-derived set of optical isomers, coronaric acid (i.e. leukotoxin) possesses toxicity similar to that of other structurally unrelated leukotoxins. It is toxic to leukocytes and other cell types, and when injected into rodents produces multiple organ failure and respiratory distress. These effects appear to be due to its conversion to its dihydroxy counterparts, 9S,10R- and 9R,10S-dihydroxy-12(Z)-octadecenoic acids by soluble epoxide hydrolase. Some studies suggest, but have not yet proven, that isoleukotoxin, acting primarily if not exclusively through its dihydroxy counterparts, is responsible for or contributes to multiple organ failure, the acute respiratory distress syndrome, and certain other cataclysmic diseases in humans (see Epoxygenase § Linoleic acid). Vernolic acid (i.e. isoleukotoxin) shares a similar metabolic fate in being converted by soluble epoxide hydrolase to its dihydroxide counterparts, resulting in the toxic actions of those counterparts.

=== Other activities ===
At lower concentrations, isoleukotoxin and its dihydroxy counterparts can protect from the toxic actions cited above that occur at higher concentrations of isoleukotoxin and leukotoxin; they may also share with the epoxides of arachidonic acid, i.e. the epoxyeicosatreienoates (see Epoxyeicosatrienoic acids), anti-hypertension activities.
