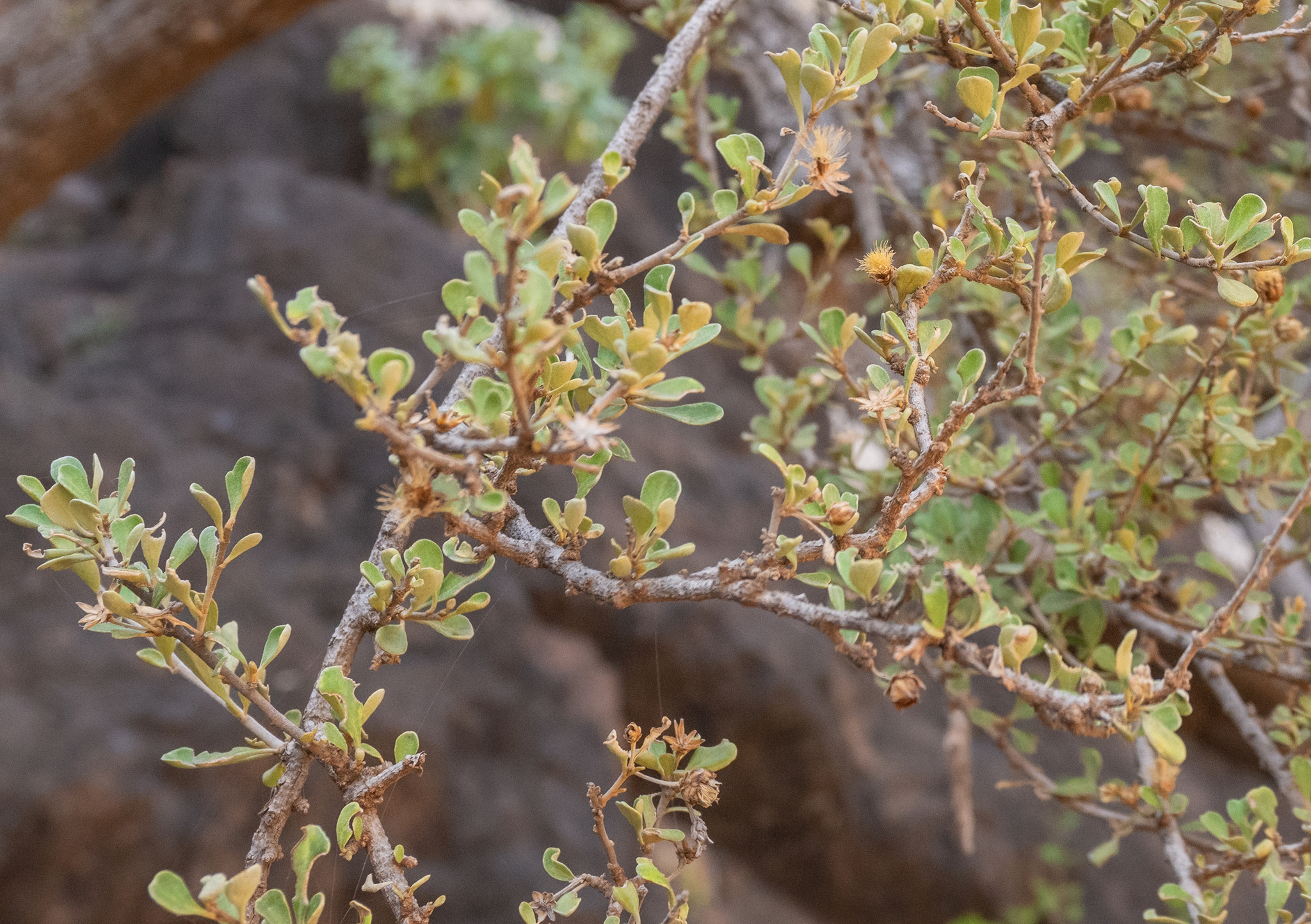

Conservation status
- Vulnerable (IUCN 3.1)

Scientific classification
- Kingdom: Plantae
- Clade: Tracheophytes
- Clade: Angiosperms
- Clade: Eudicots
- Clade: Asterids
- Order: Asterales
- Family: Asteraceae
- Genus: Vernonia
- Species: V. unicata

Binomial name
- Vernonia unicata C.Jeffrey

= Vernonia unicata =

Species of flowering plant

Vernonia unicata is a species of flowering plant in the family Asteraceae that is endemic to the island of Socotra in Yemen. Its natural habitat is subtropical or tropical dry forests.
