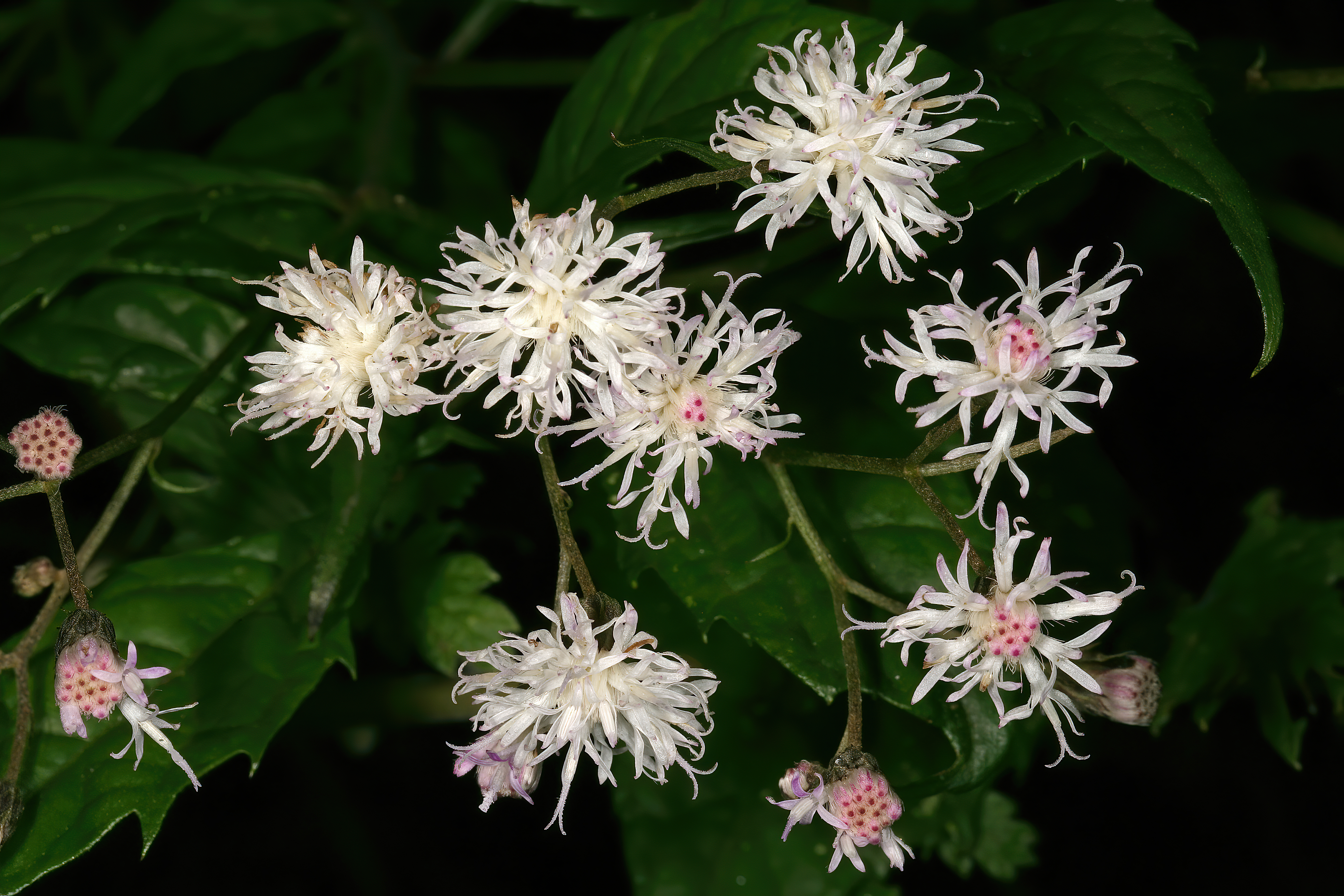

Scientific classification
- Kingdom: Plantae
- Clade: Tracheophytes
- Clade: Angiosperms
- Clade: Eudicots
- Clade: Asterids
- Order: Asterales
- Family: Asteraceae
- Genus: Cyanthillium
- Species: C. wollastonii

Binomial name
- Cyanthillium wollastonii H.Rob., Skvarla & V.A.Funk

Synonyms
- Vernonia transvaalensis Hutch.; Vernonia umbratica Oberm.; Vernonia heterocarpa Chiov.; Vernonia gracilipes S. Moore; Vernonia wollastonii S. Moore

= Cyanthillium wollastonii =

Species of flowering plant

Cyanthillium wollastonii is a species of plant in the family Asteraceae. It is native to eastern and southeastern Africa, ranging from Sudan and Ethiopia to the Northern Provinces and KwaZulu-Natal in South Africa. It is a delicate shrub that can grow up to 3 meters tall while stems are 5m tall.
