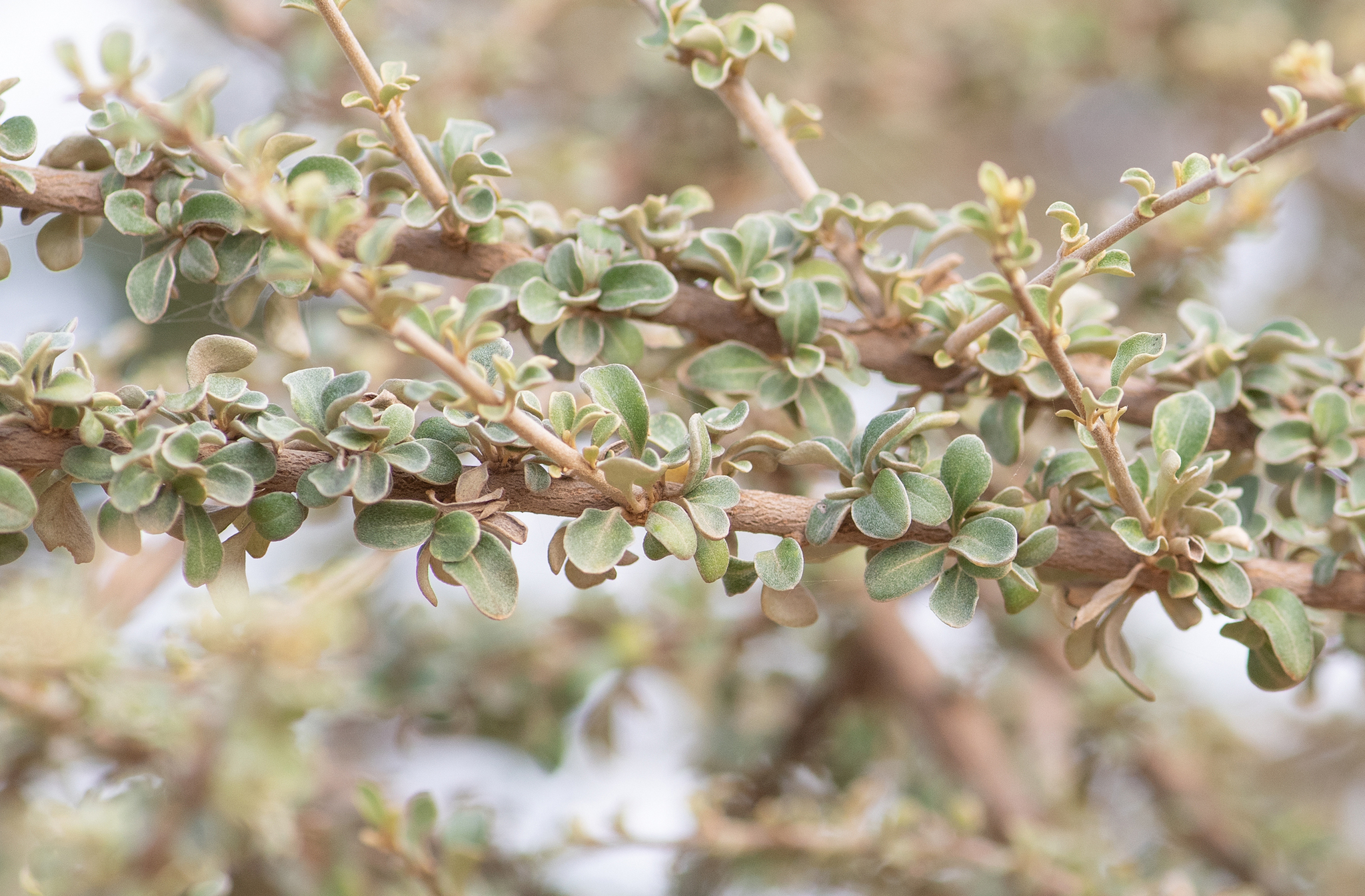

Conservation status
- Least Concern (IUCN 3.1)

Scientific classification
- Kingdom: Plantae
- Clade: Tracheophytes
- Clade: Angiosperms
- Clade: Eudicots
- Clade: Asterids
- Order: Asterales
- Family: Asteraceae
- Genus: Vernonia
- Species: V. cockburniana

Binomial name
- Vernonia cockburniana Balf.f.

= Vernonia cockburniana =

Species of plant

Vernonia cockburniana is a species of flowering plant in the Asteraceae family. It is endemic to the island of Socotra in Yemen. Its natural habitats are subtropical or tropical dry forests and subtropical or tropical dry shrubland.
