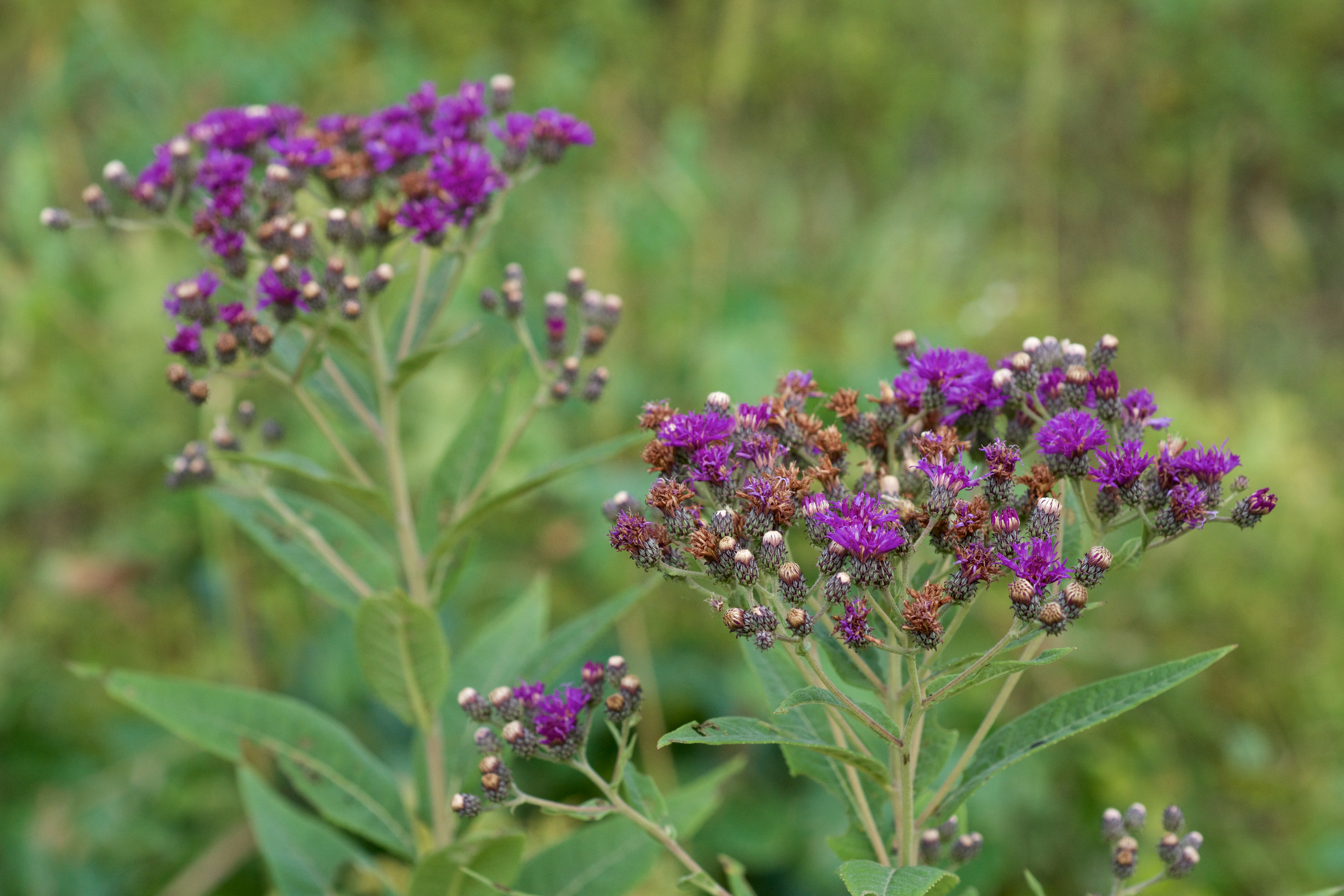
- Vernonia baldwinii inflorescence

Conservation status
- Secure (NatureServe)

Scientific classification
- Kingdom: Plantae
- Clade: Embryophytes
- Clade: Tracheophytes
- Clade: Spermatophytes
- Clade: Angiosperms
- Clade: Eudicots
- Clade: Asterids
- Order: Asterales
- Family: Asteraceae
- Genus: Vernonia
- Species: V. baldwinii

Binomial name
- Vernonia baldwinii Torr.

= Vernonia baldwinii =

Species of flowering plant

Vernonia baldwinii, commonly known as western ironweed or Baldwin's ironweed, is a perennial herb native to the central United States. It is in the Asteraceae (aster) family.

== Description ==
Vernonia baldwinii is a tall, perennial herb with rhizomes. Its stems are densely tomentose, branched, round in cross section, and range up to 1.2 m (3 ft 11 in) in height, sometimes taller. Its leaves are lanceolate, cauline and alternate, and are about 15 cm (5.9 in) in length and 4.5 cm (1.8 in) in width. The larger leaves have serrated edges. The upper surface of the leaves is minutely hairy, and the lower surface has longer, often bent or tangled hairs.

The inflorescence is showy and somewhat flat-topped, consisting of irregularly branched terminal panicles, and measures 30 cm (1 ft) or more across. Flowerheads have 17 to 34 disk flowers only, with no ray flowers. The corollas on the disk flowers are deep pink to purple, 5-lobed, glabrous, and 0.3–0.4 in (8–10 mm) long.

== Taxonomy ==
The genus Vernonia is named for the English botanist William Vernon, and the species baldwinii is named for William Baldwin, the American botanist and physician who collected the plant.

The common name "western ironweed" is derived from the range of the plant, the western United States, and derived from the toughness of the stem and roots of the plant.

== Distribution and habitat ==
It grows in dry soil in prairies, pastures, open grounds, and woods, ranging from Iowa to Missouri, Nebraska, Kansas, and Texas.

== Ecology ==
The flowers bloom in the summer, from May to September, attracting bees, butterflies, and other insects. American goldfinches and other birds eat the seeds.
