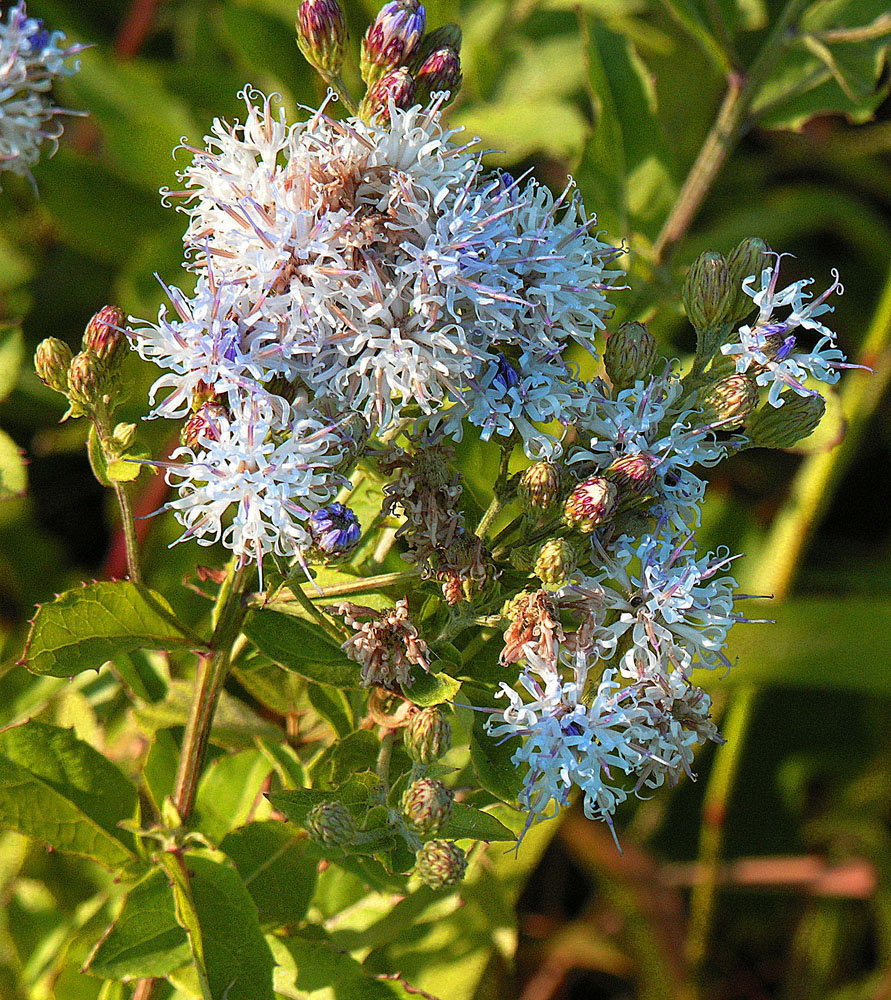

Scientific classification
- Kingdom: Plantae
- Clade: Tracheophytes
- Clade: Angiosperms
- Clade: Eudicots
- Clade: Asterids
- Order: Asterales
- Family: Asteraceae
- Genus: Vernonia
- Species: V. galamensis

Binomial name
- Vernonia galamensis (Cass.) Less.

= Vernonia galamensis =

Species of flowering plant

Vernonia galamensis is a plant in the sunflower family, known for its use as an oilseed. This species, often called ironweed, is the largest source of vernonia oil, which is rich in a useful epoxy fatty acid called vernolic acid and is used to make plastics, rubbery coatings, and drying agents. Use of this oil as a replacement for traditional plasticizers and binders in the production of paints and PVC shows promise as a method of reducing smog pollution.

One of over 1,000 species in genus Vernonia, V. galamensis is native to East Africa. It is grown in the region as an industrial oilseed. Its seed production is poor when it is grown outside of the equatorial region, so cultivation in other places is not always economically worthwhile; however, further studies in the breeding of this species to generate more productive varieties may show promise. It requires loose, porous soil and long periods of dry conditions.

It is grown in many parts of Ethiopia, especially around the city of Harar, with an average seed yield of 2 to 2.5 t/ha. It is reported that the Ethiopian strains of Vernonia have the highest oil content, up to 41.9% with up to 80% vernolic acid, and is used in paint formulations, coatings plasticizers, and as a reagent for many industrial chemicals.

Vernonia galamensis is a daisylike annual which is quite variable in appearance between individual plants. It produces a flower which may be blue or purple, with long petals surrounding a center made up of shorter petals called florets. The center is filled with seeds, some of which may have a hairy tuft called a pappus. Depending on environmental conditions the plant may be squat and shrubby or extremely tall. It may send out few stems, each with one flower, or many stems with bunches of flowers.

When not found in cultivation, the plant may be found growing wild, often as a weed which invades disturbed areas and rangeland. A number of insects feed on the plant. Species of the moth genus Indent are sometimes known as vernonia worms due to their preference for Vernonia plants as food.

There are several subspecies:

- Vernonia galamensis galamensis
- Vernonia galamensis nairobensis
- Vernonia galamensis lushotoensis
- Vernonia galamensis mutomoensis
- Vernonia galamensis afromontana
- Vernonia galamensis gibbosa
