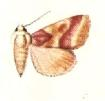

Scientific classification
- Domain: Eukaryota
- Kingdom: Animalia
- Phylum: Arthropoda
- Class: Insecta
- Order: Lepidoptera
- Superfamily: Noctuoidea
- Family: Noctuidae
- Genus: Schinia
- Species: S. regia

Binomial name
- Schinia regia Strecker, 1876

Synonyms
- Heliothis regia (Strecker, 1876); Porrima regia

= Schinia regia =

Species of moth

Schinia regia is a moth of the family Noctuidae. It is found in North America, including Colorado, Kansas, Nebraska, Oklahoma, New Mexico and Texas.

The wingspan is 25–30 mm. Adults are on wing from September to October.

The larvae feed on Vernonia texana.
