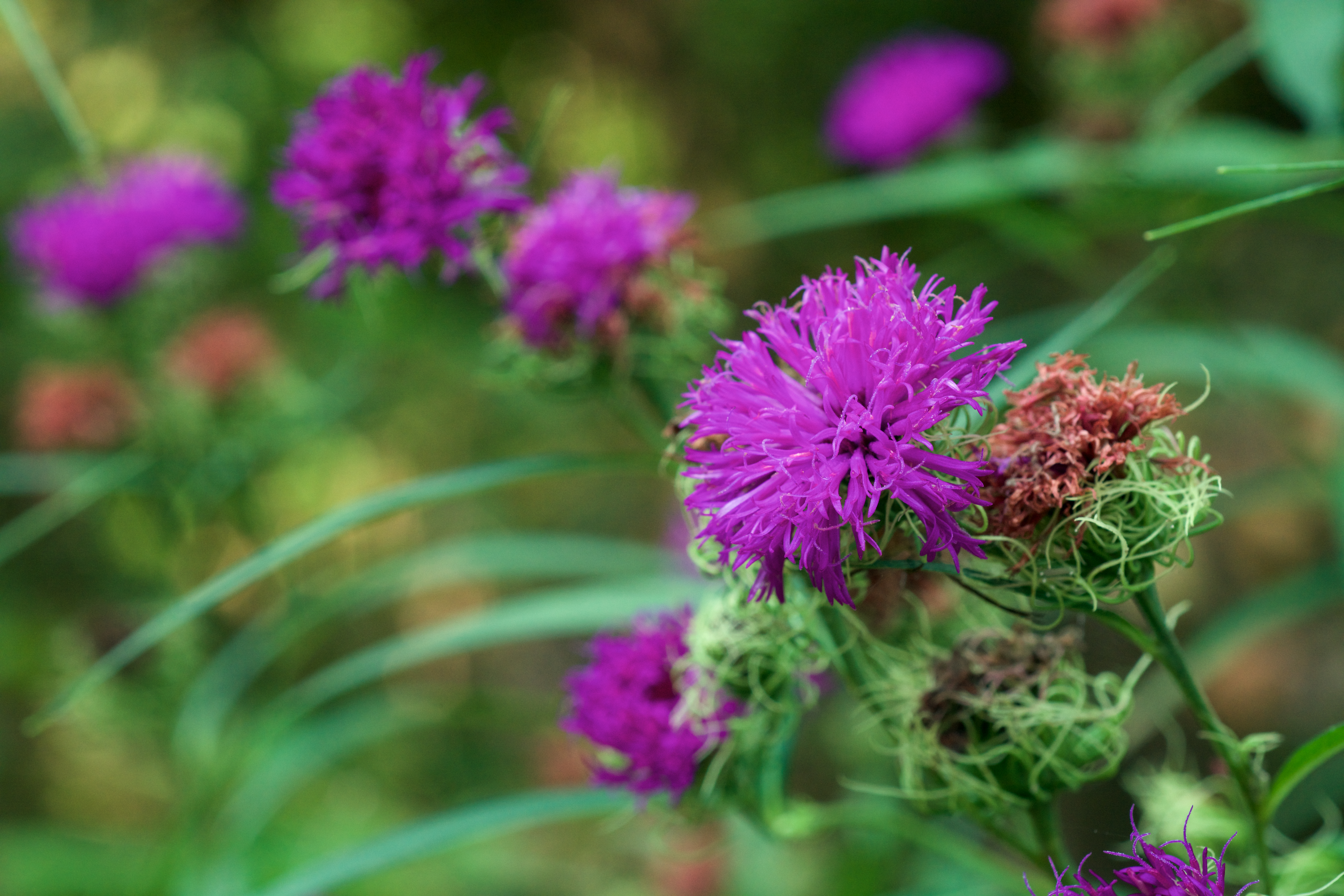

Scientific classification
- Kingdom: Plantae
- Clade: Tracheophytes
- Clade: Angiosperms
- Clade: Eudicots
- Clade: Asterids
- Order: Asterales
- Family: Asteraceae
- Genus: Vernonia
- Species: V. arkansana

Binomial name
- Vernonia arkansana DC.

= Vernonia arkansana =

Species of flowering plant

Vernonia arkansana (also known as Arkansas ironweed and great ironweed) is a species of perennial plant from family Asteraceae found in south-central United States. The plant is 4–6 feet (1.2–1.8 m) high and 3–4 feet (0.91–1.22 m) wide. The flowers bloom from August to September and are pink-purple coloured. The cultivar 'Mammuth' is a recipient of the Royal Horticultural Society's Award of Garden Merit.

== Ecology ==
The plant is pollinated by various insects such as bees, butterflies, and skippers. The same fauna representatives also collect nectar. Bees like Melissodes vernoniae are frequent visitors to Vernonia plants in general. Another special guest the species attracts is Aphis vernoniae, an aphid that prefers to suck on juice of the species. Various caterpillars of moths also enjoy the feeding. Birds on the other hand, don't feed on it, due to hard seeds, and small amount of pollen left (for hummingbirds). Herbevorian mammals also avoid the plant due to the bitterness of its foliage.
