= Jonathan Stokes =

- Born: c. 1755; Chesterfield, Derbyshire, England
- Died: 30 April 1831; Chesterfield, Derbyshire, England
- Resting place: St Mary's, Chesterfield
- Education: University of Edinburgh
- Known for: Early adopter of digitalis, contributions to botany
- Scientific career
- Fields: Medicine, Botany
- Workplaces: Stourbridge, Chesterfield
- Thesis: (1782)

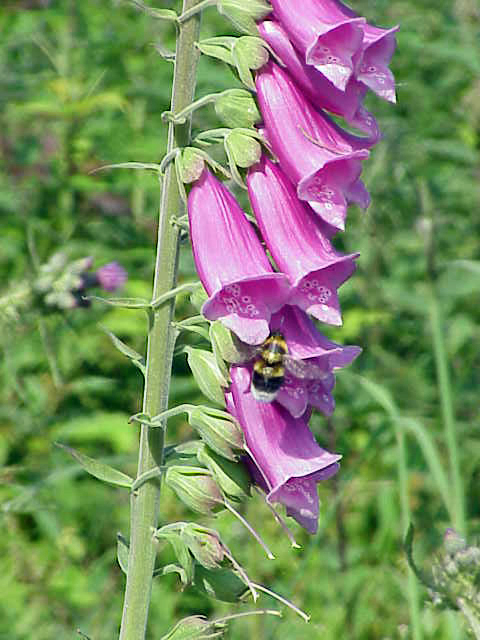
Digitalis purpurea (Common Foxglove)

Jonathan Stokes (c. 1755 – 30 April 1831) was an English physician and botanist, a member of the Lunar Society of Birmingham, and an early adopter of the heart drug digitalis.

== Life and work ==
Stokes was probably born in Chesterfield, Derbyshire, around 1755 and studied medicine at the University of Edinburgh in 1778, qualifying as MD in 1782. He practised medicine in Stourbridge, Worcestershire, and also pursued interests in botany as a plant collector and cataloguer.

Stokes became associated with William Withering (1741–1799), physician and botanist, who was a member of the influential Lunar Society. Stokes had dedicated his thesis on oxygen to Withering and became a member with him of the Lunar Society from 1783 to 1788.

Stokes contributed to Withering's An Account of the Foxglove and its Medical Uses (1785), writing a preface on the history of digitalis and providing details of six clinical trials on patients he had treated for heart failure using Withering's pioneer method. He helped to disseminate medical knowledge of digitalis, lecturing to the Medical Society of Edinburgh on 20 February 1799. He was elected a Foreign Honorary Member of the American Academy of Arts and Sciences in 1788.

In 1790 Stokes was elected as one of the inaugural 16 associates of the newly founded Linnean Society of London and corresponded with Carolus Linnaeus the Younger. He spent the rest of his life in private medical practice in Chesterfield and pursued many scientific interests, publishing A Botanical Materia Medica: Consisting of the Generic and Specific Characters of the Plants Used in Medicine and Diet, with Synonyms, and References to Medical Authors (1812) and Botanical Commentaries (1830).

He died in Chesterfield on 30 April 1831 and was buried at St Mary's, Chesterfield. The plant Stokesia cyanea or Stokesia laevis (Asteraceae/Compositae) is named after him.

== Dispute with Withering ==
Stokes collaborated with Withering on all editions up to the third volume of the second edition (1792) of Withering's standard botanical text, The Botanical Arrangement of All the Vegetables Naturally Growing in Great Britain. Withering and Stokes disagreed with the level of contribution that Stokes's had made to the new edition. Most records state that Withering fell out with Stokes and Erasmus Darwin. While it is true there were disagreements with both, the disputes were roughly contemporaneous. Stokes disagreed with Withering and then failed to agree with the appointed arbitrator, a personal friend and known only by reputation to Withering.

Similarly, Withering did not "fall out" with Erasmus Darwin. Erasmus Darwin tried in an underhand way to claim precedence in identifying the medical use of Digitalis. He failed and could not tolerate Withering's success and so set out to deliberately destroy Withering's reputation. A letter from Darwin to Dr. Johnstone in Birmingham dated 1788 exists seeking such evidence and trying to accuse Withering of Quackery – the worst insult that could be used at that time. The letter is in the Osler Withering bequest at the Royal Society of Medicine in London. Darwin wrote two further similarly toned letters to Matthew Boulton in 1789. They all failed. The reason for the disagreement with Stokes is unclear and is probably down to lack of a formal arrangement between them. Stokes also failed to return around 150 of Withering's books (valuable property then). Withering had to reclaim these through legal action. When returned, all of the books had been damaged by having plates removed. Withering's letter listing the volumes – some were around 100 years old then – is in the Osler Withering bequest at the Royal Society of Medicine in London. Withering was protective of his reputation and having already to deal with the malice of Erasmus Darwin may have become over-defensive as a reaction. Stokes' contributions to Withering's work was significant but it is now impossible to know whether his claim to be considered as a joint/co-author was justified.

== Selected writings ==
- Stokes, Jonathan (1812). A Botanical Materia Medica. London: J. Johnson and Company.
- Stokes, Jonathan (1830). Botanical Commentaries. London: Simpkin and Marshall.
