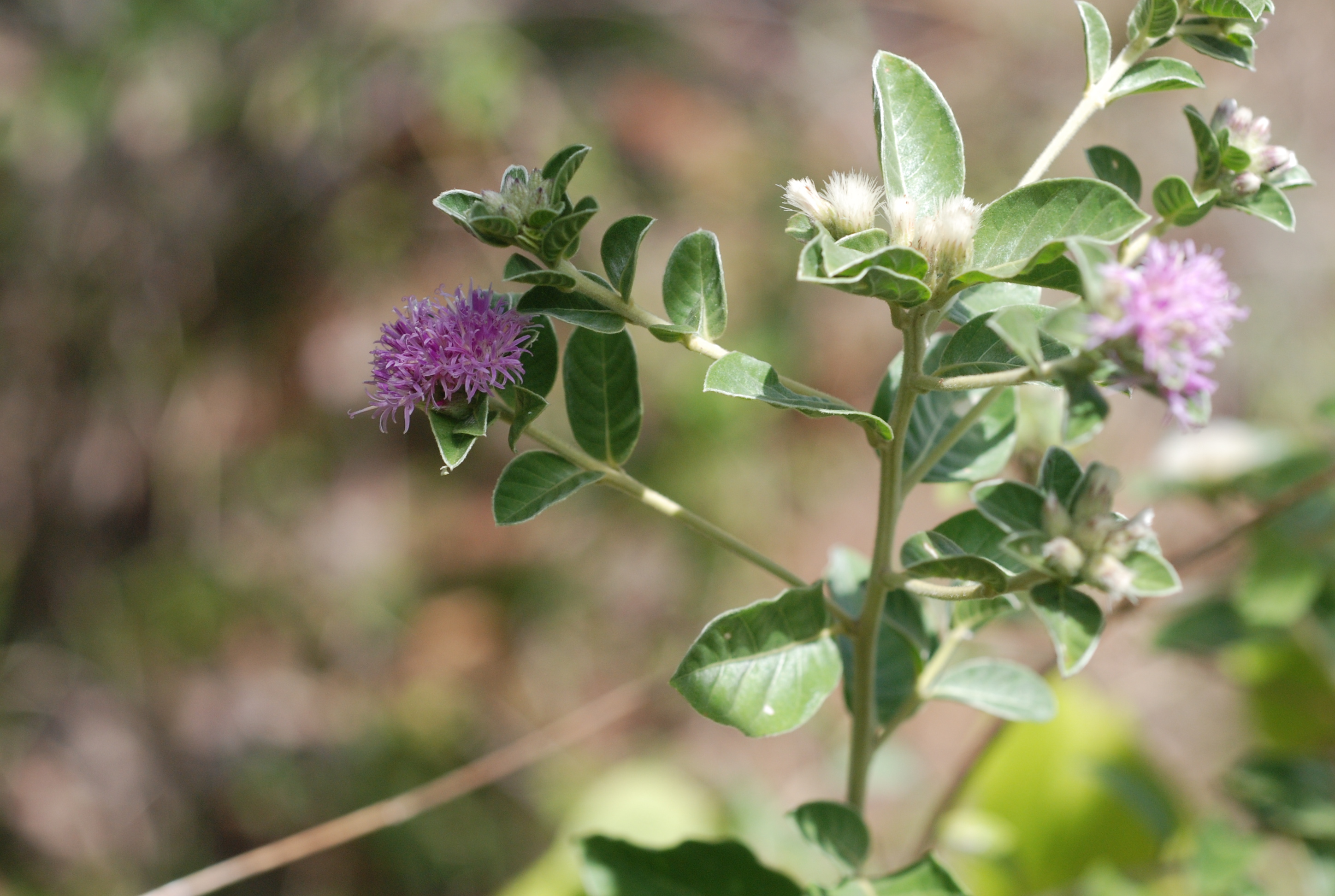

Conservation status
- Endangered (ESA)

Scientific classification
- Kingdom: Plantae
- Clade: Tracheophytes
- Clade: Angiosperms
- Clade: Eudicots
- Clade: Asterids
- Order: Asterales
- Family: Asteraceae
- Genus: Vernonia
- Species: V. proctorii

Binomial name
- Vernonia proctorii Urbatsch

Synonyms
- Lepidaploa proctorii

= Vernonia proctorii =

Species of plant

Vernonia proctorii is a rare species of flowering plant in the aster family known by the common name Proctor's ironweed. It is endemic to Puerto Rico, where there are two populations. It is threatened by the destruction of its habitat. It is a federally listed endangered species of the United States.

This plant was first discovered in 1987 at Cerro Mariquita in the Sierra Bermeja of Puerto Rico. It was described to science as a new species in 1989. It is a shrub growing up to 1.5 meters tall with a stem covered in silvery hairs. The leaves have shiny green blades which are oval in shape and measure up to 3.5 centimeters long by 2.6 wide. The inflorescence is a cluster of 2 to 5 flower heads containing small purple flowers.

The single wild population has 150 individuals as of the year 2008. Another population was started in 2009 when 36 cultivated individuals were planted in the Cabo Rojo National Wildlife Refuge. Both populations are healthy and the United States Fish and Wildlife Service considers the plant's outlook to be improving. It is still threatened because the population at the type locality is on privately owned land that may be used for grazing or cleared for development.
