= Coleophora vernoniaeella =

Scientific classification
- Kingdom: Animalia
- Phylum: Arthropoda
- Clade: Pancrustacea
- Class: Insecta
- Order: Lepidoptera
- Family: Coleophoridae
- Genus: Coleophora
- Species: C. vernoniaeella

Binomial name
- Coleophora vernoniaeella Chambers, 1878

Species of moth

Coleophora vernoniaeella is a moth belonging to the family Coleophoridae. It is found in the United States, with confirmed records in states such as Kentucky and Missouri.

The larvae feed on the leaves of Vernonia and Helianthus species. They construct an annulate case.
