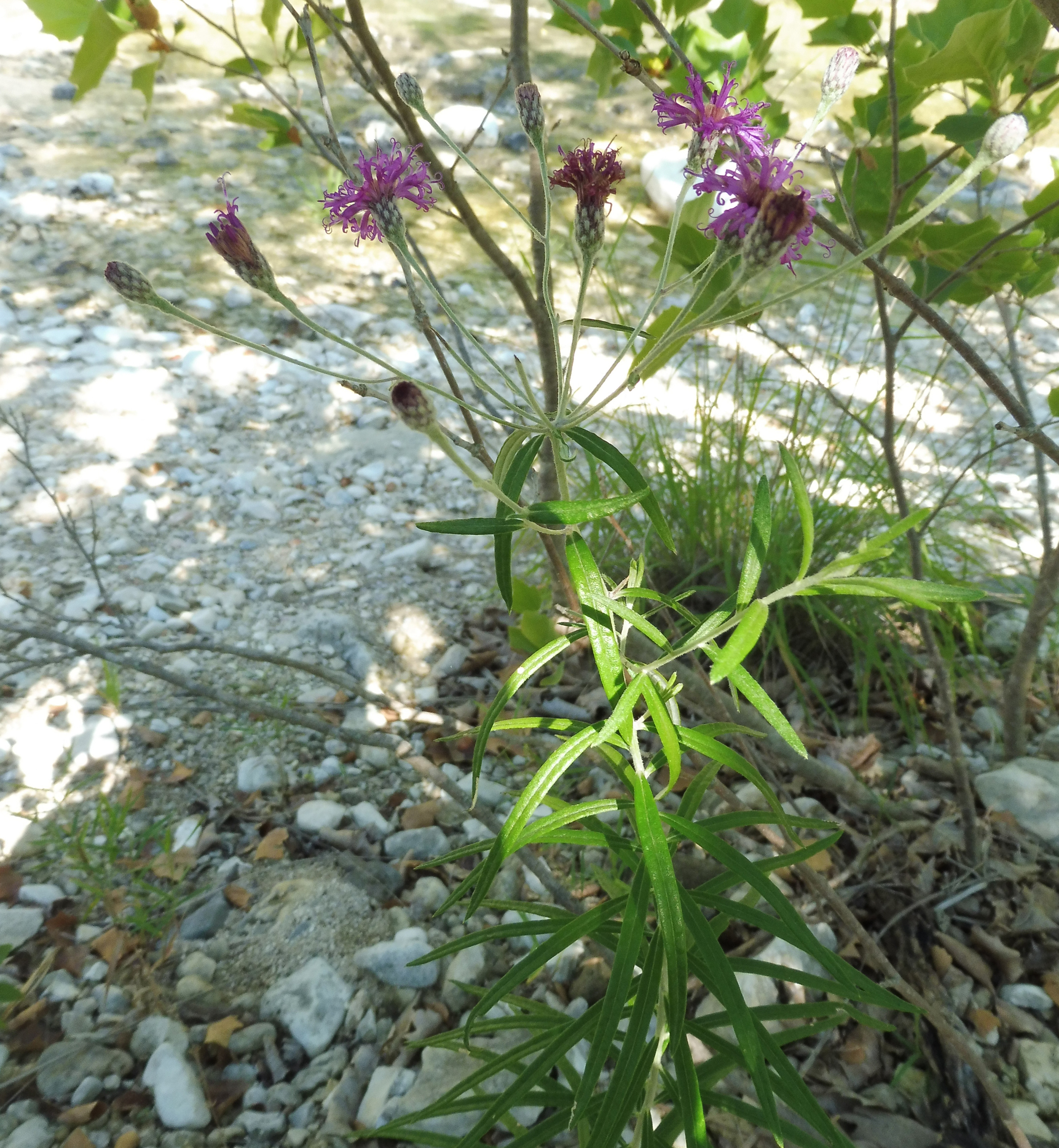

Scientific classification
- Kingdom: Plantae
- Clade: Tracheophytes
- Clade: Angiosperms
- Clade: Eudicots
- Clade: Asterids
- Order: Asterales
- Family: Asteraceae
- Genus: Vernonia
- Species: V. lindheimeri

Binomial name
- Vernonia lindheimeri A.Gray & Engelm.

= Vernonia lindheimeri =

Species of flowering plant

Vernonia lindheimeri, commonly known as woolly ironweed, is a species of flowering plant in the aster family (Asteraceae). It is native North America, where it is native to the state of Coahuila in Mexico and to the state of Texas in the United States. Its natural habitat is in open, calcareous areas.

Vernonia lindheimeri is a robust perennial, growing to 3 feet high. It has narrow linear leaves, which are white-woolly beneath. It produces purple heads of flowers in the summer.
