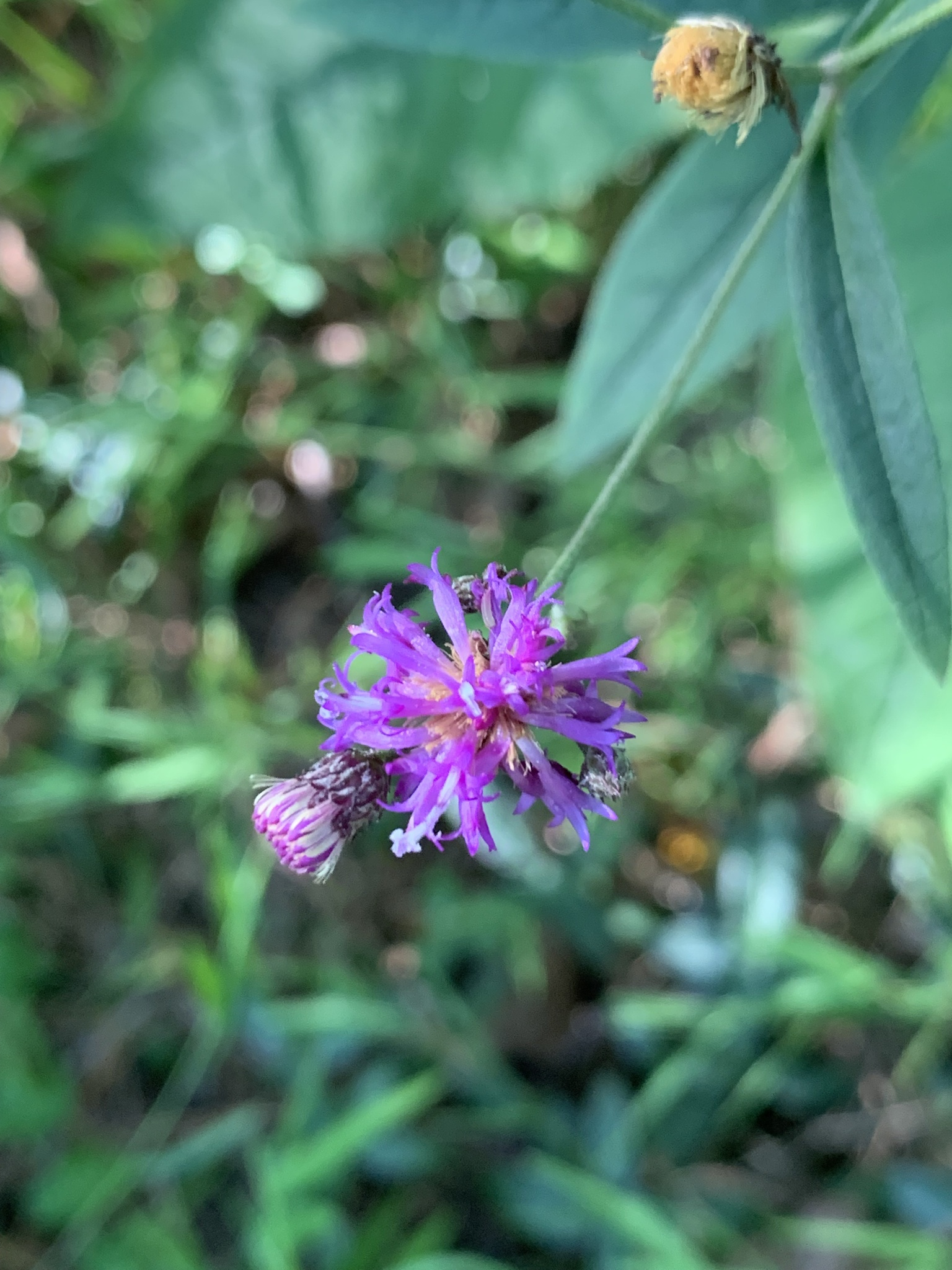

Scientific classification
- Kingdom: Plantae
- Clade: Tracheophytes
- Clade: Angiosperms
- Clade: Eudicots
- Clade: Asterids
- Order: Asterales
- Family: Asteraceae
- Genus: Vernonia
- Species: V. glauca

Binomial name
- Vernonia glauca Willd.

= Vernonia glauca =

Species of flowering plant

Vernonia glauca, Upland Ironweed, Appalachian Ironweed, of Broadleaf Ironweed, is a species of herbaceous perennial flowering plant in the family Asteraceae. It is endemic to the eastern United States.

V. glauca has been observed growing in habitats such as creek margins, wetlands, and woodlands.
