= Vernonia zollingerianoides =

Conservation status
- Vulnerable (IUCN 2.3)

Scientific classification
- Kingdom: Plantae
- Clade: Tracheophytes
- Clade: Angiosperms
- Clade: Eudicots
- Clade: Asterids
- Order: Asterales
- Family: Asteraceae
- Genus: Vernonia
- Species: V. zollingerianoides

Binomial name
- Vernonia zollingerianoides Sch.Bip.

Species of flowering plant

Vernonia zollingerianoides is a species of flowering plant in the family Asteraceae. It is endemic to Java in Indonesia and considered a vulnerable species on the IUCN Red List.
