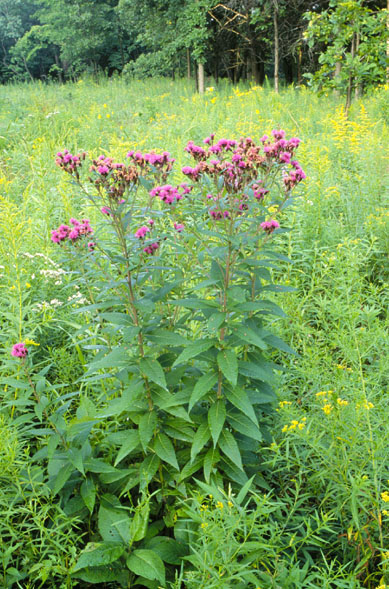

Conservation status
- Secure (NatureServe)

Scientific classification
- Kingdom: Plantae
- Clade: Tracheophytes
- Clade: Angiosperms
- Clade: Eudicots
- Clade: Asterids
- Order: Asterales
- Family: Asteraceae
- Genus: Vernonia
- Species: V. fasciculata

Binomial name
- Vernonia fasciculata Michx.

Synonyms
- List: Cacalia corymbosa Kuntze; Cacalia fasciculata (Michx.) Kuntze; Plectreca corymbosa Raf.; Serratula corymbosa Poir.; Vernonia corymbosa Schwein.; Vernonia fasciculata subsp. corymbosa (Schwein.) S.B.Jones; Vernonia fasciculata var. corymbosa (Schwein.) Daniels; Vernonia fasciculata var. nebraskensis Gleason; Vernonia schweinitzii Steud.

= Vernonia fasciculata =

Species of plant

Vernonia fasciculata, the smooth ironweed or common ironweed, or prairie ironweed is a species of perennial plant in the family Asteraceae. It is native to Manitoba in Canada and the north-central U.S.A.

Vernonia fasciculata inhabits areas with moist soils and prairies. It flowers in July to September.

== Description ==
Vernonia fasciculata is a herbaceous perennial that grows 2–4 ft (0.61–1.22 m) tall with unbranched stems, which end in an inflorescences with magenta flowers arranged in a dense corymb.

== Cultivation ==
V. fasciculata is winter hardy in USDA zones 4-9, it is planted in full sun and used in rain gardens and as a naturalized plant because of its showy flower display, it is deer tolerant and adaptable to wet soils.
