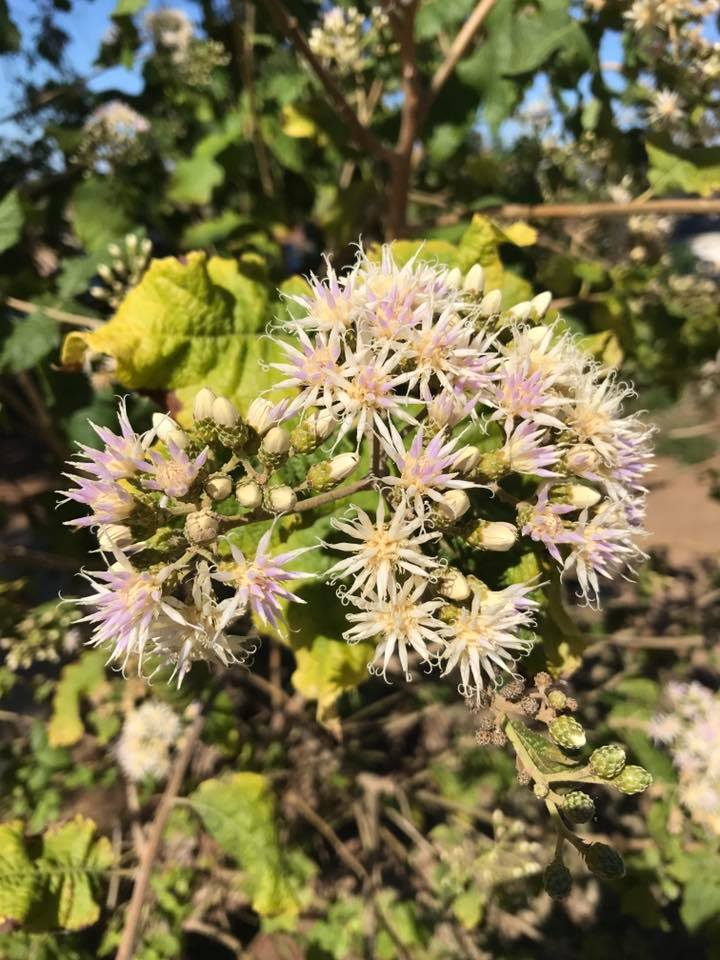

Scientific classification
- Kingdom: Plantae
- Clade: Tracheophytes
- Clade: Angiosperms
- Clade: Eudicots
- Clade: Asterids
- Order: Asterales
- Family: Asteraceae
- Genus: Vernonia
- Species: V. colorata

Binomial name
- Vernonia colorata (Willd.) Drake

= Vernonia colorata =

Species of flowering plant

Vernonia colorata is a species of plant in the family Asteraceae. It is endemic to tropical and southern Africa.

It is commonly known as the "bitterleaf," and is often used as an herb and a leafy green in west and central African cuisine.
