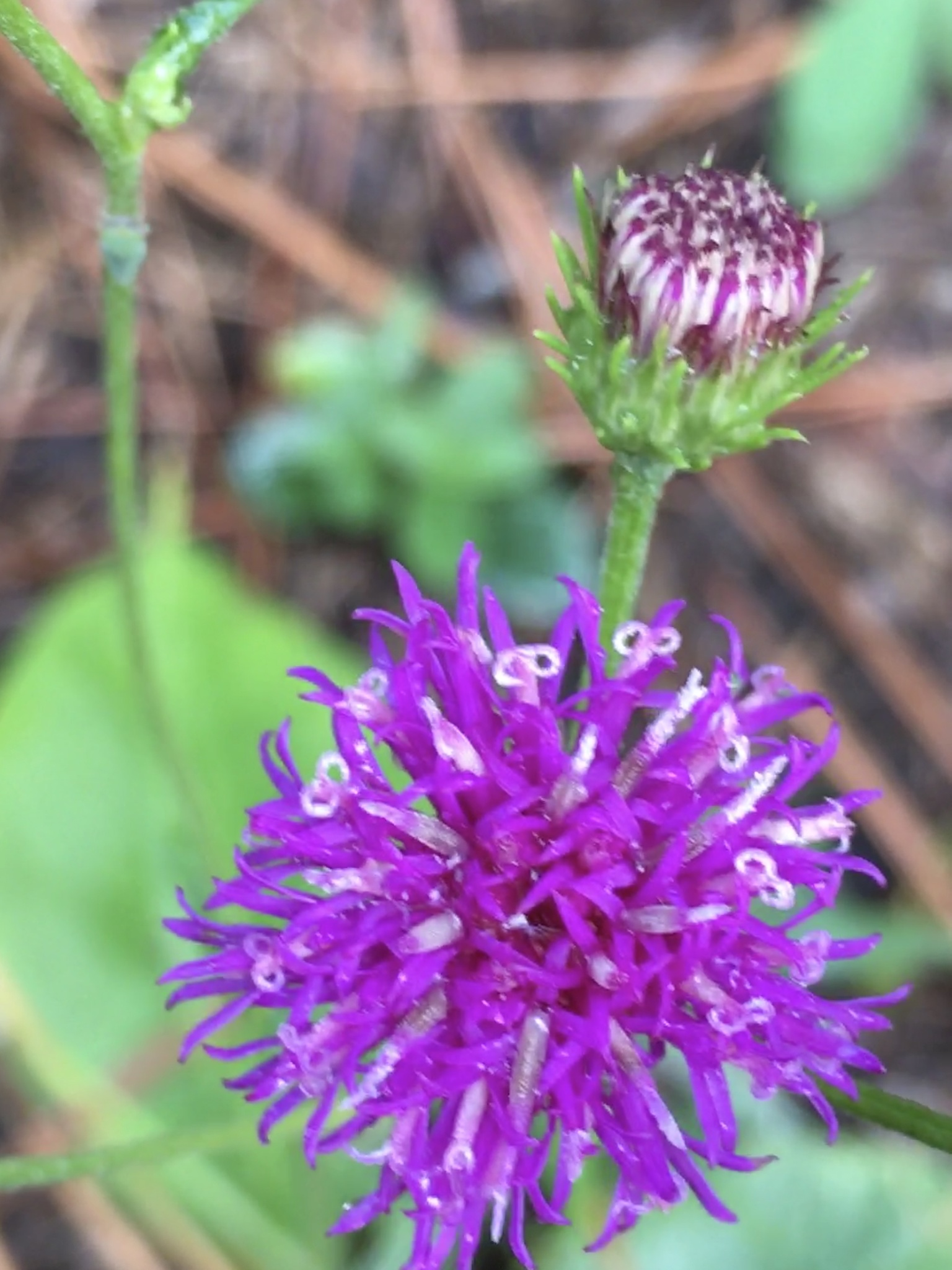

Scientific classification
- Kingdom: Plantae
- Clade: Tracheophytes
- Clade: Angiosperms
- Clade: Eudicots
- Clade: Asterids
- Order: Asterales
- Family: Asteraceae
- Genus: Vernonia
- Species: V. acaulis

Binomial name
- Vernonia acaulis Gleason

= Vernonia acaulis =

Species of plant

Vernonia acaulis, common names stemless ironweed and flatwoods ironweed, is a species of perennial plant in the family Asteraceae. It is native to the U.S.
