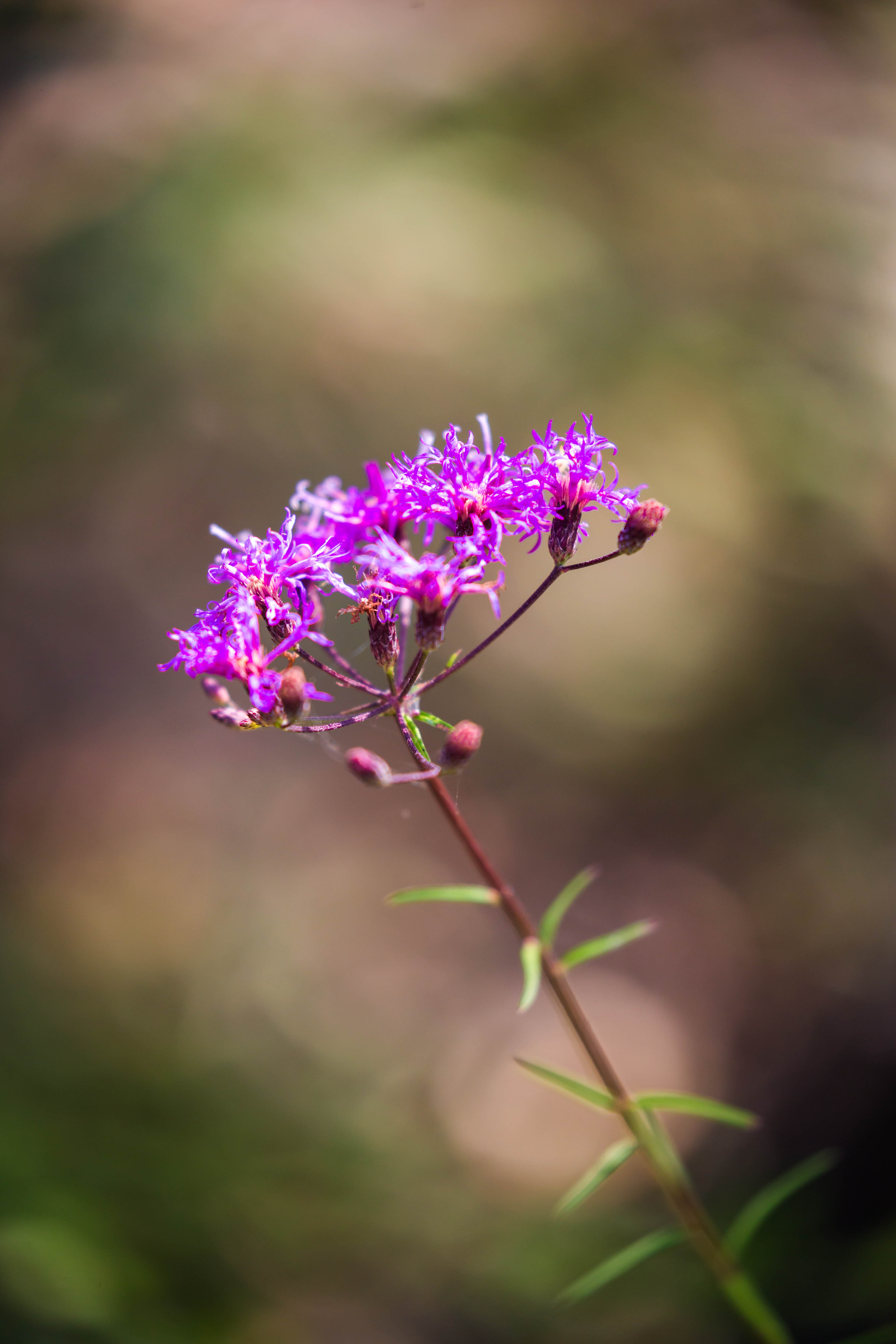

Scientific classification
- Kingdom: Plantae
- Clade: Embryophytes
- Clade: Tracheophytes
- Clade: Spermatophytes
- Clade: Angiosperms
- Clade: Eudicots
- Clade: Asterids
- Order: Asterales
- Family: Asteraceae
- Genus: Vernonia
- Species: V. angustifolia

Binomial name
- Vernonia angustifolia Michx.

Synonyms
- Cacalia angustifolia (Michx.) Kuntze; Cacalia graminifolia (Walter) Kuntze; Chrysocoma angustifolia Steud.; Chrysocoma graminifolia Walter; Liatris umbellata Bertol.; Vernonia altissima Walp.; Vernonia recurva Gleason; Vernonia scaberrima Nutt.

= Vernonia angustifolia =

Species of flowering plant

Vernonia angustifolia is a species of flowering plant in the family Asteraceae, native to the southeastern United States (Alabama, Florida, Georgia, Louisiana, Mississippi, North Carolina and South Carolina). It was first described by André Michaux in 1803.

Within the United States' Coastal Plain region, this species has been observed in habitats such as longleaf pine savannas, second growth hardwood systems, slash pine-wiregrass flats, and cabbage palm hammocks.

== Ecology ==
Vernonia angustifolia is insect pollinated and is recorded to have been visited in northern Florida by Lasioglossum reticulatum, Megachile albitarsis, Megachile georgica’', Megachile inimica, Megachile mendica, Megachile petulans, Megachile texana, Melissodes comptoides, and Svastra atripes.
