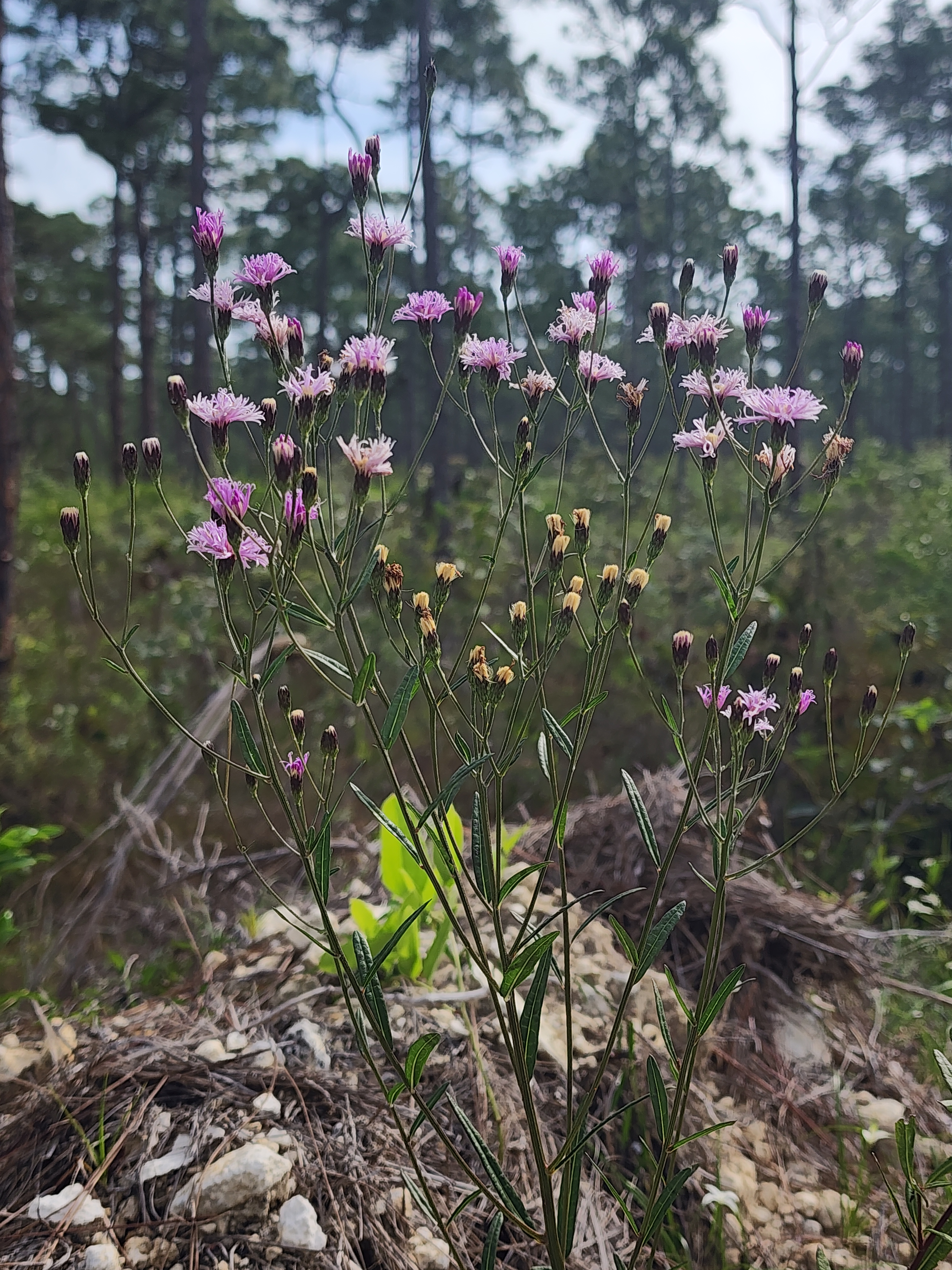
- Blooming in Bahamian pineyard on Great Abaco

Conservation status
- Apparently Secure (NatureServe)

Scientific classification
- Kingdom: Plantae
- Clade: Tracheophytes
- Clade: Angiosperms
- Clade: Eudicots
- Clade: Asterids
- Order: Asterales
- Family: Asteraceae
- Genus: Vernonia
- Species: V. blodgettii

Binomial name
- Vernonia blodgettii Small

= Vernonia blodgettii =

Species of flowering plant

Vernonia blodgettii, the Florida ironweed or Blodgett's ironweed, is a species of perennial plant from family Asteraceae that is native to Florida and the Bahamas.
