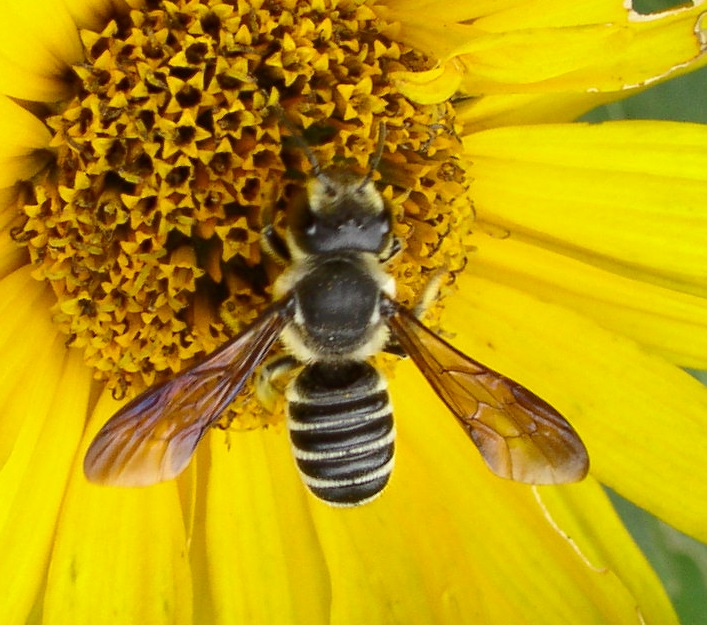
- Female on sunflower

Scientific classification
- Domain: Eukaryota
- Kingdom: Animalia
- Phylum: Arthropoda
- Class: Insecta
- Order: Hymenoptera
- Family: Megachilidae
- Genus: Megachile
- Species: M. inimica

Binomial name
- Megachile inimica Cresson, 1872

= Megachile inimica =

Species of leafcutter bee (Megachile)

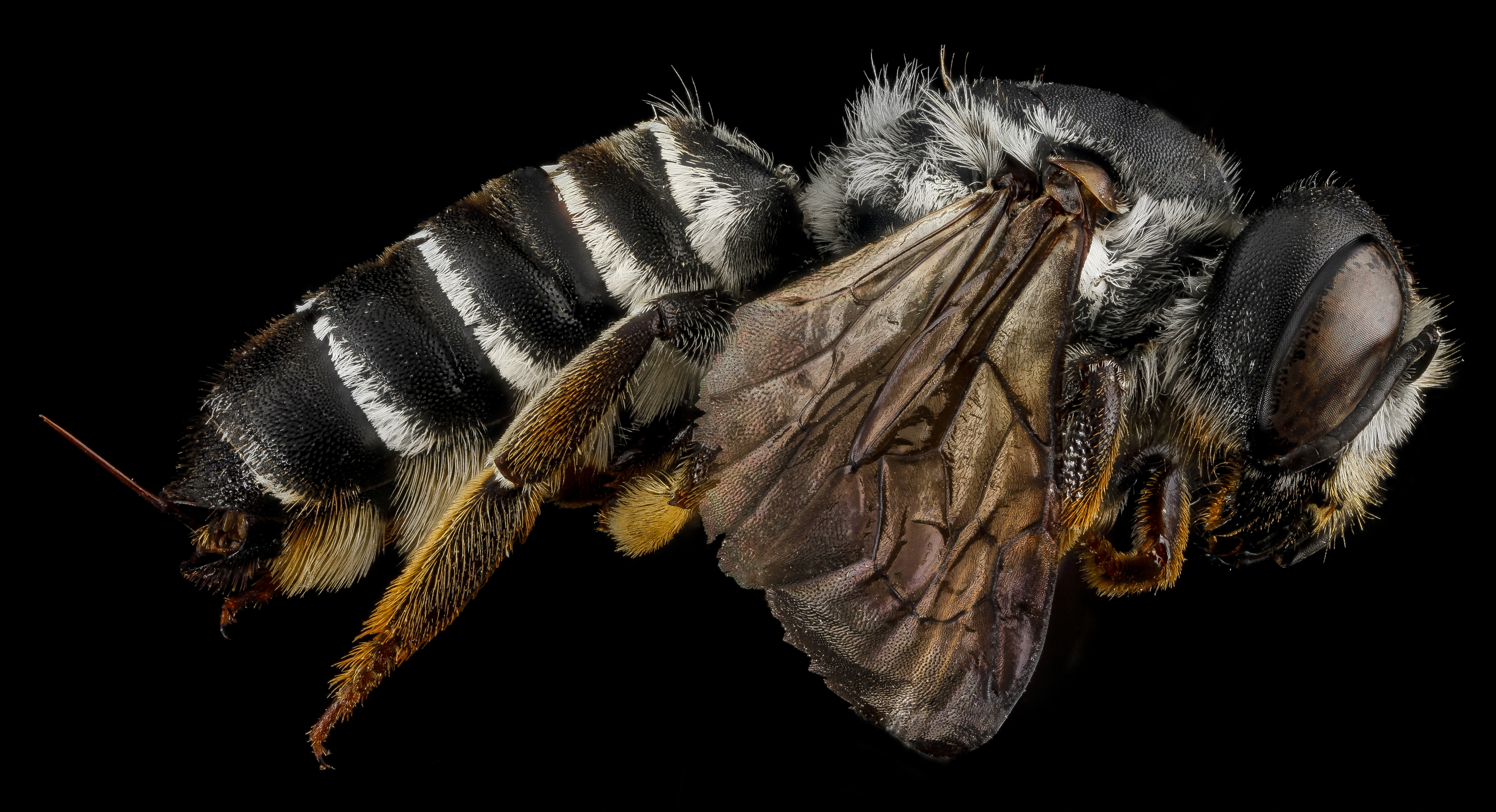
Megachile inimica

Megachile inimica (common name: hostile leaf-cutter bee) is a species of bee in the family Megachilidae. It was described by Ezra Townsend Cresson in 1872.

== Distribution ==
Megachile inimica is native to North and Central America, being found in Mexico, Guatemala and the southern United States.
