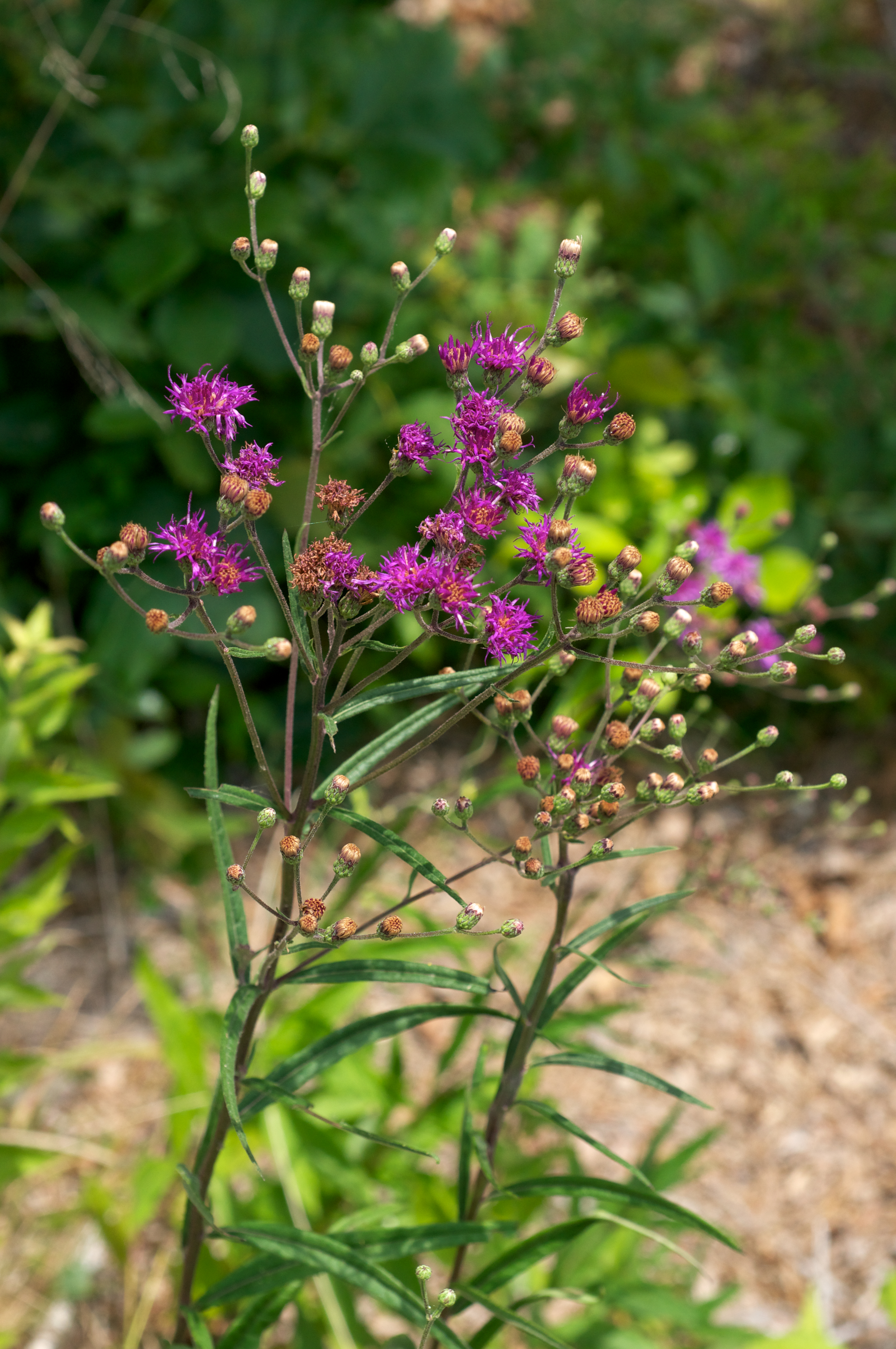

Scientific classification
- Kingdom: Plantae
- Clade: Tracheophytes
- Clade: Angiosperms
- Clade: Eudicots
- Clade: Asterids
- Order: Asterales
- Family: Asteraceae
- Genus: Vernonia
- Species: V. texana

Binomial name
- Vernonia texana (A.Gray) Small

= Vernonia texana =

Species of flowering plant

Vernonia texana, commonly called Texas ironweed, is a species of flowering plant in the aster family (Asteraceae). It is native eastern to North America, where it is found primarily in the South Central region of the United States. Its natural habitat is in open sandy woodlands.

Vernonia texana is an erect herbaceous perennial. Its leaves are alternate and linear-lanceolate. It produces purple heads of flowers in the summer.
