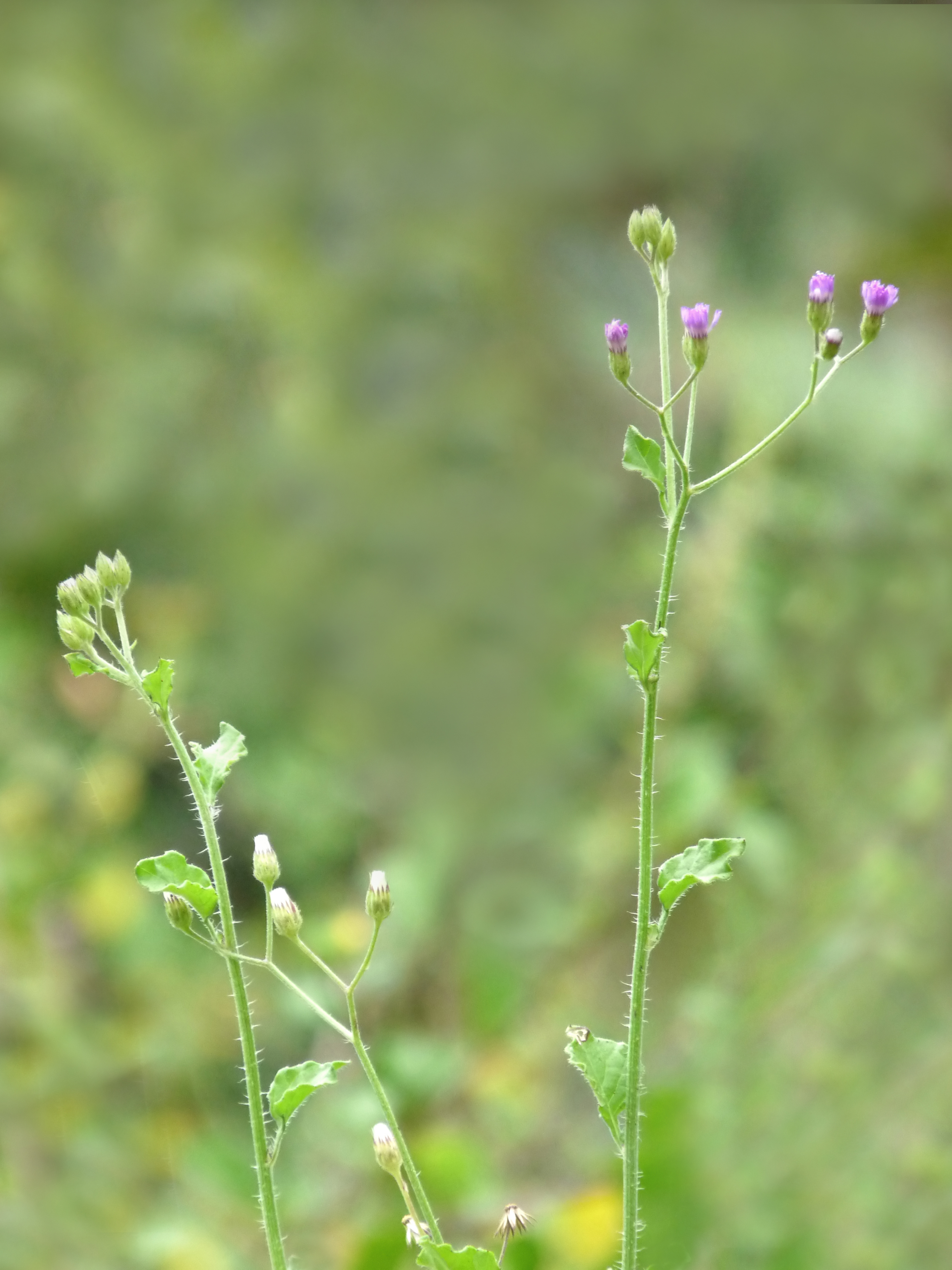
- In Kadavoor, Kerala, India

Scientific classification
- Kingdom: Plantae
- Clade: Embryophytes
- Clade: Tracheophytes
- Clade: Angiosperms
- Clade: Eudicots
- Clade: Asterids
- Order: Asterales
- Family: Asteraceae
- Genus: Cyanthillium
- Species: C. cinereum

Binomial name
- Cyanthillium cinereum (L.) H.Rob.

Synonyms
- Synonymy: Conyza cinerea L.; Serratula cinerea (L.) Roxb.; Vernonia cinerea (L.) Less.; Cacalia cinerea (L.) Kuntze; Cyanopis erigeroides DC.; Eupatorium myosotifolium Jacq.; Seneciodes cinereum (L.) Kuntze ex Kuntze; Vernonia cyanonioides Walp.; Vernonia dendigulensis DC.; Vernonia diffusa Decne.; Vernonia erigeroides (DC.) DC.; Vernonia lentii Volk. & O.Hoffm.; Vernonia leptophylla DC.; Vernonia montana Hook.f.; Vernonia parviflora Reinw.; Vernonia physalifolia DC.; Vernonia rhomboides Edgew.; Vernonia villosa W.F.Wright

= Cyanthillium cinereum =

Species of flowering plant in the daisy family

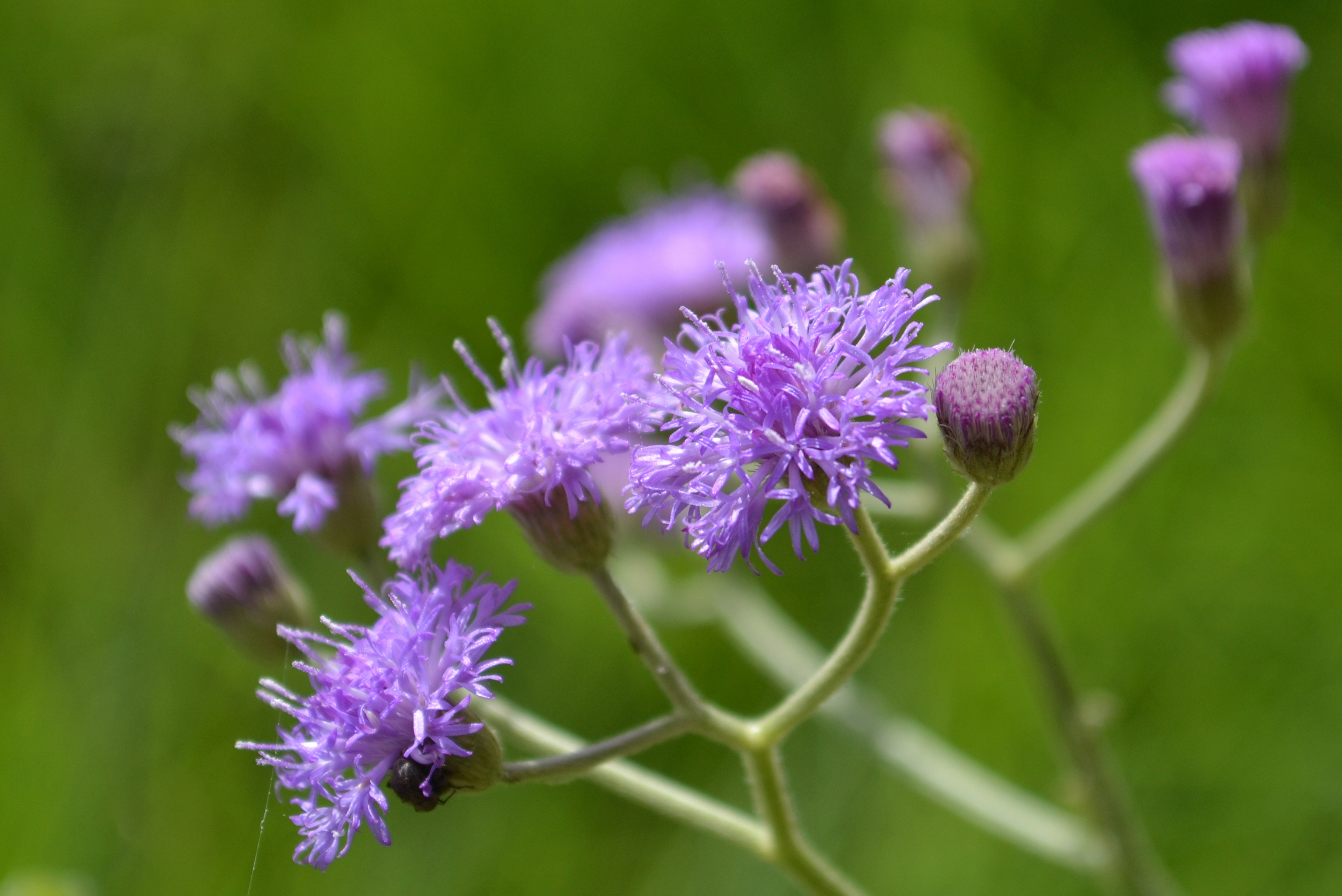
Cyanthillium cinereum - flower head

Cyanthillium cinereum (also known as little ironweed and poovamkurunnal or poovamkurunnila in Malayalam, and monara kudumbiya in Sinhalese) is a species of perennial plants in the sunflower family. The species is native to tropical Africa and to tropical Asia (India, Sri Lanka, Indochina, Indonesia, etc.) and has become naturalized in Australia, Mesoamerica, tropical South America, the West Indies, and the US State of Florida.

Cyanthillium cinereum is an annual herb up to 120 cm (4 feet) tall. It produces flat-topped arrays of numerous flower heads, each with pinkish or purplish disc florets but no ray florets. The species can be confused with Emilia sonchifolia, but the flower bracts of the latter are much longer and vase-shaped.

Cyanthillium cinereum has been used for smoking cessation in Thailand and other countries, and as relief for the common cold.

It used to be called Vernonia cinerea, but apparently there was a taxonomic update, sometime prior to early 2014.
