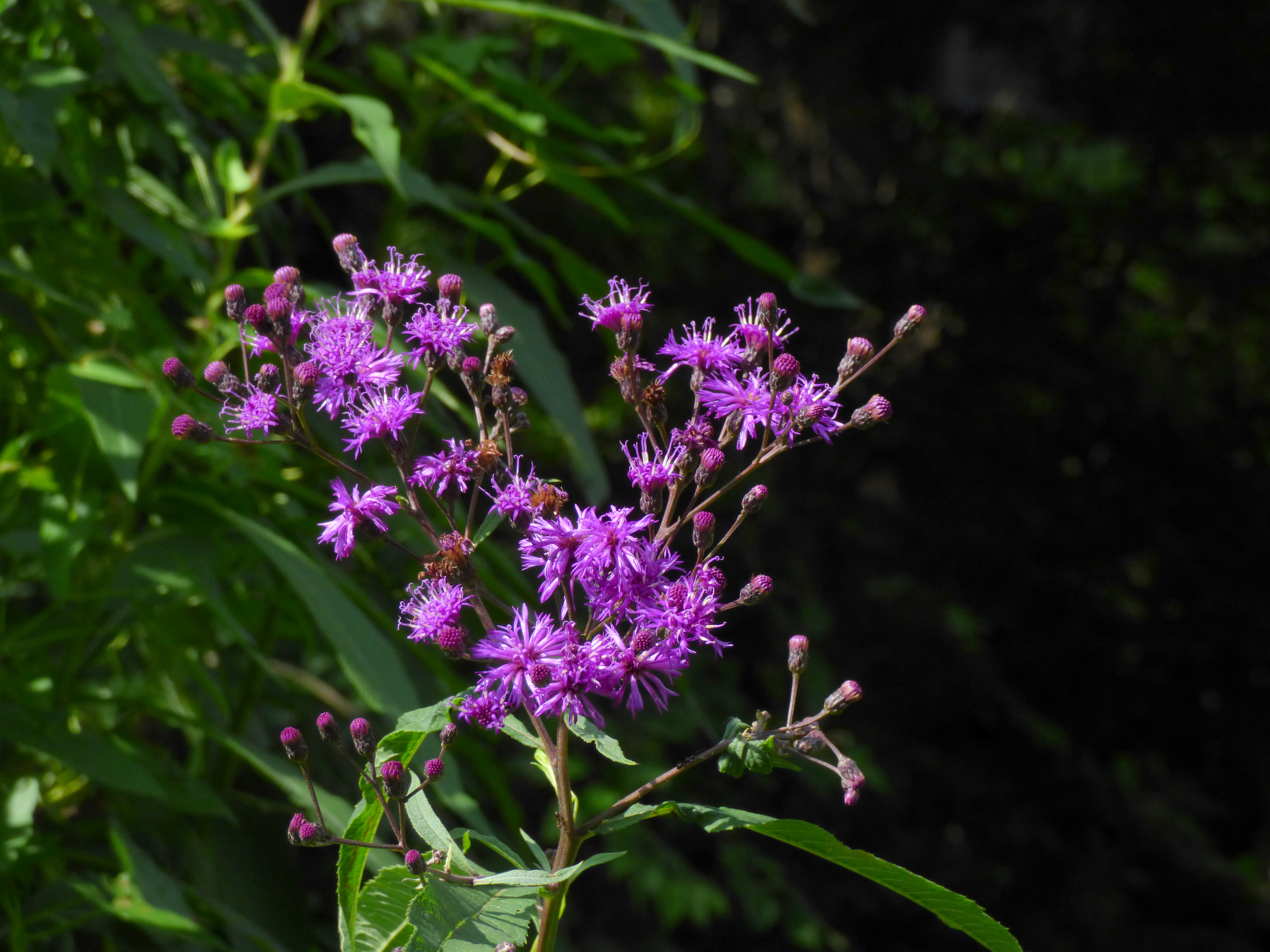
- Tall ironweed near Cincinnati, Ohio

Scientific classification
- Kingdom: Plantae
- Clade: Tracheophytes
- Clade: Angiosperms
- Clade: Eudicots
- Clade: Asterids
- Order: Asterales
- Family: Asteraceae
- Genus: Vernonia
- Species: V. gigantea

Binomial name
- Vernonia gigantea (Walter) Trel.

= Vernonia gigantea =

Species of flowering plant

Vernonia gigantea (Vernonia gigantea ssp. gigantea) (synonyms: Vernonia altissima, Vernonia altissima var. lilacina, Vernonia altissima var. taeniotricha), (also known as giant ironweed, tall ironweed or ironweed) is a species of perennial plant from family Asteraceae found in United States and Canada. The plant is native to the eastern United States, north to New York state and Ontario, and southwest to Texas.

== Description ==
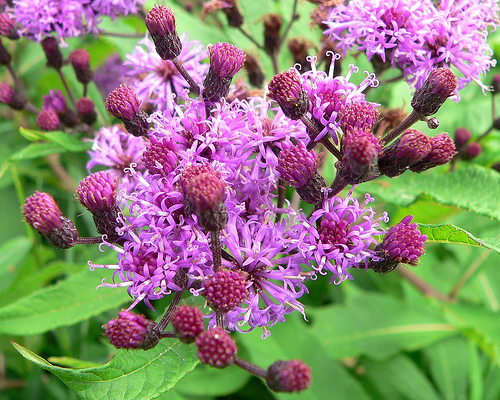
Tall Ironweed (Vernonia gigantea)

They are described as 0.9–2.1 metres (3–7 ft) tall, or 1.5 m–3.0 m × 0.3 m–0.6 m (5 ft–10 ft × 1 ft–2 ft). The stem is either green or purplish green coloured, and can be either hairy or pubescent. The leaves are up to 250 mm (10 in) long and 50 mm (2 in) across, and are ovate. Their leaves could also be lanceolate-oblong or elliptically shaped, with serrated margins. The leaves' upper surface is hairless and is dark green in colour. The leaves' bases may have a petiole or be sessile. The flowers open from July to September and are purple in colour. They can be found growing in moist soils along roadsides, and are common in meadows and open woodlands.

The seeds are wind-dispersed. The plant is self-incompatible and exhibits substantial ecotypic variation, a factor which may explain their broad geographic distribution.

== Ecology ==
V. gigantea is a larval host to the ironweed borer moth (Papaipema cerussata) and the red groundling moth (Perigea xanthioides).
