= List of Vernonia species =

Vernonia is a large, broadly distributed genus of flowering plants in the aster family, Asteraceae. As of January 2019, there are around 350 accepted species in Kew's Plants of the World Online.

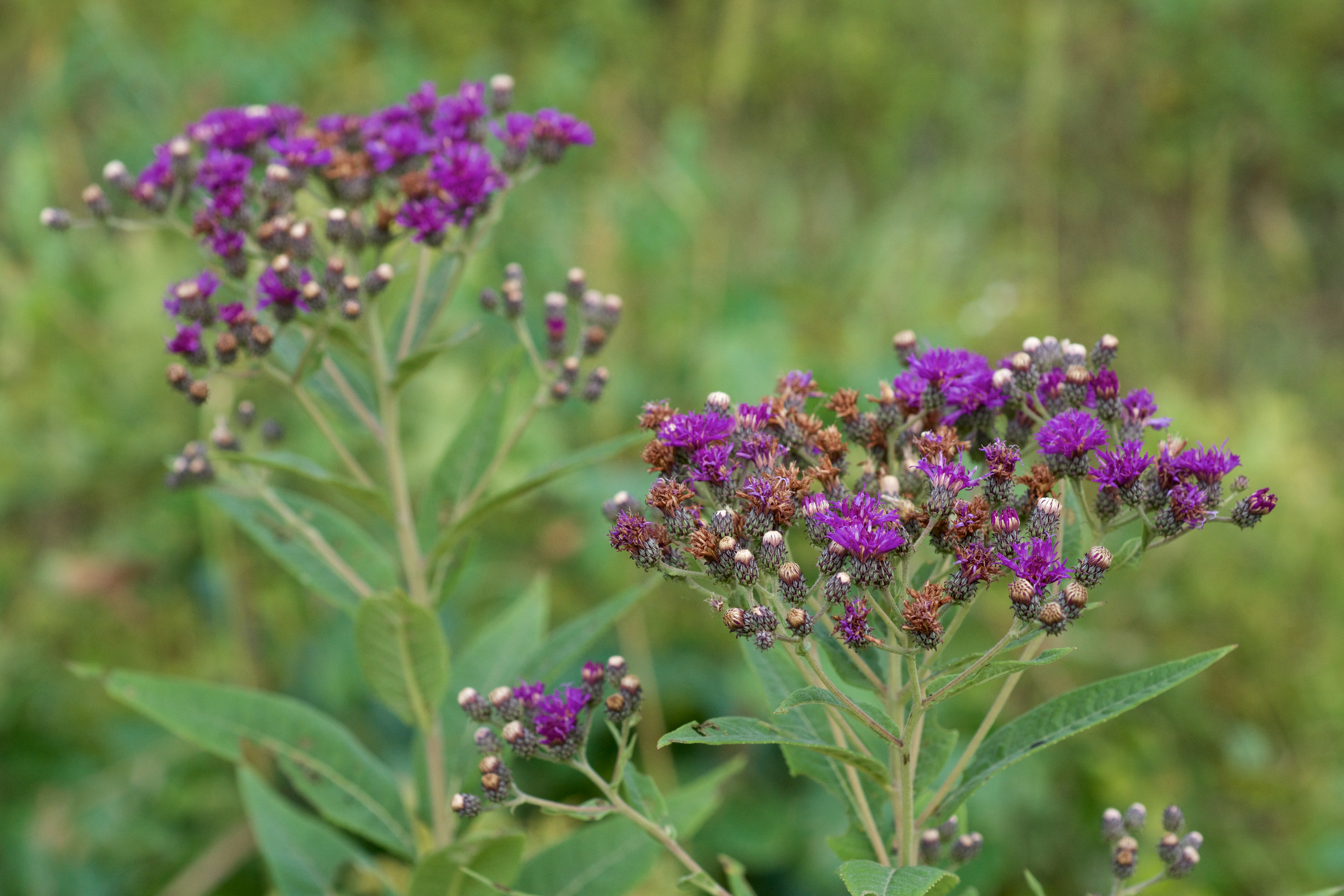
Vernonia baldwinii

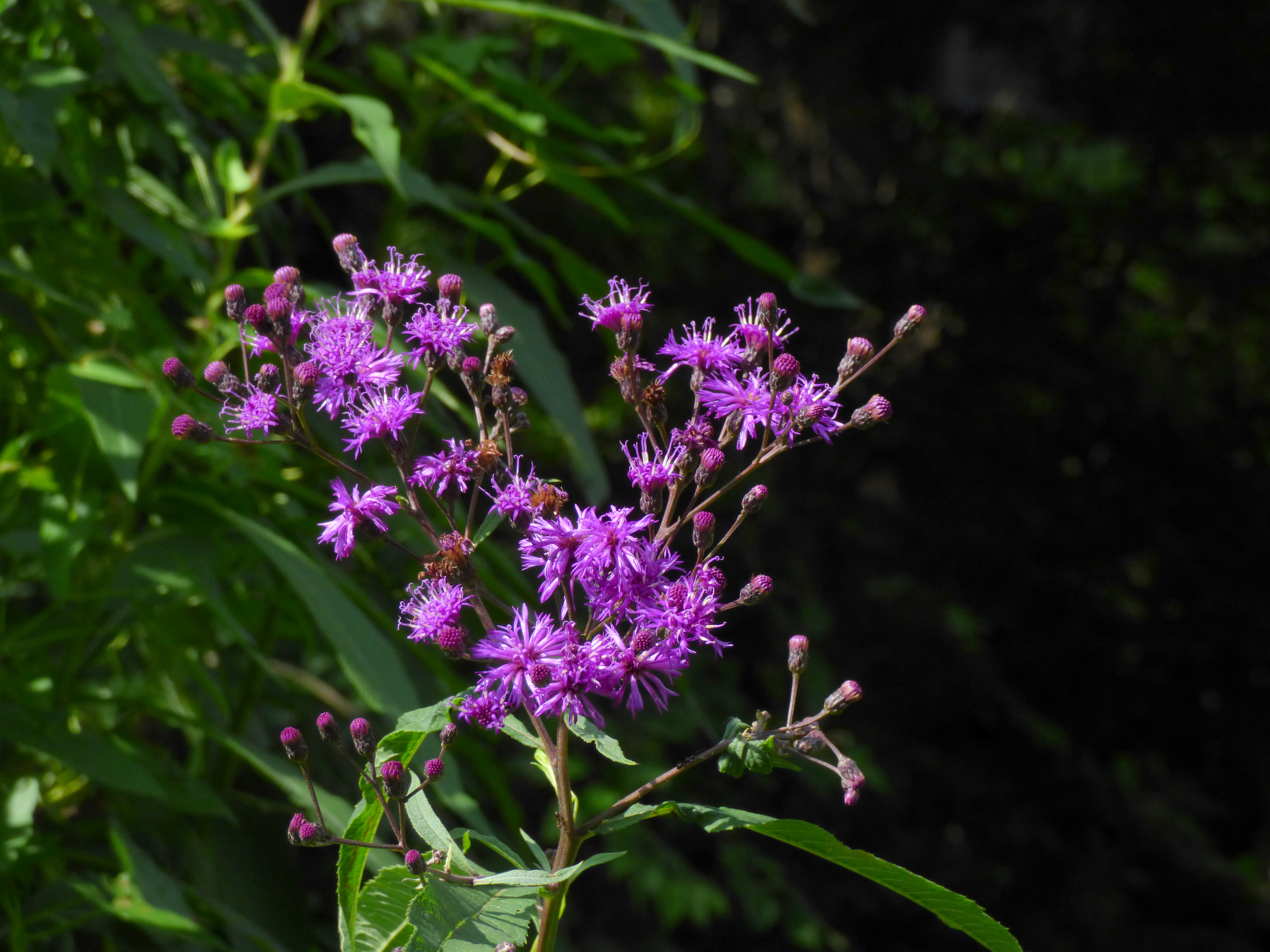
Vernonia gigantea

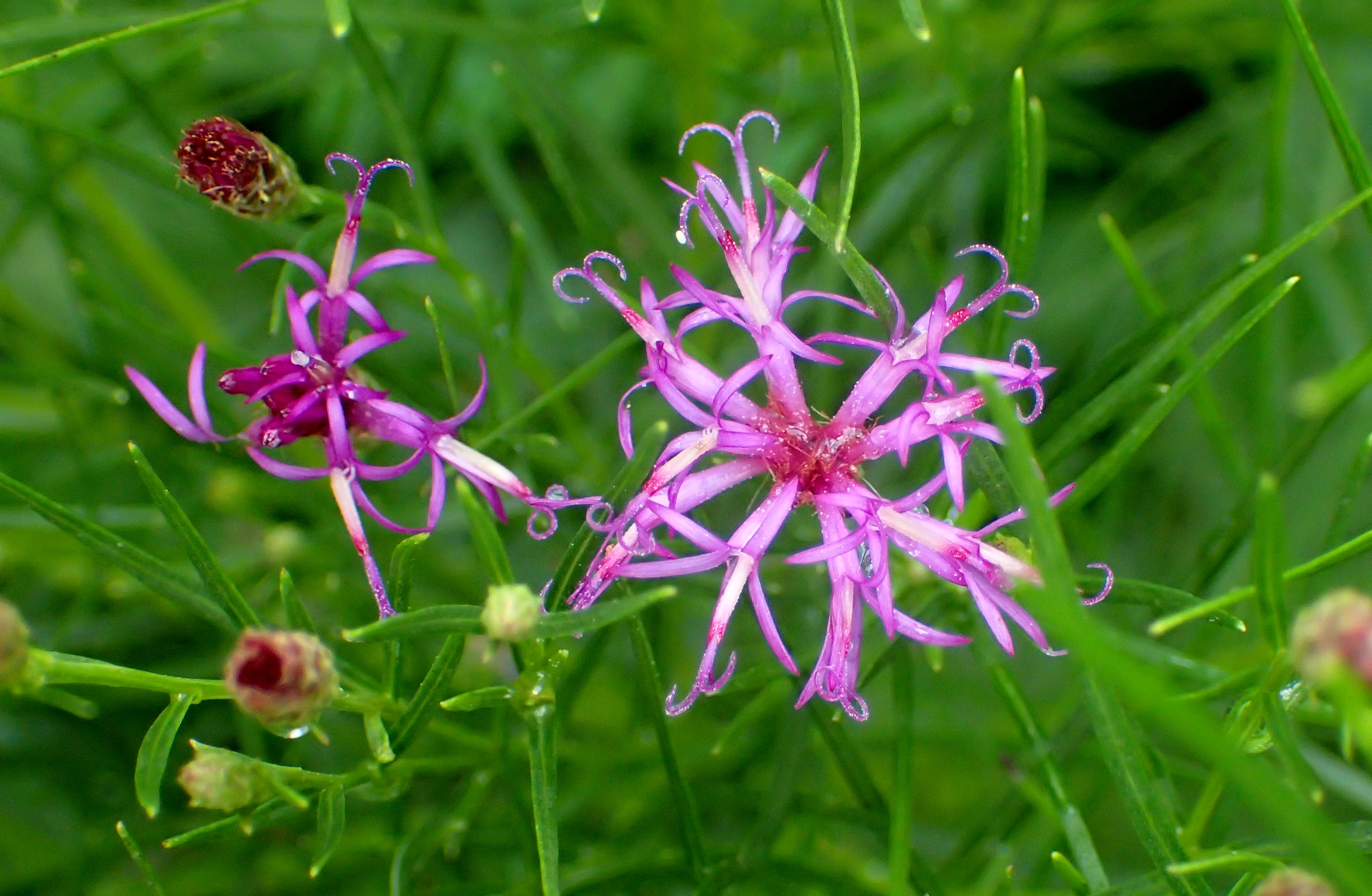
Vernonia lettermannii

== A ==
- Vernonia acaulis Gleason
- Vernonia acrophila Merr.
- Vernonia actaea J.Kost.
- Vernonia adenocephala S.Moore
- Vernonia albifolia J.Kost.
- Vernonia albosquama Y.L.Chen
- Vernonia alleizettei Humbert
- Vernonia alticola G.V.Pope
- Vernonia amboinensis J.Kost.
- Vernonia ambolensis Humbert
- Vernonia ambrensis Humbert
- Vernonia amoena S.Moore
- Vernonia ampandrandavensis Humbert
- Vernonia anamallica Bedd. ex Gamble
- Vernonia anandrioides S.Moore
- Vernonia andapensis Humbert
- Vernonia andohii C.D.Adams
- Vernonia angustifolia Michx.
- Vernonia annamensis S.Moore
- Vernonia anthelmintica (L.) Willd.
- Vernonia antunesii O.Hoffm.
- Vernonia aosteana Buscal. & Muschl.
- Vernonia apoensis Elmer
- Vernonia arabica F.G.Davies
- Vernonia areysiana Deflers
- Vernonia arkansana DC.
- Vernonia aschersonii Sch.Bip.
- Vernonia aschersonioides Chiov.

== B ==
- Vernonia baillonii Scott Elliot
- Vernonia balansae Gagnep.
- Vernonia baldwinii Torr.
- Vernonia bambilorensis Berhaut
- Vernonia bauchiensis Hutch. & Dalziel
- Vernonia bealliae McVaugh
- Vernonia beddomei Hook.f.
- Vernonia benguellensis Hiern
- Vernonia benguetensis Elmer
- Vernonia betsilensis Drake
- Vernonia betsimisaraka Humbert
- Vernonia bipontini Vatke
- Vernonia blodgettii Small
- Vernonia bonapartei Gagnep.
- Vernonia bontocensis Merr.
- Vernonia boquerona B.L.Turner
- Vernonia borneensis Miq.
- Vernonia bottae Jaub. & Spach
- Vernonia bourneana W.W.Sm.
- Vernonia brachytrichoides C.Jeffrey
- Vernonia brazzavillensis Aubrév. ex Compère
- Vernonia brideliifolia O.Hoffm.
- Vernonia britteniana Hiern
- Vernonia bruceae C.Jeffrey
- Vernonia bruceana Wild
- Vernonia buchingeri Sch.Bip. ex Steetz
- Vernonia bulo-burtiensis Mesfin

== C ==
- Vernonia calulu Hiern
- Vernonia campicola S.Moore
- Vernonia capituliflora Miq.
- Vernonia carnea Hiern
- Vernonia carnotiana Humbert
- Vernonia cephalophora Oliv.
- Vernonia chapmanii C.D.Adams
- Vernonia chevalieri Gagnep.
- Vernonia chiliocephala O.Hoffm.
- Vernonia cinerea (L.) Less.
- Vernonia cleanthoides O.Hoffm.
- Vernonia clinopodioides O.Hoffm.
- Vernonia cockburniana Balf.f.
- Vernonia coerulea J.Kost.
- Vernonia colorata (Willd.) Drake
- Vernonia concinna Gleason
- Vernonia concinna S.Moore
- Vernonia confusa Redonda-Mart., Villaseñor & A.Campos
- Vernonia congolensis De Wild. & Muschl.
- Vernonia conyzoides DC.
- Vernonia corchoroides Muschl.
- Vernonia coronata J.Kost.
- Vernonia cryptocephala Baker
- Vernonia cylindrica Sch.Bip. ex Walp.
- Vernonia cymosa Blume

== D ==
- Vernonia dalettiensis Mesfin
- Vernonia daphnifolia O.Hoffm.
- Vernonia decaryana Humbert
- Vernonia delapsa Baker
- Vernonia dembocola Kalanda
- Vernonia devredii Kalanda
- Vernonia dewildemaniana Muschl.
- Vernonia didessana Mesfin
- Vernonia dissimilis Gleason
- Vernonia diversifolia Bojer ex DC.
- Vernonia divulgata S.Moore
- Vernonia djalonensis A.Chev.
- Vernonia dranensis S.Moore
- Vernonia drymaria Klatt
- Vernonia durifolia J.Kost.
- Vernonia duvigneaudii Kalanda

== E ==
- Vernonia echioides Less.
- Vernonia elmeri Merr.
- Vernonia evrardiana Kalanda
- Vernonia extranea S.Moore
- Vernonia eylesii S.Moore

== F ==
- Vernonia fasciculata Michx.
- Vernonia faustiana (Chapm.) B.L.Turner
- Vernonia fimbrillata J.Kost.
- Vernonia fischeri O.Hoffm.
- Vernonia flaccidifolia Small
- Vernonia flanaganii (E.Phillips) Hilliard
- Vernonia floresiana J.Kost.
- Vernonia forbesii S.Moore
- Vernonia fractiflexa Wild
- Vernonia friisii Mesfin

== G ==
- Vernonia galamensis (Cass.) Less.
- Vernonia galpinii Klatt
- Vernonia ganevii D.J.N.Hind
- Vernonia × georgiana Bartlett
- Vernonia gerrardii Harv.
- Vernonia gertii Dematt.
- Vernonia gigantea (Walter) Trel.
- Vernonia gilbertii Mesfin
- Vernonia glandulifolia Merr.
- Vernonia glauca Willd.
- Vernonia goetzenii O.Hoffm.
- Vernonia gofensis O.Hoffm.
- Vernonia golungensis Welw. ex Mendonça
- Vernonia gossweileri S.Moore
- Vernonia gossypina Gamble
- Vernonia graniticola G.V.Pope
- Vernonia greggii A.Gray
- Vernonia griseopapposa G.V.Pope
- Vernonia guadalupensis A.Heller

== H ==
- Vernonia hamata Klatt
- Vernonia helenae Buscal. & Muschl.
- Vernonia helferi Hook.f.
- Vernonia helodea Wild
- Vernonia hispidula Drake
- Vernonia holstii O.Hoffm.
- Vernonia homollei Humbert
- Vernonia huillensis Hiern
- Vernonia humillima Humbert
- Vernonia hyalina C.E.C.Fisch.

== I –J ==
- Vernonia ianthina Muschl.
- Vernonia ikongensis Humbert
- Vernonia inanis S.Moore
- Vernonia incana Less.
- Vernonia isalensis Humbert
- Vernonia ischnophylla Muschl.
- Vernonia isoetifolia Wild
- Vernonia jaegeri C.D.Adams
- Vernonia joyaliae B.L.Turner
- Vernonia junghuhniana J.Kost.

== K ==
- Vernonia kabaensis J.Kost.
- Vernonia kamerunensis Mattf.
- Vernonia kandtii Muschl.
- Vernonia kannikattiensis Rajakumar, Selvak., S.Murug. & Chellap.
- Vernonia kapirensis De Wild.
- Vernonia kapolowensis Kalanda
- Vernonia karvinskiana DC.
- Vernonia kasaiensis Kalanda
- Vernonia kawoziensis F.G.Davies
- Vernonia kayuniana G.V.Pope
- Vernonia kenteocephala Baker
- Vernonia kigomae C.Jeffrey
- Vernonia klattii MacLeish
- Vernonia klossii S.Moore
- Vernonia kradungensis H.Koyama

== L ==
- Vernonia lafukensis S.Moore
- Vernonia lamii J.Kost.
- Vernonia lancifolia Merr.
- Vernonia larseniae B.L.King & S.B.Jones
- Vernonia latisquamata (Humbert) Humbert
- Vernonia lavandulifolia Muschl. ex De Wild.
- Vernonia leandrii Humbert
- Vernonia ledermannii Mattf.
- Vernonia ledocteana P.A.Duvign. & Van Bockstal
- Vernonia lemurica Humbert
- Vernonia leonensis Cabrera
- Vernonia leptanthus Klatt
- Vernonia letlensis J.Kost.
- Vernonia lettermannii Engelm. ex A.Gray
- Vernonia limosa O.Hoffm.
- Vernonia lindheimeri A.Gray & Engelm.
- Vernonia lisowskii Kalanda
- Vernonia loandensis S.Moore
- Vernonia longibracteata S.Ortiz & Rodr.Oubiña
- Vernonia lualabaensis De Wild.
- Vernonia luhomeroensis Q.Luke & Beentje
- Vernonia lundiensis (Hutch.) Wild & G.V.Pope
- Vernonia luxuriosa J.Kost.
- Vernonia lycioides Wild

== M ==
- Vernonia macrachaenia Gagnep.
- Vernonia madefacta Wild
- Vernonia malabarica Hook.f.
- Vernonia mandrarensis Humbert
- Vernonia manongarivensis Humbert
- Vernonia marginata (Torr.) Raf.
- Vernonia marojejyensis Humbert
- Vernonia mastersii
- Vernonia mazzocchii-alemannii Chiov.
- Vernonia mbalensis G.V.Pope
- Vernonia mecistophylla Baker
- Vernonia meeboldii W.W.Sm.
- Vernonia melanocoma C.Jeffrey
- Vernonia mesogramme O.Hoffm.
- Vernonia mikumiensis C.Jeffrey
- Vernonia milanjiana S.Moore
- Vernonia mildbraedii Muschl.
- Vernonia mindanaensis Merr.
- Vernonia miombicola Wild
- Vernonia miombicoloides C.Jeffrey
- Vernonia missurica
- Vernonia mogadoxensis Chiov.
- Vernonia moluccensis Miq.
- Vernonia monantha Humbert
- Vernonia moritziana Sch.Bip.
- Vernonia mossambicensis Buscal. & Muschl.
- Vernonia muelleri Wild
- Vernonia mumpullensis Hiern
- Vernonia mushituensis Wild
- Vernonia mutimushii Wild

== N ==
- Vernonia najas Wild
- Vernonia napus O.Hoffm.
- Vernonia neocoursiana Humbert
- Vernonia neoperrieriana Humbert
- Vernonia nepetifolia Wild
- Vernonia neumanniana O.Hoffm.
- Vernonia newbouldii Beentje & Mesfin
- Vernonia noveboracensis (L.) Michx.
- Vernonia nuxioides O.Hoffm. & Muschl.

== O ==
- Vernonia obionifolia O.Hoffm.
- Vernonia occulta Redonda-Mart. & Mora-Jarvio
- Vernonia ochyrae Lisowski
- Vernonia orchidorrhiza Welw. ex Hiern
- Vernonia orgyalis S.Moore
- Vernonia ornata S.Moore
- Vernonia otophora Mattf.

== P – Q ==
- Vernonia pachyclada Baker
- Vernonia pandurata Link
- Vernonia papillosissima Chiov.
- Vernonia papuana Lauterb.
- Vernonia parapetersii C.Jeffrey
- Vernonia parryae C.E.C.Fisch.
- Vernonia patentissima J.Kost.
- Vernonia pellegrinii Humbert ex Basse
- Vernonia phanerophlebia Merr.
- Vernonia phillipsiae S.Moore
- Vernonia phlomoides Muschl.
- Vernonia pierrei Gagnep.
- Vernonia pinarensis Kitan.
- Vernonia platylepis Drake
- Vernonia plumbaginifolia Fenzl
- Vernonia poggeana O.Hoffm.
- Vernonia polyantha Warb.
- Vernonia popeana C.Jeffrey
- Vernonia potamophila Baker
- Vernonia praticola S.Moore
- Vernonia prolifera Decne.
- Vernonia pseudoappendiculata Humbert
- Vernonia pseudojugalis Muschl.
- Vernonia pulchella Small
- Vernonia pulgarensis Elmer
- Vernonia pygmaea O.Hoffm.
- Vernonia quangensis O.Hoffm.

== R ==
- Vernonia raui Uniyal
- Vernonia recurvata G.M.Barroso
- Vernonia reinwardtiana de Vriese & Miq. ex Miq.
- Vernonia retifolia S.Moore
- Vernonia revoluta Buch.-Ham.
- Vernonia rhodanthoidea Muschl.
- Vernonia rhodesiana S.Moore
- Vernonia rhodophylla O.Hoffm.
- Vernonia robecchiana Muschl.
- Vernonia robinsonii Wild
- Vernonia rosenii R.E.Fr.
- Vernonia roseo-violacea De Wild.
- Vernonia rubens Wild
- Vernonia rufuensis Muschl.
- Vernonia rupicola Ridl.
- Vernonia ruvungatundu C.Jeffrey
- Vernonia ruwenzoriensis S.Moore

== S ==
- Vernonia sabulosa Beentje & Mesfin
- Vernonia saigonensis Gagnep.
- Vernonia sakalava Humbert
- Vernonia sambiranensis (Humbert) Humbert
- Vernonia sangka Kerr
- Vernonia sapinii De Wild.
- Vernonia scaettae Humbert & Staner
- Vernonia schlechteri O.Hoffm.
- Vernonia schliebenii Mattf.
- Vernonia schubotziana Muschl.
- Vernonia schweinfurthii Oliv. & Hiern
- Vernonia sclerophylla O.Hoffm.
- Vernonia scoparia O.Hoffm.
- Vernonia sechellensis Baker
- Vernonia sengana S.Moore
- Vernonia sericolepis O.Hoffm.
- Vernonia seyrigii Humbert
- Vernonia shabaensis Kalanda
- Vernonia sidamensis O.Hoffm.
- Vernonia solweziensis Wild
- Vernonia spathulata Hochst. ex Sch.Bip.
- Vernonia speiracephala Baker
- Vernonia spenceriana Muschl.
- Vernonia sphacelata Klatt
- Vernonia staehelinoides Harv.
- Vernonia stuhlmannii O.Hoffm.
- Vernonia subacaulis Gagnep.
- Vernonia subdentata J.Kost.
- Vernonia subplumosa O.Hoffm.
- Vernonia subscandens R.E.Fr.
- Vernonia subsimplex Miq.
- Vernonia subtilis J.Kost.
- Vernonia sumbavensis J.Kost.
- Vernonia suprafastigiata Klatt
- Vernonia syringifolia O.Hoffm.

== T ==
- Vernonia tanalensis Baker
- Vernonia tanganyikensis R.E.Fr.
- Vernonia temnolepis O.Hoffm.
- Vernonia tengwallii J.Kost.
- Vernonia teucrioides Welw. ex O.Hoffm.
- Vernonia teusczii Klatt
- Vernonia tewoldei Mesfin
- Vernonia texana Small
- Vernonia thodei E.Phillips
- Vernonia thomsonii Hook.f.
- Vernonia thulinii Mesfin
- Vernonia timorensis J.Kost.
- Vernonia timpermaniana Kalanda
- Vernonia tinctosetosa C.Jeffrey
- Vernonia trachyphylla Muschl.
- Vernonia tricholoba C.Jeffrey
- Vernonia tropophila Humbert
- Vernonia tuberifera R.E.Fr.

== U – V ==
- Vernonia unicata C.Jeffrey
- Vernonia upembaensis Kalanda
- Vernonia vaginata O.Hoffm.
- Vernonia vallicola S.Moore
- Vernonia verdickii O.Hoffm. & Muschl.
- Vernonia verrucata Klatt
- Vernonia vietnamensis Bien
- Vernonia violacea Oliv. & Hiern ex Oliv.
- Vernonia violaceo-papposa De Wild.
- Vernonia vohemarensis Humbert
- Vernonia vollesenii C.Jeffrey
- Vernonia vulturina Shinners

== W – Z ==
- Vernonia wakefieldii Oliv.
- Vernonia walshae J.Kost.
- Vernonia welwitschii O.Hoffm.
- Vernonia wetarensis J.Kost.
- Vernonia wollastonii S.Moore
- Vernonia yabelloana Mesfin
- Vernonia zambiana G.V.Pope
- Vernonia zernyi Gilli
