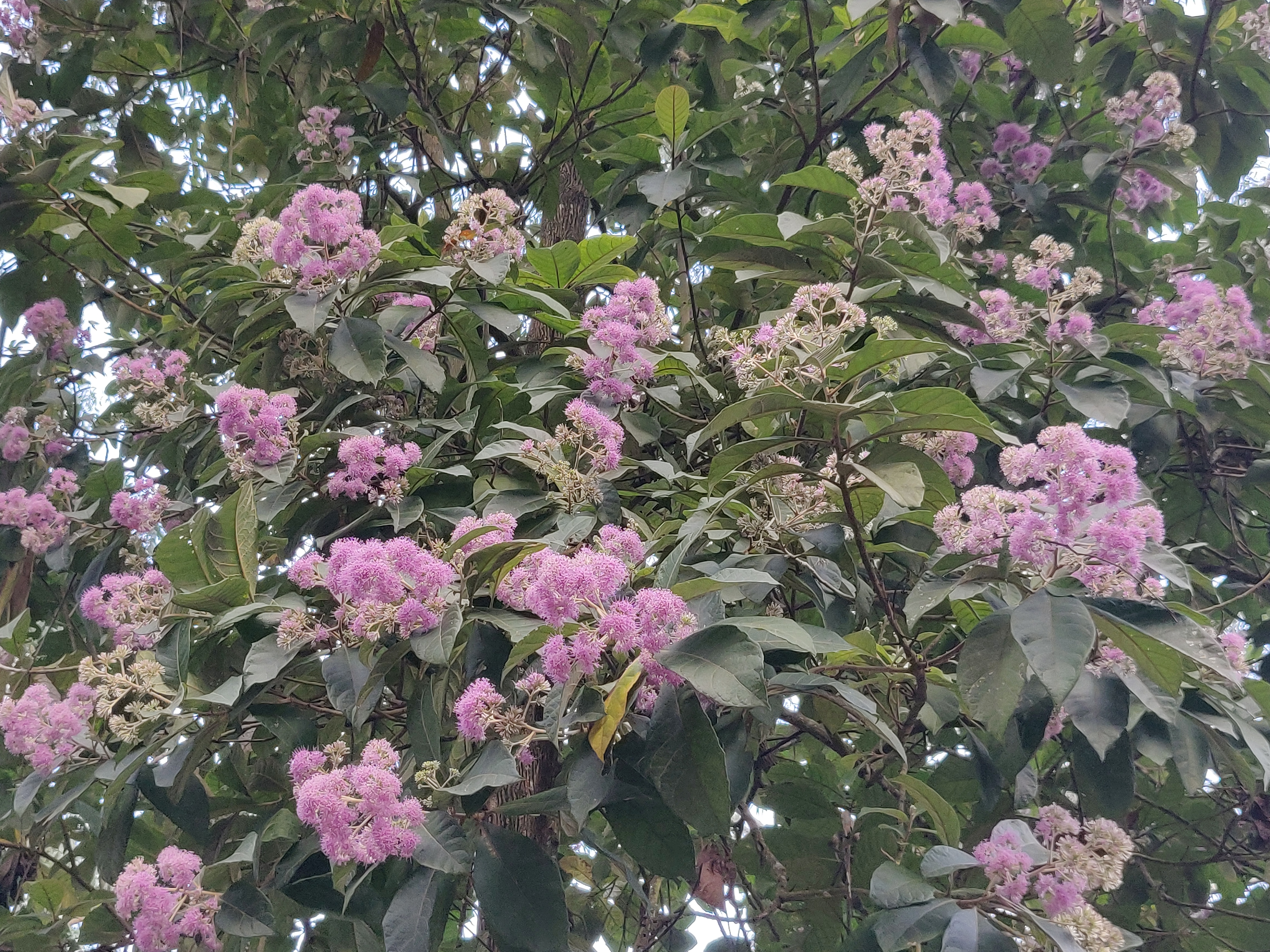
- Strobocalyx arborea in India

Scientific classification
- Kingdom: Plantae
- Clade: Tracheophytes
- Clade: Angiosperms
- Clade: Eudicots
- Clade: Asterids
- Order: Asterales
- Family: Asteraceae
- Subfamily: Vernonioideae
- Tribe: Vernonieae
- Genus: Strobocalyx (Blume ex DC.) Spach

Synonyms
- Flustula Raf.; Vernonia sect. Strobocalyx Blume ex DC.; Vernonia subsect. Strobocalyx (Blume ex DC.) S.B.Jones

= Strobocalyx =

Genus of plants

Strobocalyx is a genus of tropical Asian and Pacific Island plants in the tribe Vernonieae within the family Asteraceae. It is sometimes regarded as part of the genus Vernonia.

== Species ==
Ten species are accepted.

- Strobocalyx arborea (Buch.-Ham.) Sch.Bip. – Indian subcontinent, Southeast Asia, southern China
- Strobocalyx bockiana (Diels) H.Rob., S.C.Keeley, Skvarla & R.Chan – southern China
- Strobocalyx chunii (C.C.Chang) H.Rob., S.C.Keeley, Skvarla & R.Chan – Hainan
- Strobocalyx esculenta (Hemsl.) H.Rob., S.C.Keeley, Skvarla & R.Chan – south-Central China and Vietnam
- Strobocalyx insularum (A.Gray) Sch.Bip. – Fiji
- Strobocalyx pyrrhopappa Sch.Bip. – Philippines
- Strobocalyx mastersii B.Bhattacharjee, Lakshmin., S.K.Mukherjee & Av.Bhattacharjee – Assam
- Strobocalyx solanifolia (Benth.) Sch.Bip. – southern China, India, Indochina
- Strobocalyx sylvatica (Dunn) H.Rob., S.C.Keeley, Skvarla & R.Chan – southern China
- Strobocalyx vidalii (Merr.) H.Rob., S.C.Keeley, Skvarla & R.Chan – Philippines
- Strobocalyx wightiana (DC.) Sch.Bip. – southwestern India

=== Formerly included ===
several species now regarded as members of other genera, including Brenandendron, Decaneuropsis, Monosis, and Tarlmounia.

- Strobocalyx doniana - Brenandendron donianum
- Strobocalyx elaeagnifolia - Tarlmounia elliptica
- Strobocalyx elliptica - Tarlmounia elliptica
- Strobocalyx glandulosa (DC.) Sch.Bip. – Distephanus madagascariensis (Less.) H.Rob. & V.A.Funk
- Strobocalyx obovata - Decaneuropsis obovata
- Strobocalyx wightiana - Monosis wightiana
