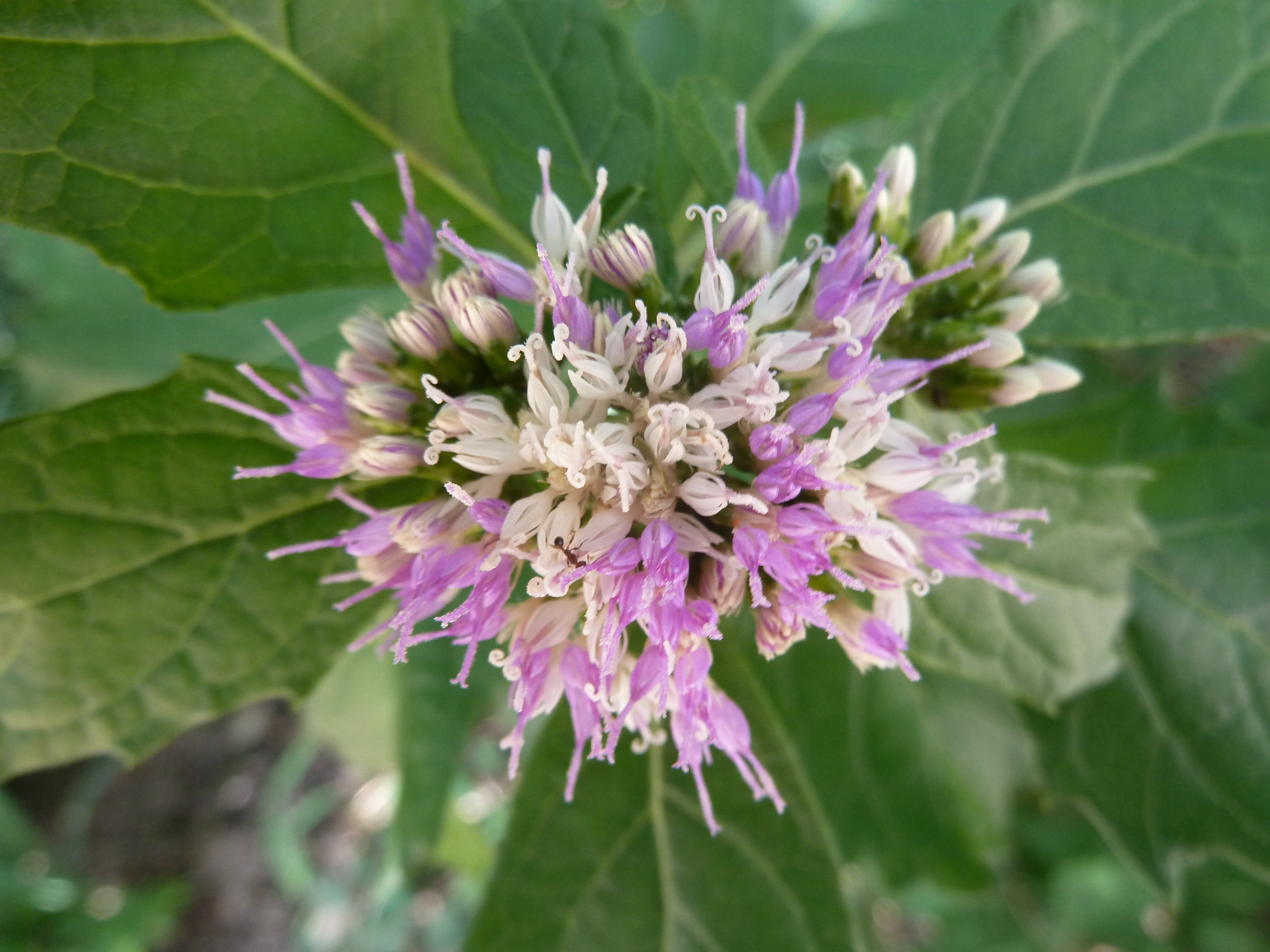
- Gymnanthemum corymbosum

Scientific classification
- Kingdom: Plantae
- Clade: Tracheophytes
- Clade: Angiosperms
- Clade: Eudicots
- Clade: Asterids
- Order: Asterales
- Family: Asteraceae
- Subfamily: Vernonioideae
- Tribe: Vernonieae
- Genus: Gymnanthemum; Cass.

Type species
- Gymnanthemum cupulare Cass.

Synonyms
- Bracheilema R.Br.; Cheliusia Sch.Bip.; Decaneurum sect. Gymnanthemum (Cass.) DC.; Keringa Raf.; Plectreca Raf.; Seneciodes sect. Gymnanthemum (Cass.) Kuntze; Vernonia sect. Gymnanthemum (Cass.) Benth.; Vernonia sect. Strobocalyx Blume ex DC.

= Gymnanthemum =

Genus of flowering plants

Gymnanthemum is a genus of plants in the tribe Vernonieae within the family Asteraceae. Species of the genus are found in Asia, Africa and South America.

Species

- Gymnanthemum amygdalinum
- Gymnanthemum andrangovalense
- Gymnanthemum antanalum
- Gymnanthemum appendiculatum
- Gymnanthemum auriculiferum
- Gymnanthemum baillonii
- Gymnanthemum baronii
- Gymnanthemum bellinghamii
- Gymnanthemum bolleanum
- Gymnanthemum carnotianum
- Gymnanthemum chapelieri
- Gymnanthemum coloratum
- Gymnanthemum corymbosum
- Gymnanthemum coursii
- Gymnanthemum crataegifolium
- Gymnanthemum cylindriceps
- Gymnanthemum delapsum
- Gymnanthemum dissolutum
- Gymnanthemum exsertiflorum
- Gymnanthemum exsertum
- Gymnanthemum extensum
- Gymnanthemum fimbrilliferum
- Gymnanthemum glaberrimum
- Gymnanthemum hispidulum
- Gymnanthemum humblotii
- Gymnanthemum koekemoerae
- Gymnanthemum louvelii
- Gymnanthemum mespilifolium
- Gymnanthemum metzianum
- Gymnanthemum myrianthum
- Gymnanthemum pectorale
- Gymnanthemum platylepis
- Gymnanthemum pleistanthum
- Gymnanthemum rubicundum
- Gymnanthemum rueppellii
- Gymnanthemum secundifolium
- Gymnanthemum subcrassulescens
- Gymnanthemum theophrastifolium
- Gymnanthemum thomsonianum
- Gymnanthemum triflorum
- Gymnanthemum urticifolium

Formerly included

numerous species now regarded as members of other genera: Acilepis Decaneuropsis Eremosis Kinghamia Monosis Phyllocephalum Strobocalyx Vernonia
