= E. salicifolia =

E. salicifolia may refer to:

- Eremosis salicifolia, a plant species in the genus Eremosis
- Euphorbia salicifolia, a plant species in the genus Euphorbia

== See also ==
- Salicifolia (disambiguation)
