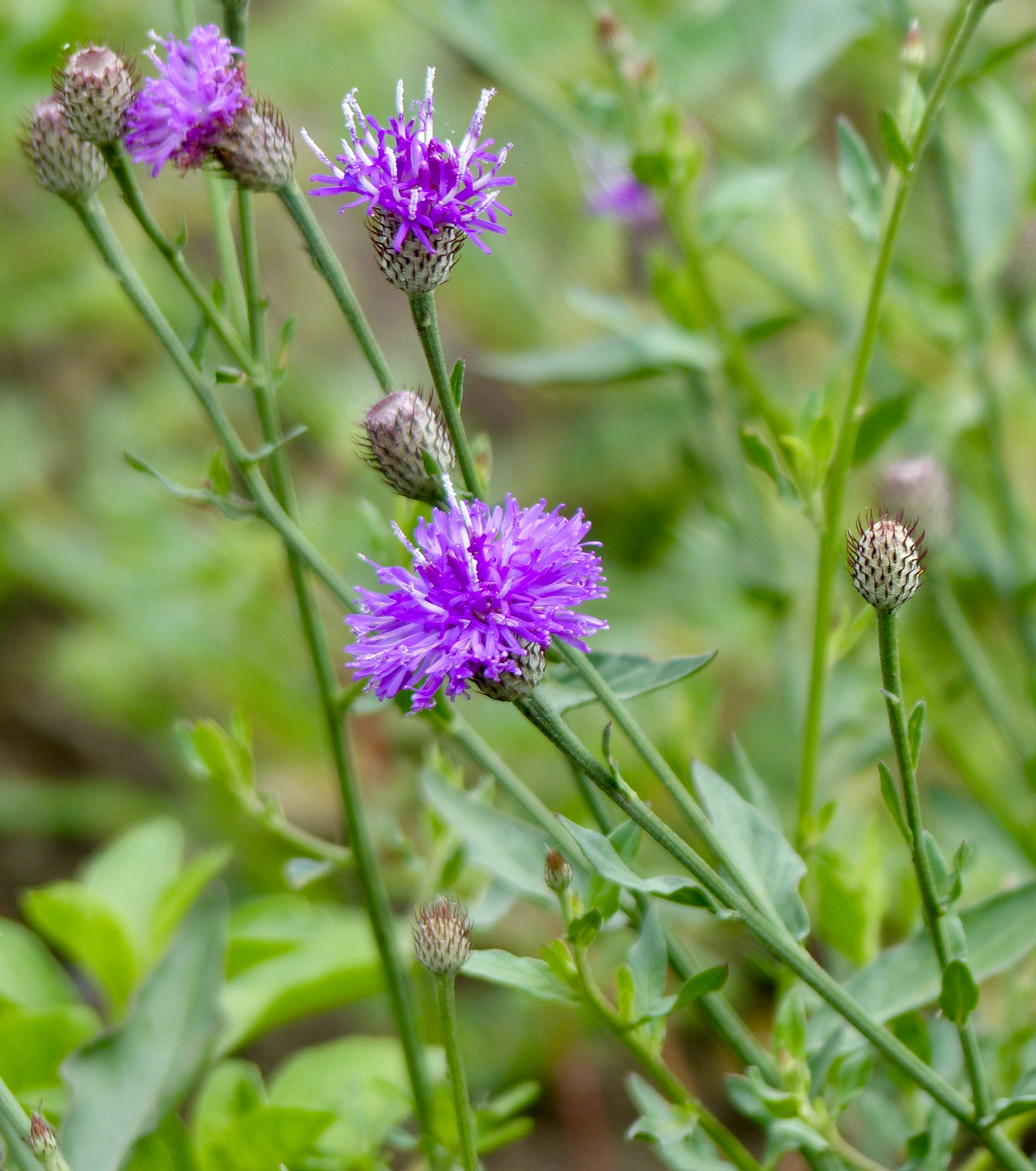
- Parapolydora fastigiata

Scientific classification
- Kingdom: Plantae
- Clade: Tracheophytes
- Clade: Angiosperms
- Clade: Eudicots
- Clade: Asterids
- Order: Asterales
- Family: Asteraceae
- Subfamily: Cichorioideae
- Tribe: Vernonieae
- Genus: Parapolydora; H.Rob.

= Parapolydora =

Genus of plants

Parapolydora is a genus of flowering plants belonging to the family Asteraceae.

Its native range is Southern Tropical and Southern Africa.

== Species ==
Species:

- Parapolydora fastigiata (Oliv. & Hiern) H.Rob.
- Parapolydora gerrardii (Harv.) H.Rob., Skvarla & V.A.Funk
