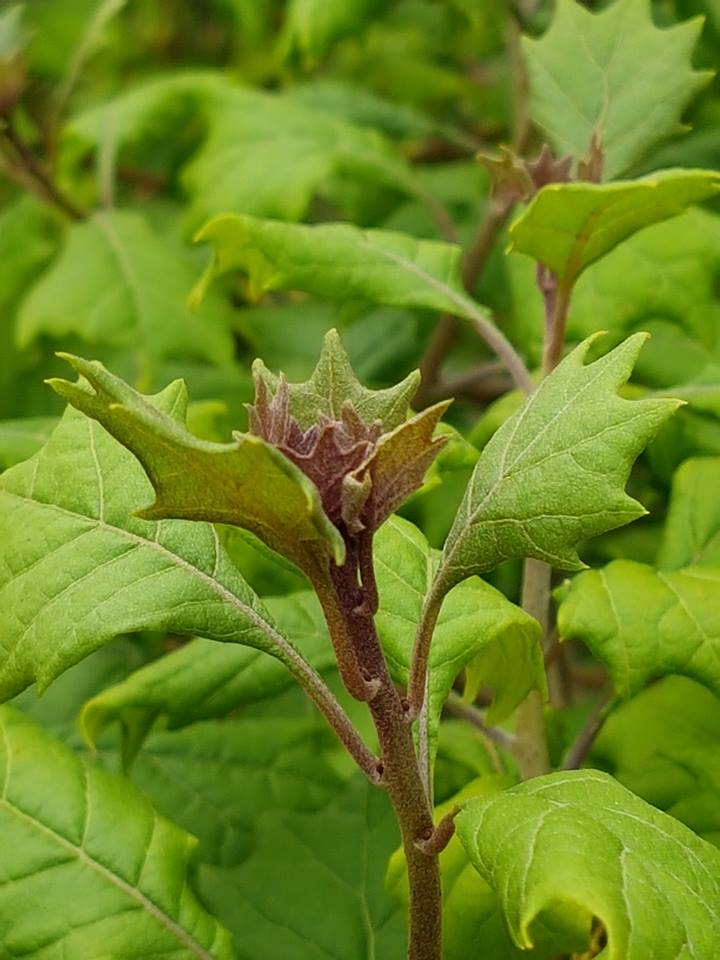

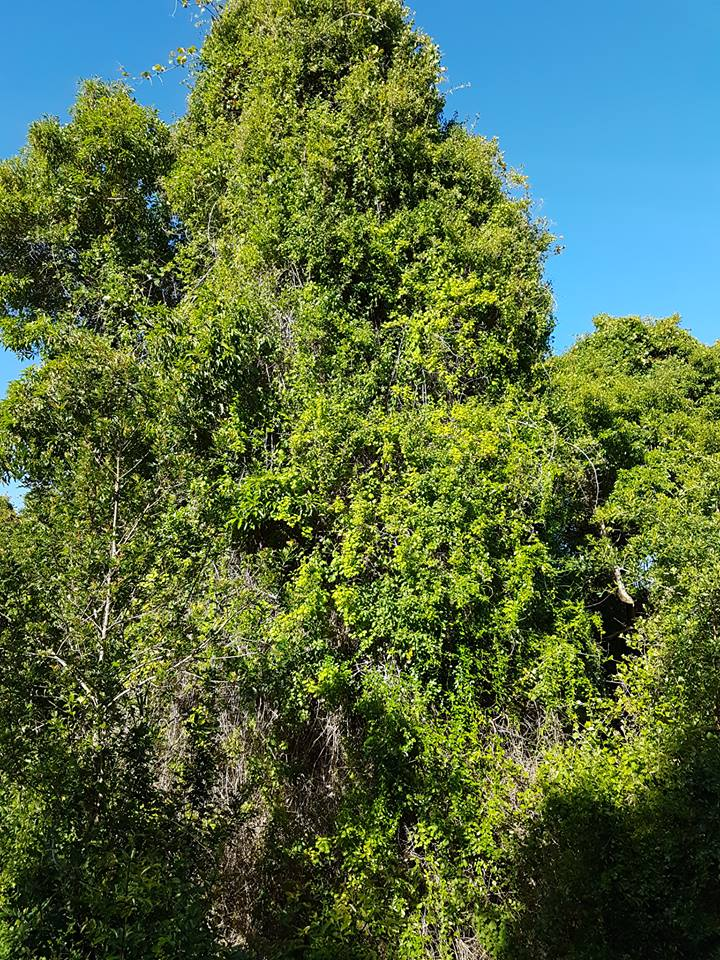
- Sprawling over trees and shrubs on forest margin

Scientific classification
- Kingdom: Plantae
- Clade: Tracheophytes
- Clade: Angiosperms
- Clade: Eudicots
- Clade: Asterids
- Order: Asterales
- Family: Asteraceae
- Genus: Gymnanthemum
- Species: G. mespilifolium

Binomial name
- Gymnanthemum mespilifolium (Less.) H.Rob.

Synonyms
- Cacalia mespilifolia (Less.) Kuntze; Eupatorium capense Spreng.f.; Vernonia mespilifolia Less.; Vernonia mespilifolia var. mespilifolia; Vernonia mespilifolia var. subcanescens DC.

= Gymnanthemum mespilifolium =

Species of flowering plant

Gymnanthemum mespilifolium (Greek gymnos = naked and anthos = flower, alluding to the lack of paleae on the receptacle - mespilifolium = leaf like that of Mespilus), is a sprawling woody liane up to 15 cm thick from Southern Africa occurring in the Eastern Cape, KwaZulu-Natal, Limpopo, Mpumalanga, Western Cape. This species is found as a vigorous pioneer in abused or degraded habitats such as cleared areas and forest margins. The genus comprises some 43 species found in sub-Saharan Africa, Madagascar, Southern Asia, and introduced into Brazil.

Gymnanthemum was first described by Cassini in 1817, then included in Vernonia by Candolle in 1836 and Bentham in 1873 and finally resurrected by Robinson and Kahn in 1986 and 1999. The taxonomic limits of the genus are presently narrower than in 1999. Currently nine species are recognised in southern Africa, of which five are endemic to South Africa. The other four are more widespread - they are Gymnanthemum theophrastifolium (Schweinf. ex Oliv. & Hiern) H. Rob., Gymnanthemum coloratum (Willd.) H. Rob. & B. Kahn, Gymnanthemum amygdalinum (Del.) Sch. Bip. ex Walp. and Gymnanthemum myrianthum (Hook. f.) H. Rob.

In the South African Journal of Botany Volume 102, January 2016, Pages 81–101, N.Swelankomo, J.C.Manning and A.R.Magee have proposed sinking Gymnanthemum mespilifolium in a new combination, Gymnanthemum capense.

== Gallery ==
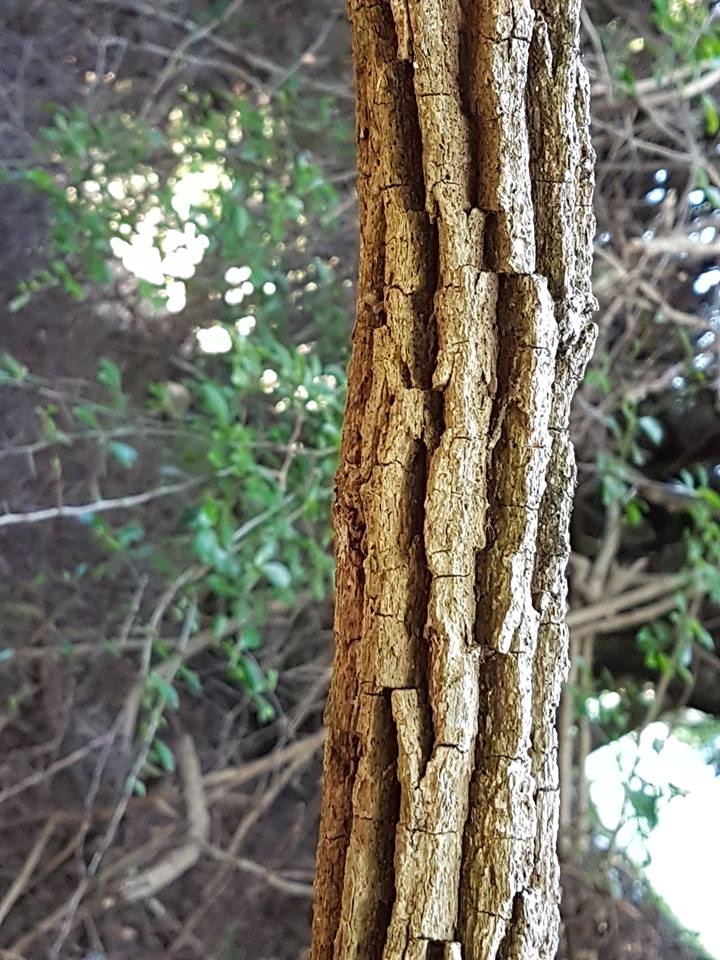

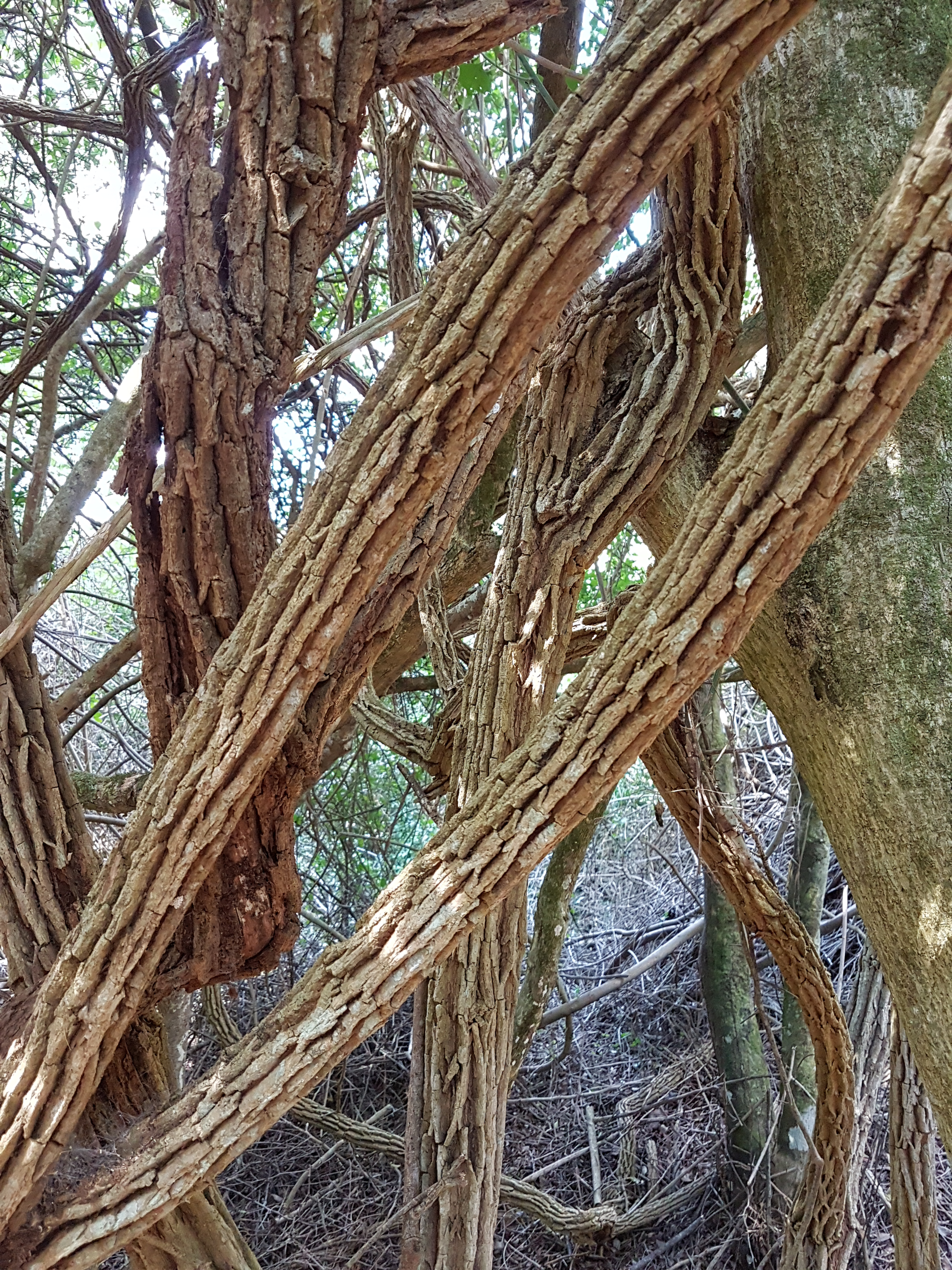

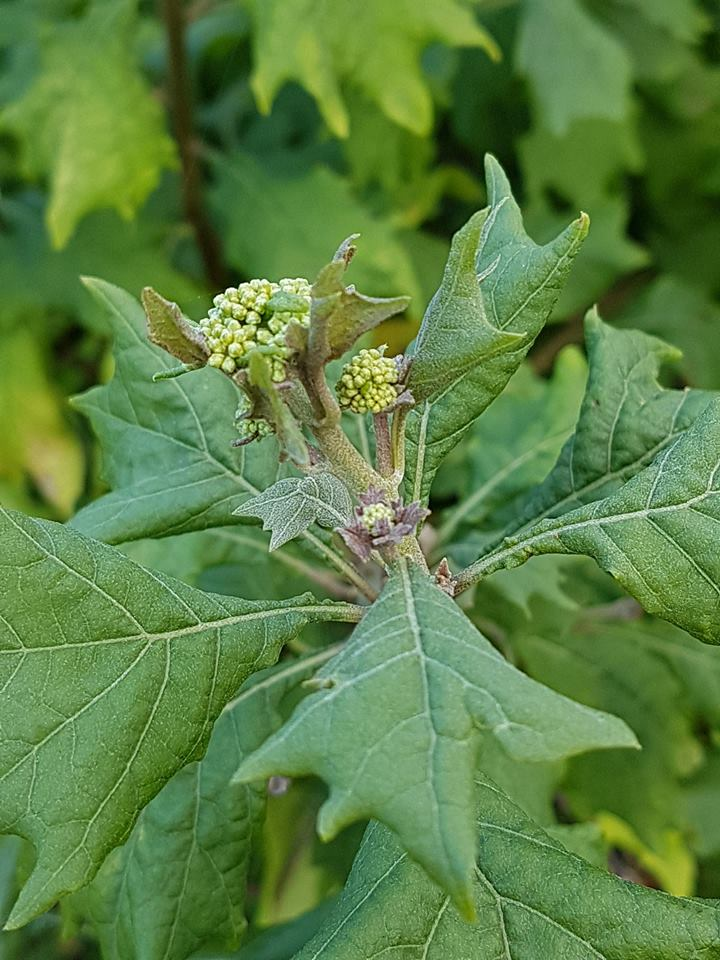

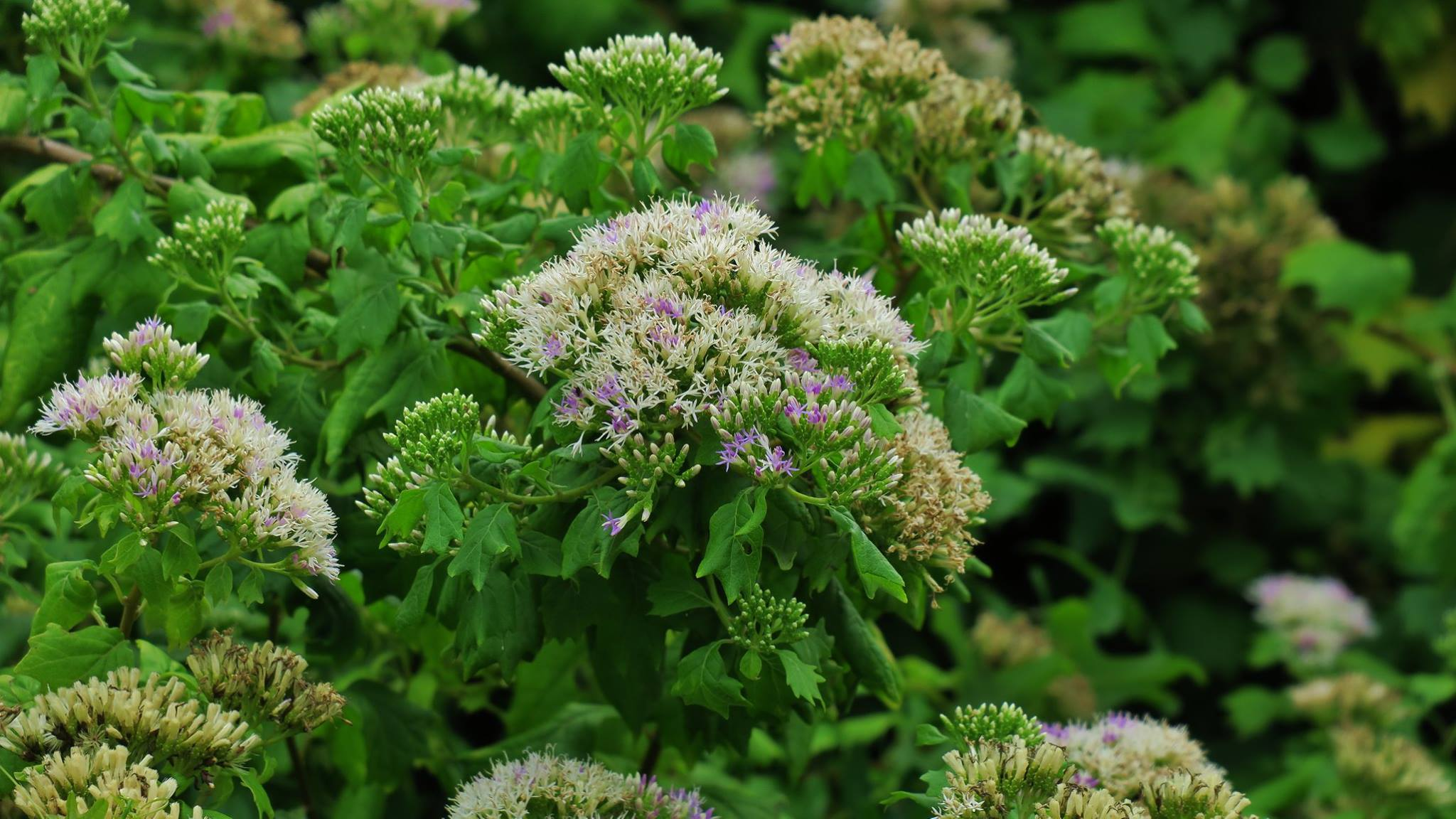
