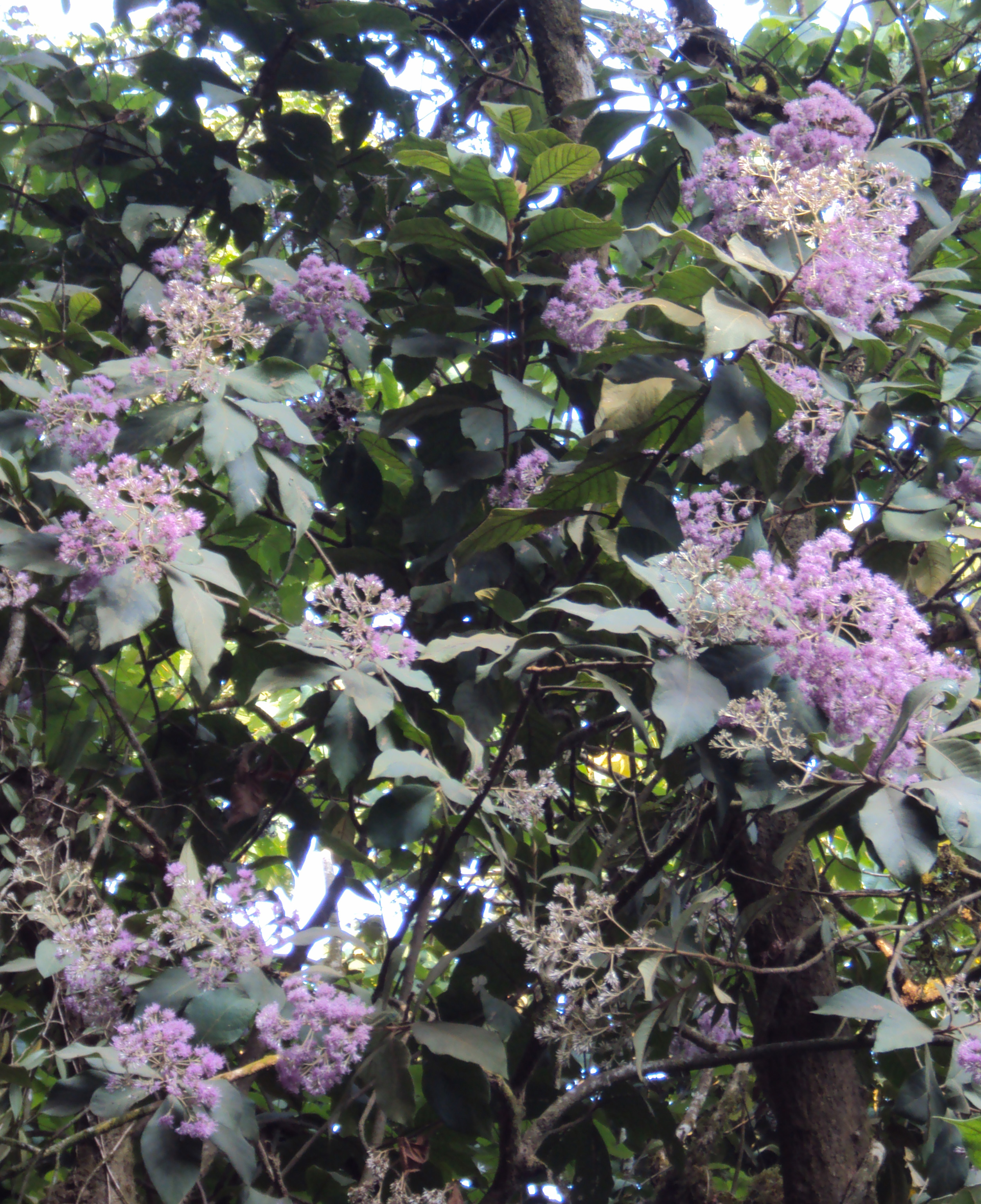
- Leaves and flowers

Scientific classification
- Kingdom: Plantae
- Clade: Tracheophytes
- Clade: Angiosperms
- Clade: Eudicots
- Clade: Asterids
- Order: Asterales
- Family: Asteraceae
- Genus: Strobocalyx
- Species: S. arborea

Binomial name
- Strobocalyx arborea (Buch.-Ham.) Sch.Bip.

Synonyms
- Vernonia arborea Buch.-Ham.; Conyza acuminata Wall. [Invalid]; Flustula tomentosa Raf. [Illegitimate]; Gymnanthemum acuminatum Steetz; Leucomeris glabra Blume ex DC. [Invalid]; Leucomeris javanica Blume ex DC. [Invalid]; Vernonia arborea var. arborea; Vernonia arborea var. blumeana (DC.) Koord. & Valeton; Vernonia arborea var. glabra Koord. & Valeton; Vernonia blumeana DC; Vernonia florescens Elmer; Vernonia urdanetense Elmer; Vernonia vaniotii H.Lév.; Vernonia wallichii Ridl.

= Strobocalyx arborea =

Species of flowering plant

Strobocalyx arborea, formerly widely known by the synonym Vernonia arborea, is a species of mid-level rainforest tree in the Composite, or Daisy family Asteraceae, that is found from the Western Ghats of India and Sri Lanka, east to the East Indies and New Guinea. This tree, and Brachylaena, are contenders for the tallest of all composite trees ("daisy trees"); plants on Sumatra (formerly distinguished as V. a. var. pilifera; locally called Maremboeng) reaching a height of 36 m (118 ft), and plants from Java (formerly distinguished as V. a. var. javanica; locally called Semboeng Kebo) can be almost as tall, to 34 m (112 ft), and at up to 104 cm (41 in) trunk diameter, is the most massive of all composites. Its leaves contain a useful fungicide. The leaves are alternate, ovate (but often asymmetrical), 8–25 cm long and 3–10 cm broad, with a leathery texture.
