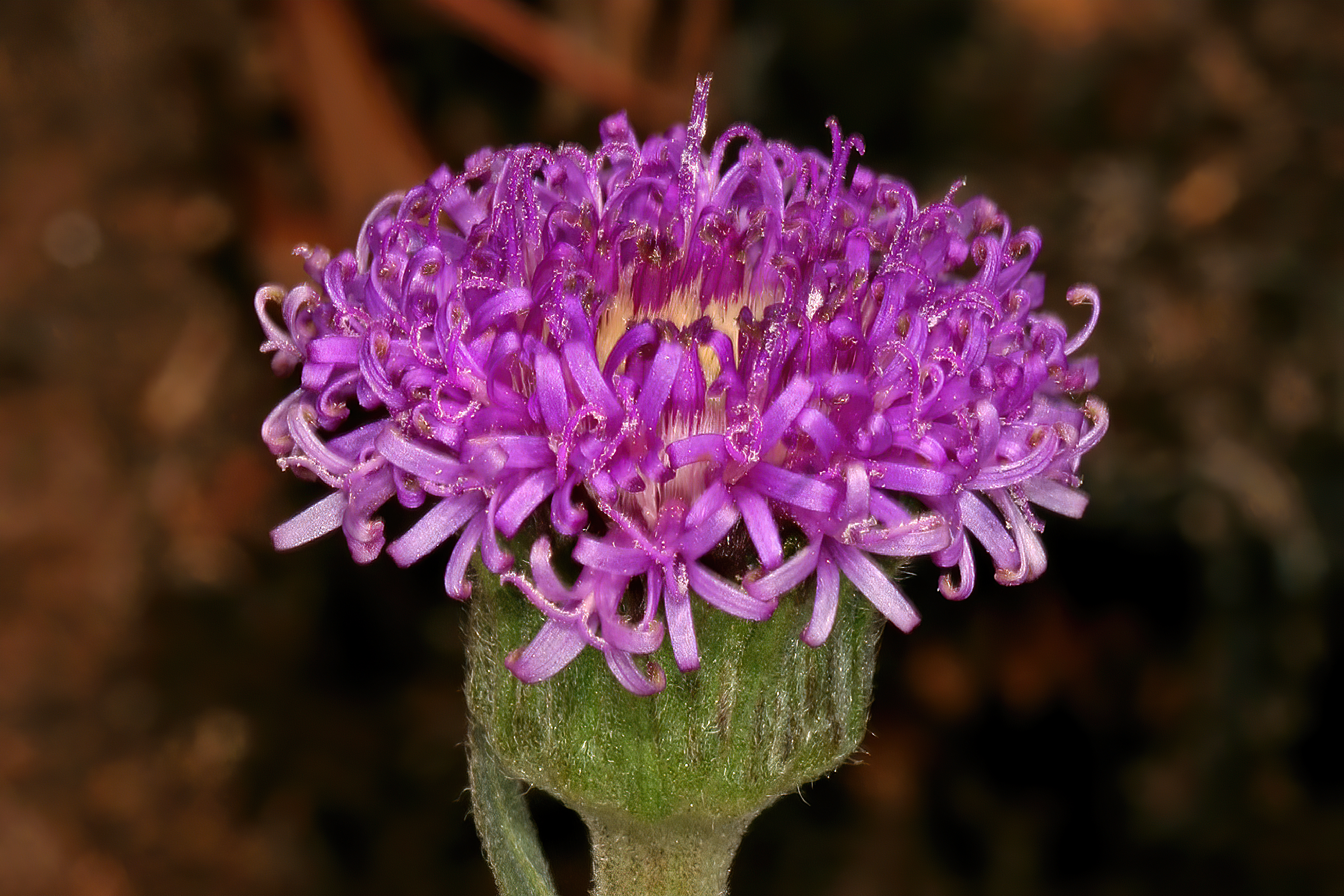

Scientific classification
- Kingdom: Plantae
- Clade: Tracheophytes
- Clade: Angiosperms
- Clade: Eudicots
- Clade: Asterids
- Order: Asterales
- Family: Asteraceae
- Genus: Pseudopegolettia; H.Rob., Skvarla & V.A.Funk

= Pseudopegolettia =

Genus of plants

Pseudopegolettia (/ˌsjuːdoʊpɪɡəˈlɛtiə/ SEW-doh-pig-ə-LET-ee-ə) is a genus of flowering plants belonging to the family Asteraceae.

Its native range is Southern Tropical and Southern Africa.

Species:

- Pseudopegolettia tenella (DC.) H.Rob., Skvarla & V.A.Funk
- Pseudopegolettia thodei (E.Phillips) H.Rob., Skvarla & V.A.Funk
