= Brenandendron frondosum =

Scientific classification
- Kingdom: Plantae
- Clade: Tracheophytes
- Clade: Angiosperms
- Clade: Eudicots
- Clade: Asterids
- Order: Asterales
- Family: Asteraceae
- Genus: Brenandendron
- Species: B. frondosum

Binomial name
- Brenandendron frondosum (Oliv. & Hiern) H.Rob.

Synonyms
- Cacalia frondosa Kuntze; Vernonia frondosa Oliv. & Hiern

Species of plant in the daisy family

Brenandendron frondosum (syn. Vernonia frondosa) is a species of flowering plant in the family Asteraceae, native to tropical Africa in Ivory Coast, Nigeria and Cameroon.

== Description ==
It grows as a shrub or small tree, measuring up to 6 m (20 ft) tall, with a trunk girth of about 30 cm (12 in). The sessile leaves measure up to 1 m (3 ft) long and 50 cm (20 in) wide. Inflorescences feature purple flowers.

== Distribution and habitat ==
Its habitat is in forest clearings.
