= Monosis =

Scientific classification
- Kingdom: Plantae
- Clade: Tracheophytes
- Clade: Angiosperms
- Clade: Eudicots
- Clade: Asterids
- Order: Asterales
- Family: Asteraceae
- Subfamily: Vernonioideae
- Tribe: Vernonieae
- Genus: Monosis; DC.

Type species
- Monosis wightiana DC.

Synonyms
- Punduana Steetz

Genus of flowering plants

Monosis is a genus of Asian plants in the tribe Vernonieae within the family Asteraceae.

== Species ==
- Monosis aplinii (Collett & Hemsl.) H.Rob. & Skvarla – India
- Monosis conferta (Benth.) C.Jeffrey – western tropical Africa to Uganda and Angola
- Monosis kannikattiensis (Rajakumar, Selvak., S.Murug. & Chellap.) Kottaim. – India (Tamil Nadu)
- Monosis parishii (Hook.f.) H.Rob. & Skvarla – Yunnan, Thailand, Laos, Vietnam, Myanmar
- Monosis talaumifolia (Hook.f. & Thomson ex C.B.Clarke) H.Rob. & Skvarla - Himalayas
- Monosis theophrastifolia (Schweinf. ex Oliv. & Hiern) C.Jeffrey – tropical Africa from Togo to Ethiopia and Zambia
- Monosis travancorica (Hook.f.) H.Rob. & Skvarla – India
- Monosis volkameriifolia (DC.) H.Rob. & Skvarla – Myanmar

formerly included

species now regarded as members of other genera: Critoniopsis Eremanthus Eremosis Gymnanthemum Vernonia

- Monosis brasiliensis - Eremanthus brasiliensis
- Monosis foliosa - Eremosis foliosa
- Monosis salicifolia - Critoniopsis salicifolia
- Monosis tarchonanthifolia - Eremosis tarchonanthifolia
- Monosis theophrastifolia - Gymnanthemum theophrastifolium
- Monosis tomentosa - Vernonia paniculata
- Monosis wightiana DC. - Strobocalyx wightiana (DC.) Sch.Bip.
