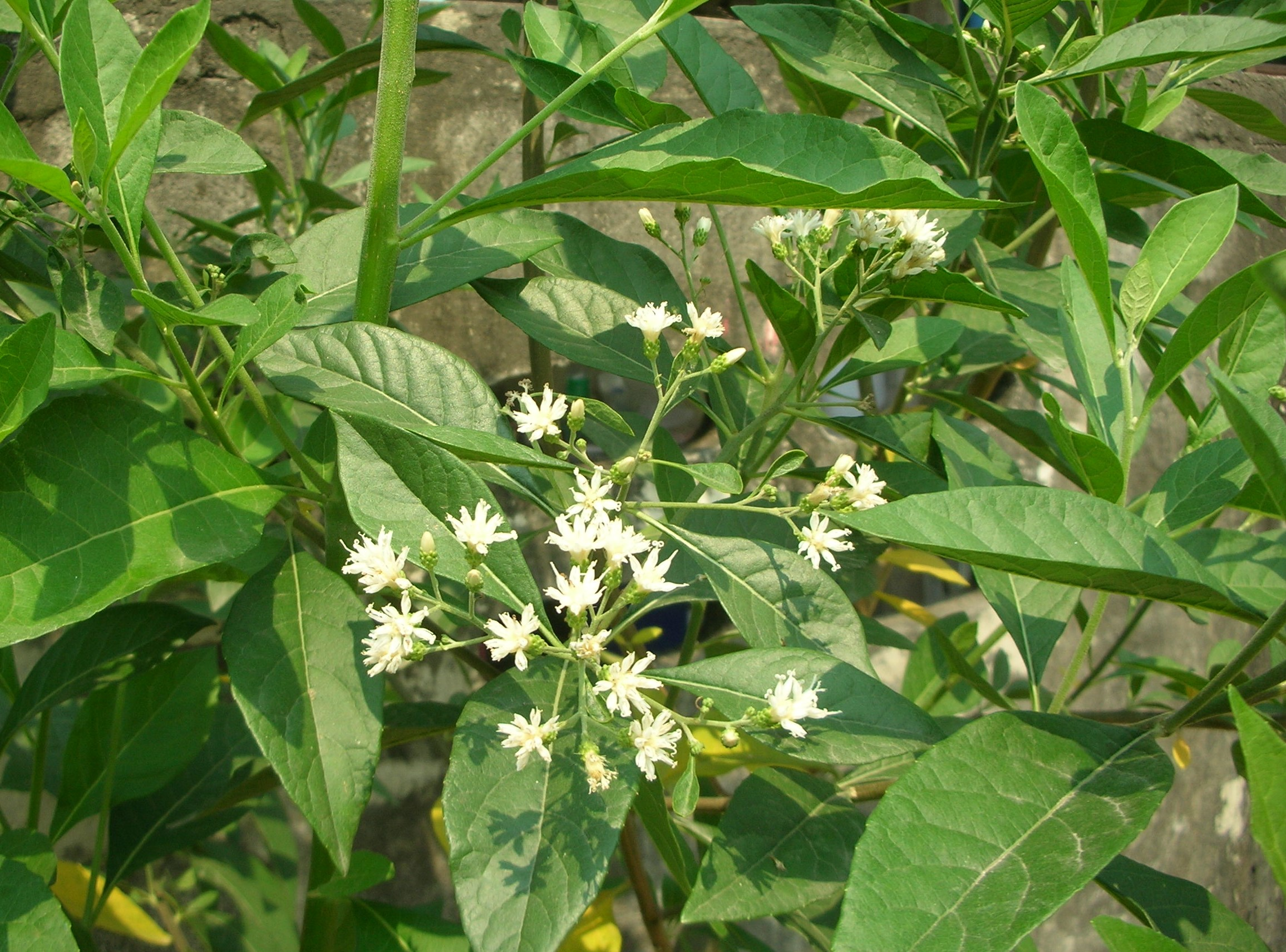
- Flowers

Scientific classification
- Kingdom: Plantae
- Clade: Tracheophytes
- Clade: Angiosperms
- Clade: Eudicots
- Clade: Asterids
- Order: Asterales
- Family: Asteraceae
- Genus: Gymnanthemum
- Species: G. extensum

Binomial name
- Gymnanthemum extensum (Wall. ex DC.) Steetz

Synonyms
- Vernonia extensa (Wall.) Wall. ex DC.; Cacalia extensa Kuntze; Conyza extensa Wall.

= Gymnanthemum extensum =

Species of shrub

Gymnanthemum extensum, also known as bitterleaf tree, Chinese: 展枝斑鸠菊 zhan zhi ban jiu ju, Thai: หนานเฉาเหว่ย nan chao woei, is a species of flowering shrub of the family Asteraceae. It is an up to 8 m shrub or small tree found naturally growing at 1,200 m (3,900 ft) to 2,100 m (6,900 ft) above sea level in open forests or thickets in slopes, valleys and by the roadside.

== Distribution ==
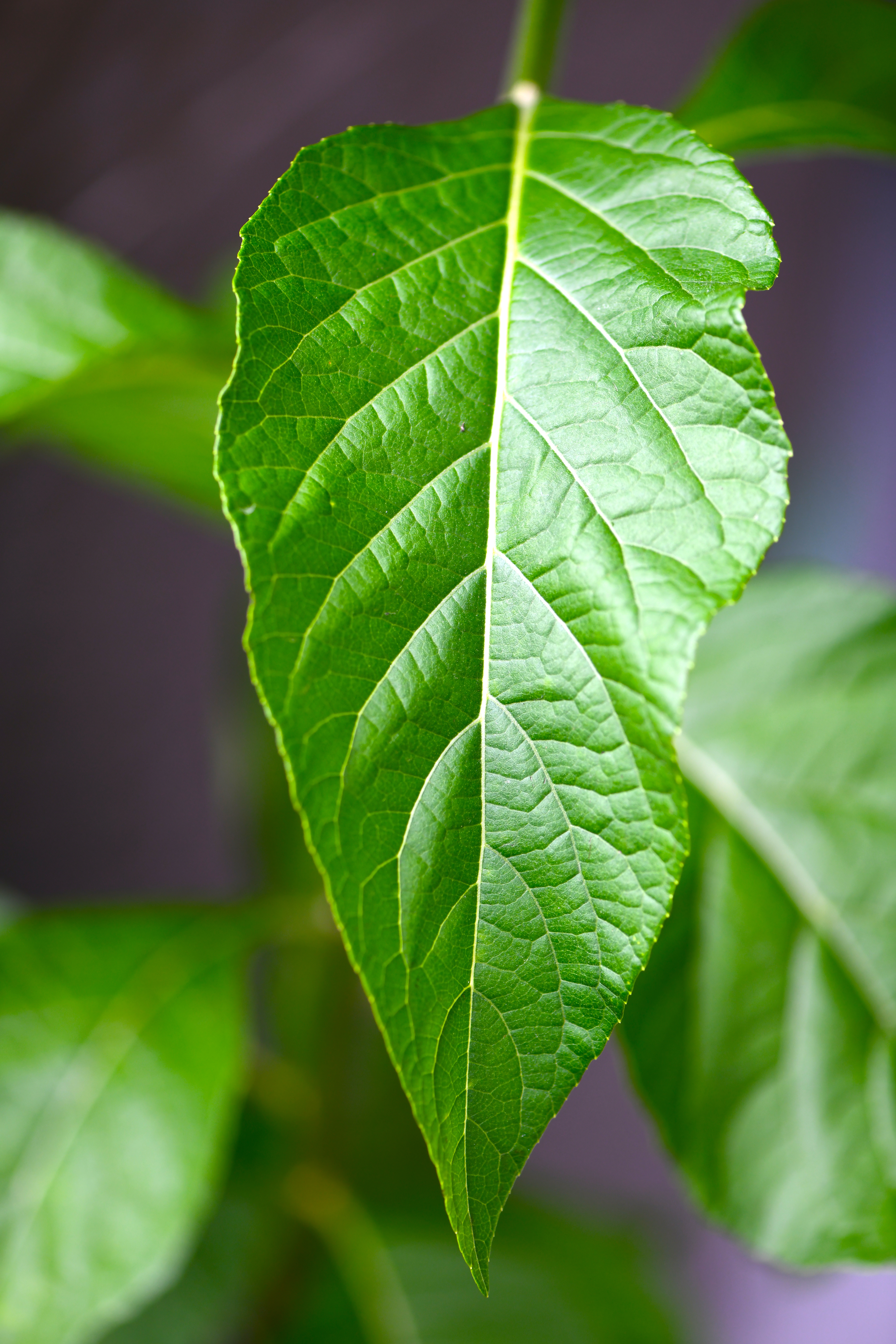
Leaf of a bitterleaf shrub

Southern China (Guizhou, Yunnan), the Himalayas (Sikkim, Nepal, Bhutan) and the Shan Hills (Myanmar, Thailand). It has been cultivated in Thailand as a garden tree for the medicinal properties of its leaves and the fragrance of its flowers.
