= Vernonia aosteana =

Scientific classification
- Kingdom: Plantae
- Clade: Tracheophytes
- Clade: Angiosperms
- Clade: Eudicots
- Clade: Asterids
- Order: Asterales
- Family: Asteraceae
- Genus: Vernonia
- Species: V. aosteana

Binomial name
- Vernonia aosteana Buscal. & Muschl.

Species of flowering plant

Vernonia aosteana is a species of perennial plant in the family Asteraceae. It is native to Zimbabwe.
