= Vernonia dewildemania =

Scientific classification
- Kingdom: Plantae
- Clade: Tracheophytes
- Clade: Angiosperms
- Clade: Eudicots
- Clade: Asterids
- Order: Asterales
- Family: Asteraceae
- Genus: Vernonia
- Species: V. dewildemania

Binomial name
- Vernonia dewildemania Muschl.

Synonyms
- Vernonia entohylea Wild; Vernonia verdickii O.Hoffm.

Species of flowering plant

Vernonia dewildemania is a species of plant in the family Asteraceae. It is native to Zambia and the Democratic Republic of the Congo.
