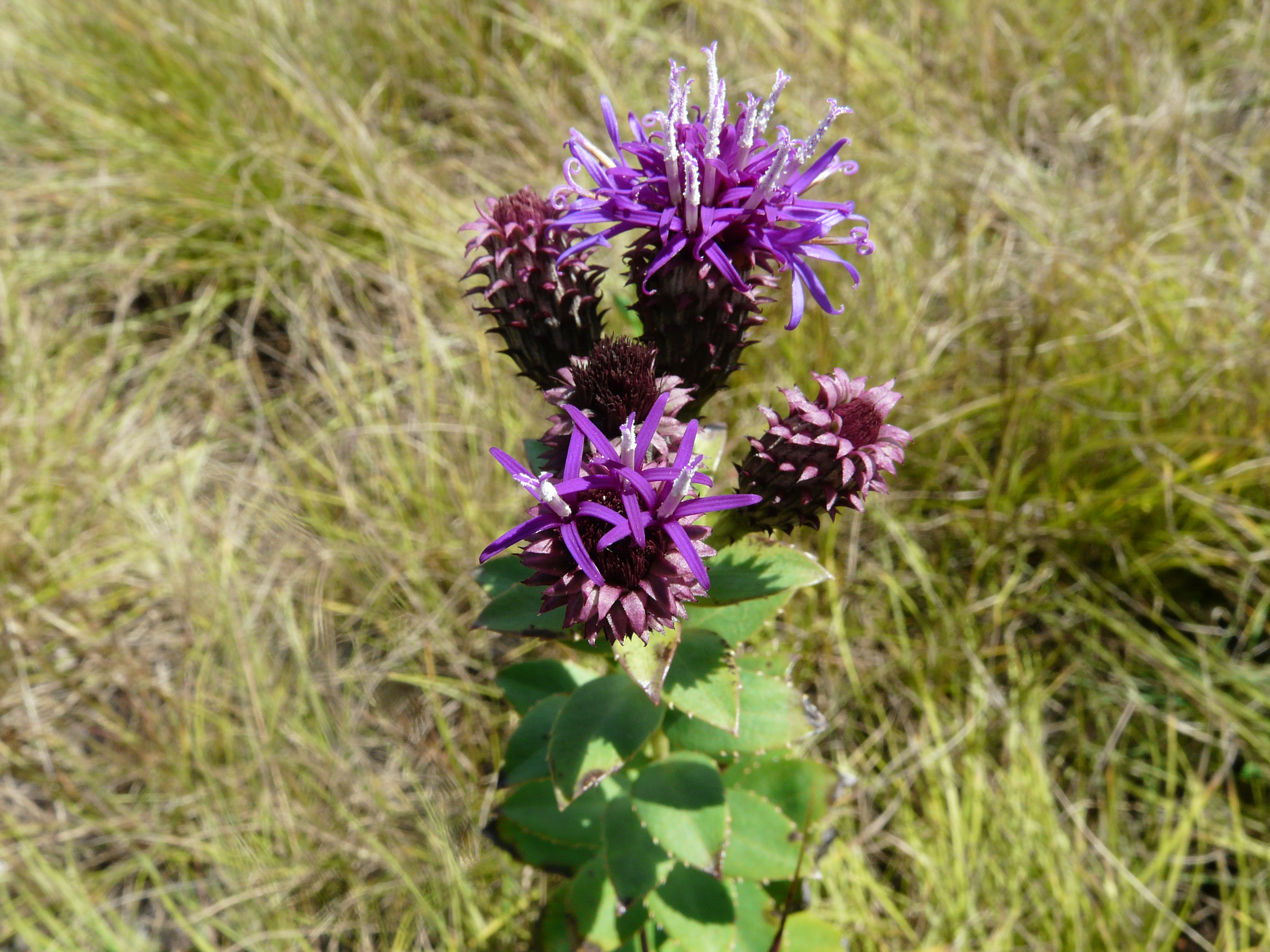

Conservation status
- Critically Endangered (IUCN 3.1)

Scientific classification
- Kingdom: Plantae
- Clade: Tracheophytes
- Clade: Angiosperms
- Clade: Eudicots
- Clade: Asterids
- Order: Asterales
- Family: Asteraceae
- Genus: Vernonia
- Species: V. djalonensis

Binomial name
- Vernonia djalonensis A.Chev.

= Vernonia djalonensis =

Species of flowering plant

Vernonia djalonensis is a critically endangered species of plants in the family Asteraceae. It is native to the West African country of Guinea.

In a 2018 public vote, Vernonia djalonensis was voted as the national flower of Guinea, a decision which is currently awaiting government approval.
