= Vernonia verrucata =

Scientific classification
- Kingdom: Plantae
- Clade: Tracheophytes
- Clade: Angiosperms
- Clade: Eudicots
- Clade: Asterids
- Order: Asterales
- Family: Asteraceae
- Genus: Vernonia
- Species: V. verrucata

Binomial name
- Vernonia verrucata Klatt

Synonyms
- Cacalia chlorolepis (S.Moore) Kuntze; Vernonia chlorolepis S.Moore

Species of flowering plant

Vernonia verrucata is a species of flowering plant in the family Asteraceae. It is native to Angola and Zambia. It can grow up to 75 cm with stems, usually purple that are uniformly leafy, glabrous.
