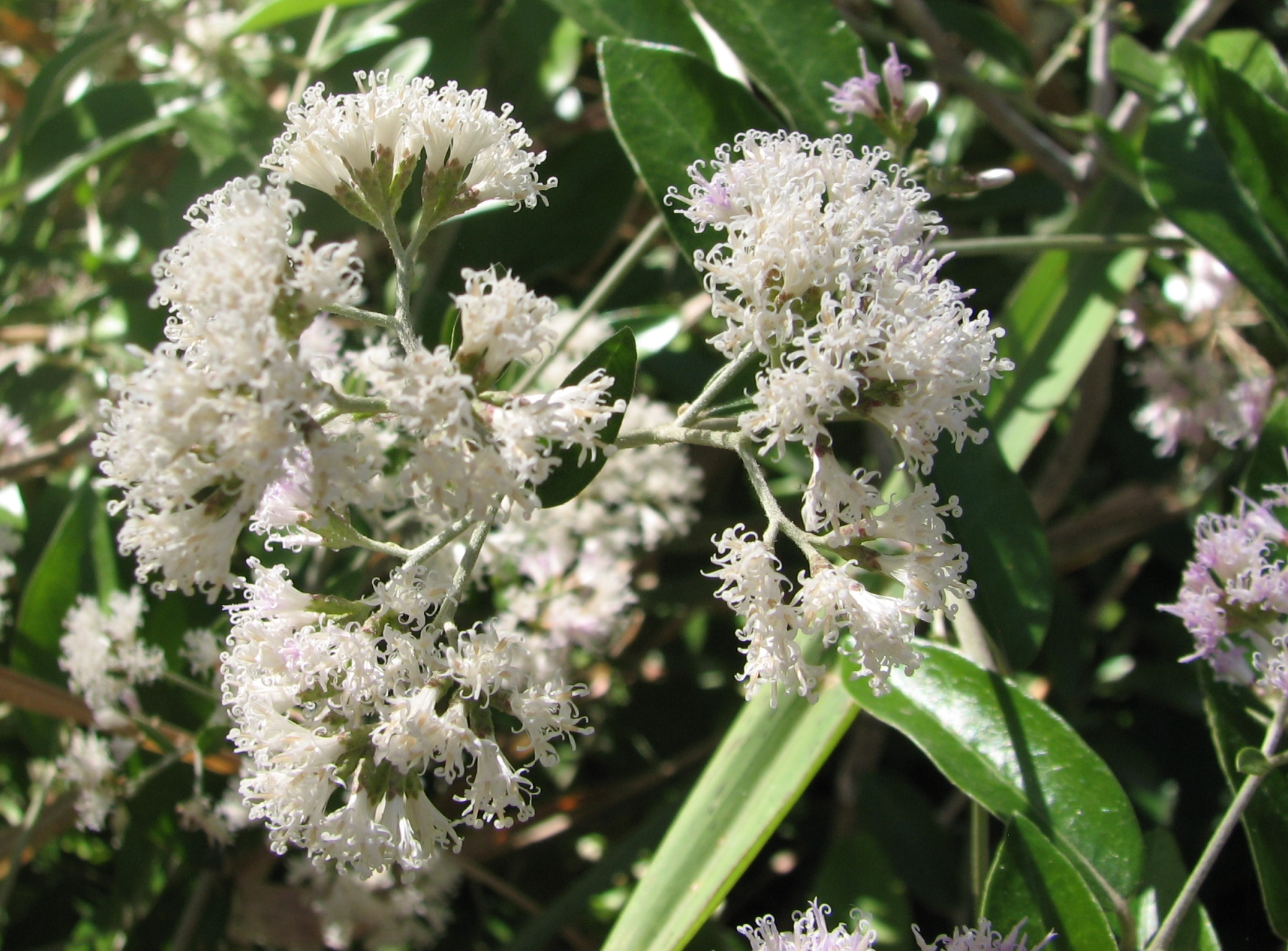

Scientific classification
- Kingdom: Plantae
- Clade: Tracheophytes
- Clade: Angiosperms
- Clade: Eudicots
- Clade: Asterids
- Order: Asterales
- Family: Asteraceae
- Subfamily: Cichorioideae
- Tribe: Vernonieae
- Genus: Tarlmounia; H.Rob., S.C.Keeley, Skvarla & R.Chan
- Species: T. elliptica

Binomial name
- Tarlmounia elliptica (DC.) H.Rob., S.C.Keeley, Skvarla & R.Chan

Synonyms
- Cacalia elaeagnifolia Kuntze; Strobocalyx elaeagnifolia (DC.) Sch.Bip.; Strobocalyx elliptica (DC.) Sch.Bip.; Vernonia elaeagnifolia DC.; Vernonia elliptica DC.

= Tarlmounia =

Genus of plants

Tarlmounia is a plant genus in the family Asteraceae. The sole species is Tarlmounia elliptica (syn. Vernonia elliptica and V. elaeagnifolia), native to India, Burma and Thailand and naturalised in southern Taiwan and Queensland, Australia. Common names include curtain creeper, vernonia creeper and parda bel.
