= Vernonia anamallica =

Scientific classification
- Kingdom: Plantae
- Clade: Tracheophytes
- Clade: Angiosperms
- Clade: Eudicots
- Clade: Asterids
- Order: Asterales
- Family: Asteraceae
- Genus: Vernonia
- Species: V. anamallica

Binomial name
- Vernonia anamallica Bedd. ex Gamble

Species of flowering plant

Vernonia anamallica is a species of perennial plant from family Asteraceae. It is endemic to India.
