= Vernonia ampandrandavensis =

Conservation status
- Critically endangered, possibly extinct (IUCN 3.1)

Scientific classification
- Kingdom: Plantae
- Clade: Tracheophytes
- Clade: Angiosperms
- Clade: Eudicots
- Clade: Asterids
- Order: Asterales
- Family: Asteraceae
- Genus: Vernonia
- Species: V. ampandrandavensis

Binomial name
- Vernonia ampandrandavensis Humbert

Species of flowering plant

Vernonia ampandrandavensis is a species of perennial plant in the family Asteraceae. It is endemic to Madagascar.
