= Brenandendron =

Scientific classification
- Kingdom: Plantae
- Clade: Tracheophytes
- Clade: Angiosperms
- Clade: Eudicots
- Clade: Asterids
- Order: Asterales
- Family: Asteraceae
- Subfamily: Vernonioideae
- Tribe: Vernonieae
- Genus: Brenandendron; H.Rob.

Species
- See text

Genus of plants in the daisy family

Brenandendron is a genus of plants in the family Asteraceae, native to tropical Africa. The genus is named for the British botanist John Patrick Micklethwait Brenan and its species were formerly placed in the genus Vernonia.

== Species ==
As of September 2020, Plants of the World Online recognises the following species:

- Brenandendron donianum (DC.) H.Rob.
- Brenandendron frondosum (Oliv. & Hiern) H.Rob.
- Brenandendron titanophyllum (Brenan) H.Rob.
