= Vernonia brazzavillensis =

Scientific classification
- Kingdom: Plantae
- Clade: Tracheophytes
- Clade: Angiosperms
- Clade: Eudicots
- Clade: Asterids
- Order: Asterales
- Family: Asteraceae
- Genus: Vernonia
- Species: V. brazzavillensis

Binomial name
- Vernonia brazzavillensis Aubrév. ex Compère

Species of flowering plant

Vernonia brazzavillensis is a species of perennial plant in the family Asteraceae. It is endemic to The Republic of the Congo and the Democratic Republic of Congo.
