= Vernonia amoena =

Scientific classification
- Kingdom: Plantae
- Clade: Tracheophytes
- Clade: Angiosperms
- Clade: Eudicots
- Clade: Asterids
- Order: Asterales
- Family: Asteraceae
- Genus: Vernonia
- Species: V. amoena

Binomial name
- Vernonia amoena S.Moore

Species of flowering plant

Vernonia amoena is a species of annual, flowering plant in the family Asteraceae. It is endemic to Zambia and Zimbabwe. It grows up to 110 cm (43 in) tall. The leaves are sessile, growing 4 to 15 cm (1.6 to 5.9 in) long and 1 to 6 cm (0.39 to 2.36 in) across. The flowers may be blueish purple or white.
