= Vernonia bontocensis =

Scientific classification
- Kingdom: Plantae
- Clade: Tracheophytes
- Clade: Angiosperms
- Clade: Eudicots
- Clade: Asterids
- Order: Asterales
- Family: Asteraceae
- Genus: Vernonia
- Species: V. bontocensis

Binomial name
- Vernonia bontocensis Merr

Species of flowering plant

Vernonia bontocensis is a species of perennial plant in the family Asteraceae. It is endemic to the Philippines.
