= Vernonia coerulea =

Scientific classification
- Kingdom: Plantae
- Clade: Tracheophytes
- Clade: Angiosperms
- Clade: Eudicots
- Clade: Asterids
- Order: Asterales
- Family: Asteraceae
- Genus: Vernonia
- Species: V. coerulea

Binomial name
- Vernonia coerulea J.Kost.

Species of flowering plant

Vernonia coerulea is a species of perennial plant in the family Asteraceae. It is endemic to the Lesser Sunda Islands.
