= Pseudopegolettia thodei =

Scientific classification
- Kingdom: Plantae
- Clade: Tracheophytes
- Clade: Angiosperms
- Clade: Eudicots
- Clade: Asterids
- Order: Asterales
- Family: Asteraceae
- Genus: Pseudopegolettia
- Species: P. thodei

Binomial name
- Pseudopegolettia thodei (E.Phillips) H.Rob., Skvarla & V.A.Funk

Synonyms
- Vernonia collina Schltr.; Vernonia thodei E.Phillips

Species of flowering plant

Pseudopegolettia thodei is a species of plant in the family Asteraceae. It is native to the Free State, KwaZulu-Natal, and Northern Provinces of South Africa.
