= Vernonia duvigneaudii =

Scientific classification
- Kingdom: Plantae
- Clade: Embryophytes
- Clade: Tracheophytes
- Clade: Spermatophytes
- Clade: Angiosperms
- Clade: Eudicots
- Clade: Asterids
- Order: Asterales
- Family: Asteraceae
- Genus: Vernonia
- Species: V. duvigneaudii

Binomial name
- Vernonia duvigneaudii Kalanda

Species of flowering plant

Vernonia duvigneaudii is a species of flowering plant in the family Asteraceae. It is native to Congo.
