= Vernonia alleizettei =

Scientific classification
- Kingdom: Plantae
- Clade: Tracheophytes
- Clade: Angiosperms
- Clade: Eudicots
- Clade: Asterids
- Order: Asterales
- Family: Asteraceae
- Genus: Vernonia
- Species: V. alleizettei

Binomial name
- Vernonia alleizettei Humbert

Species of flowering plant

Vernonia alleizettei is a species of flowering plant in the family Asteraceae. It is endemic to Madagascar.

Four varieties are accepted:

- Vernonia alleizettei var. alleizettei – isotype collected in 1948
- Vernonia alleizettei var. hirtella
- Vernonia alleizettei var. moramangensis
- Vernonia alleizettei var. rienanensis – holotype was collected in 1924 at "Centre (confins Est), haute vallée de la Rienana (bassin du Matitanana)"
