= Vernonia dranensis =

Scientific classification
- Kingdom: Plantae
- Clade: Tracheophytes
- Clade: Angiosperms
- Clade: Eudicots
- Clade: Asterids
- Order: Asterales
- Family: Asteraceae
- Genus: Vernonia
- Species: V. dranensis

Binomial name
- Vernonia dranensis S.Moore

Species of flowering plant

Vernonia dranensis is a species of flowering plant in the family Asteraceae. It is native to Vietnam.
