= Parapolydora gerrardii =

Scientific classification
- Kingdom: Plantae
- Clade: Tracheophytes
- Clade: Angiosperms
- Clade: Eudicots
- Clade: Asterids
- Order: Asterales
- Family: Asteraceae
- Genus: Parapolydora
- Species: P. gerrardii

Binomial name
- Parapolydora gerrardii (Harv.) H.Rob., Skvarla & V.A.Funk

Synonyms
- Cacalia gerrardii (Harv.) Kuntze; Vernonia gerrardii Harv.

Species of plant

Parapolydora gerrardii is a species of flowering plant in the family Asteraceae. It is endemic to KwaZulu-Natal in South Africa.
