= Vernonia schweinfurthii =

Scientific classification
- Kingdom: Plantae
- Clade: Tracheophytes
- Clade: Angiosperms
- Clade: Eudicots
- Clade: Asterids
- Order: Asterales
- Family: Asteraceae
- Genus: Vernonia
- Species: V. schweinfurthii

Binomial name
- Vernonia schweinfurthii Oliv. & Hiern

Synonyms
- Cacalia schweinfurthii Kuntze; Vernonia asterifolia Baker; Vernonia katangensis O.Hoffm.

Species of flowering plant

Vernonia schweinfurthii is a species of flowering plant in the family Asteraceae. It is native to Angola, Burundi, Cameroon, Central African Repu, Ivory Coast, Malawi, Nigeria, Rwanda, Sudan, Zambia. One subspecies is recognized: Vernonia schweinfurthii var. bukamaensis.

The herb grows from 6 to 30 centimeter with a tall woody rootstock. Its leaves are linear and elliptic to oblong elliptic, and sizes from 05 to 0.8 centimeters. Its corolla are mauve or purple and stretches from 5 to 11 mm.
