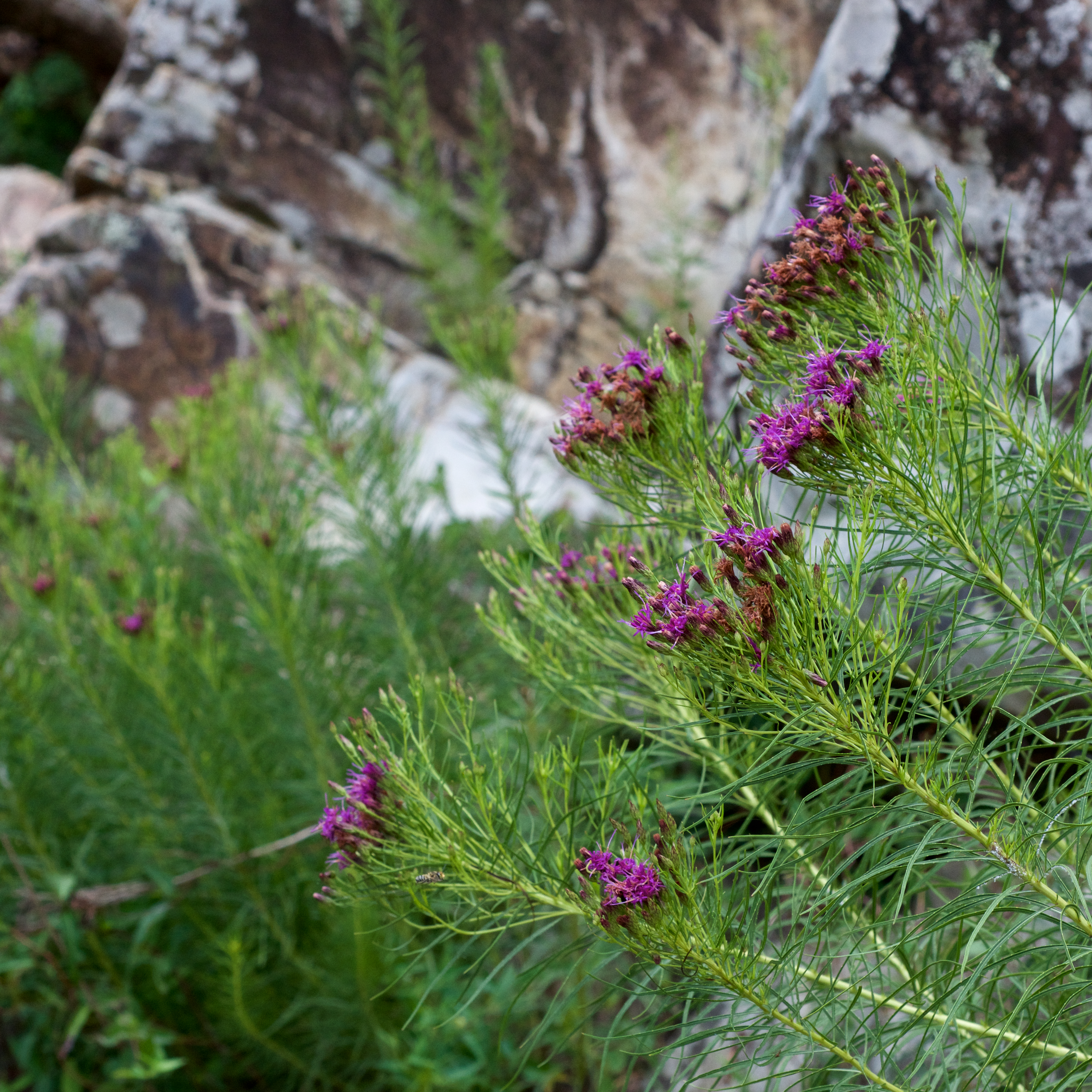

Scientific classification
- Kingdom: Plantae
- Clade: Tracheophytes
- Clade: Angiosperms
- Clade: Eudicots
- Clade: Asterids
- Order: Asterales
- Family: Asteraceae
- Genus: Vernonia
- Species: V. lettermannii

Binomial name
- Vernonia lettermannii Engelm. ex A. Gray

Synonyms
- Cacalia lettermannii (Engelm. ex A. Gray) Kuntze

= Vernonia lettermannii =

Species of flowering plant

Vernonia lettermannii, the narrowleaf ironweed, is a plant species known only from Arkansas and Oklahoma. It grows on floodplains and terraces at elevations of 100–200 m (330–660 ft).

Vernonia lettermannii is a perennial herb up to 60 cm (24 in) tall. Leaves are filiform (thread-shaped), up to 9 cm (3.5 in) long but less than 3 mm (0.12 in) wide. Flower heads are purple, arranged as a corymb.
