= Vernonia actaea =

Scientific classification
- Kingdom: Plantae
- Clade: Tracheophytes
- Clade: Angiosperms
- Clade: Eudicots
- Clade: Asterids
- Order: Asterales
- Family: Asteraceae
- Genus: Vernonia
- Species: V. actaea

Binomial name
- Vernonia actaea J.Kost.

Species of flowering plant

Vernonia actaea is a species of perennial plant in the family Asteraceae. It is endemic to Sulawesi.
