= Brenandendron donianum =

Conservation status
- Least Concern (IUCN 3.1)

Scientific classification
- Kingdom: Plantae
- Clade: Tracheophytes
- Clade: Angiosperms
- Clade: Eudicots
- Clade: Asterids
- Order: Asterales
- Family: Asteraceae
- Genus: Brenandendron
- Species: B. donianum

Binomial name
- Brenandendron donianum (DC.) H.Rob.

Synonyms
- Cacalia doniana Kuntze; Eupatorium paniculatum Lindl. ex DC.; Strobocalyx doniana Sch.Bip.; Vernonia andohii C.D.Adams; Vernonia doniana DC.

Species of plant in the daisy family

Brenandendron donianum is a plant in the family Asteraceae, native to West and West-Central Africa.

== Description ==
Brenandendron donianum grows as a shrub or tree, measuring 6–30 feet (2–9 m) tall. Its branches and inflorescences are pubescent. The inflorescences feature white or purple flowers.

== Distribution and habitat ==
Brenandendron donianum is native to an area from Guinea to the Democratic Republic of the Congo. Its habitat is in forests.
