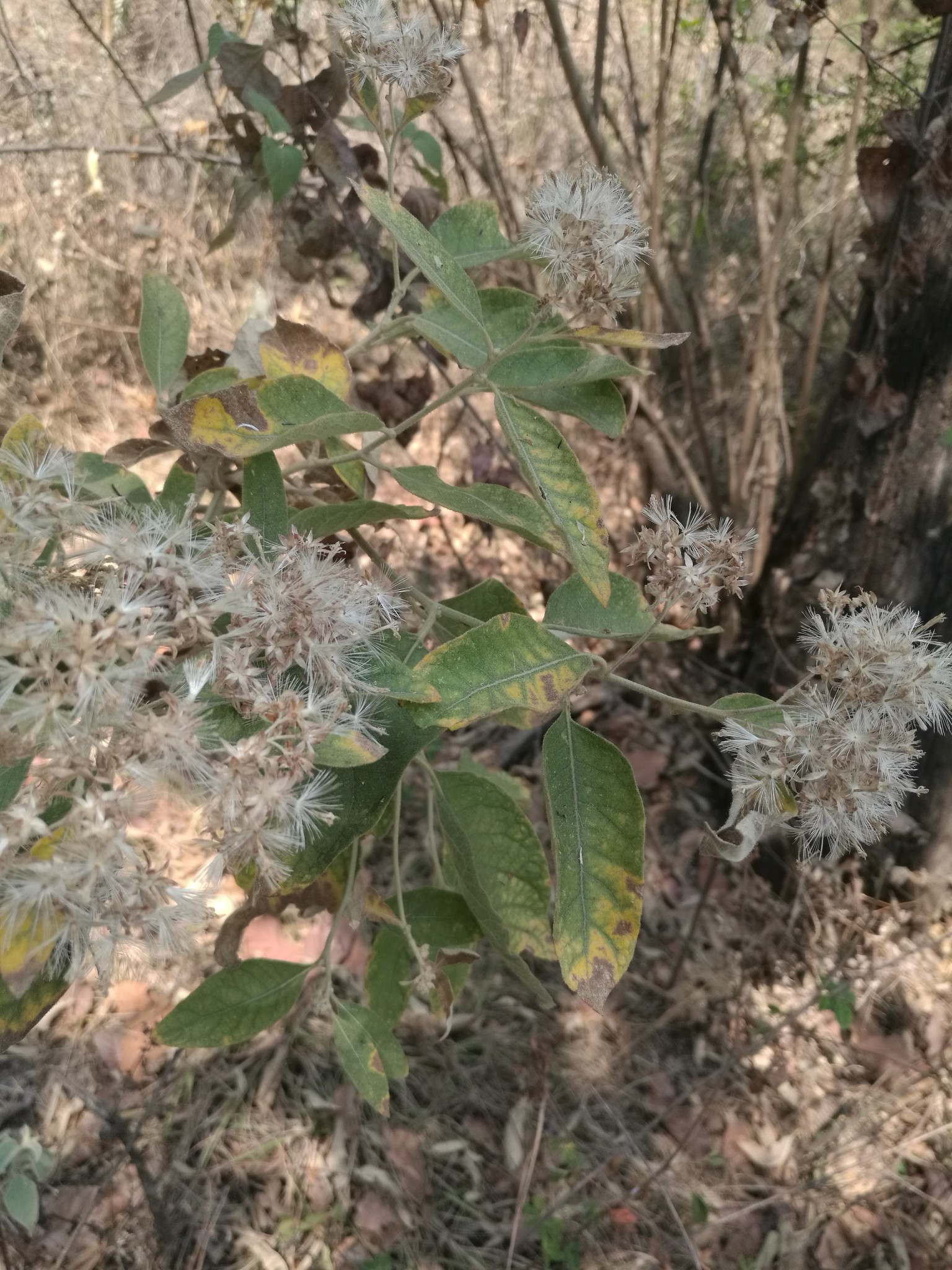
- Eremosis tomentosa

Scientific classification
- Kingdom: Plantae
- Clade: Embryophytes
- Clade: Tracheophytes
- Clade: Angiosperms
- Clade: Eudicots
- Clade: Asterids
- Order: Asterales
- Family: Asteraceae
- Subfamily: Vernonioideae
- Tribe: Vernonieae
- Genus: Eremosis (DC.) Gleason

Type species
- Eremosis salicifolia (DC.) Gleason

Synonyms
- Monosis sect. Eremosis DC.; Vernonia sect. Eremosis (DC.) Benth. & Hook. f.; Seneciodes sect. Eremosis (DC.) Kuntze

= Eremosis =

Genus of flowering plants

Eremosis is a genus of flowering plants in the family Asteraceae.

Species

- Eremosis heydeana (J.M.Coult.) Gleason - Oaxaca, Chiapas, Guatemala
- Eremosis leiocarpa (DC.) Gleason - Chiapas, Guatemala, Belize, Honduras, El Salvador, Nicaragua
- Eremosis littoralis Gleason - Colima
- Eremosis oolepis (S.F.Blake) Gleason - Yucatán, Quintana Roo
- Eremosis pallens (Sch.Bip.) Gleason - Chiapas, México State, Morelos, Guerrero, Nayarit
- Eremosis shannonii Gleason - Chiapas, Guatemala
- Eremosis tarchonanthifolia (DC.) Gleason - Oaxaca
- Eremosis tomentosa (La Llave & Lex.) Gleason - Michoacán, Morelos, Mexico State
- Eremosis triflosculosa (Kunth) Gleason - Chiapas, El Salvador
