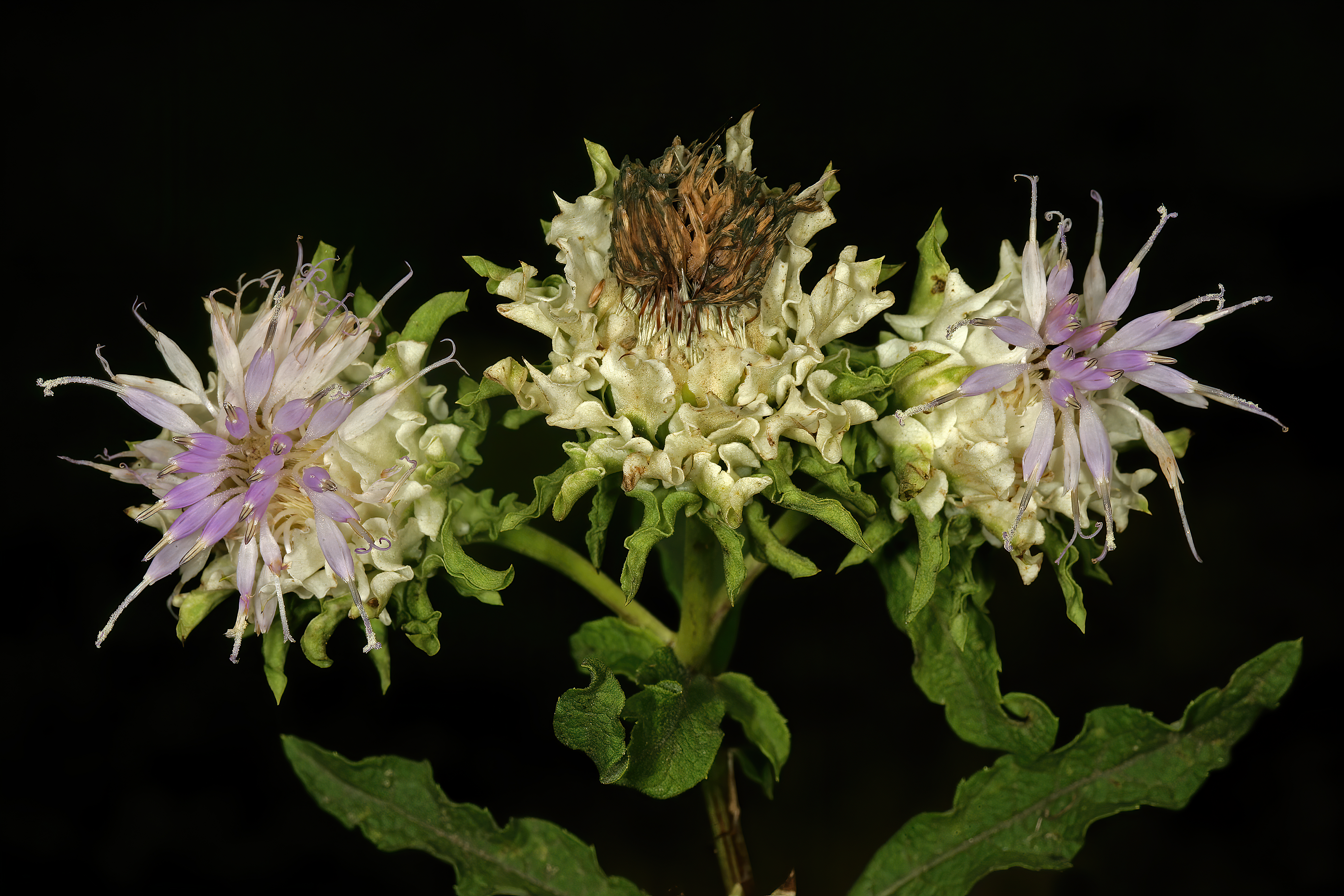
- Baccharoides adoensis in South Africa

Scientific classification
- Kingdom: Plantae
- Clade: Tracheophytes
- Clade: Angiosperms
- Clade: Eudicots
- Clade: Asterids
- Order: Asterales
- Family: Asteraceae
- Subfamily: Vernonioideae
- Tribe: Vernonieae
- Genus: Baccharoides; Moench

Type species
- Conyza anthelmintica L.

Synonyms
- Ascaricida Cass.; Ascaridia Rchb.; Candidea Ten.; Dolosanthus Klatt; Stengelia (Walp.) Sch.Bip. ex Steetz; Vernonia sect. Stengelia (Sch.Bip. ex Walp.); Vernonia sect. Baccharoides (L. ex Moench) Moench ex Gleason

= Baccharoides =

Genus of flowering plants

Baccharoides is a genus of Asian and African plants in the tribe Vernonieae within the family Asteraceae.

== Species ==
- Baccharoides adoensis (Sch.Bip. ex Walp.) H.Rob.
- Baccharoides anthelmintica (L.) Moench
- Baccharoides ballyi (C.Jeffrey) Isawumi, El-Ghazaly & B.Nord.
- Baccharoides bracteosa (O.Hoffm.) Isawumi, El-Ghazaly & B.Nord.
- Baccharoides calvoana (Hook.f.) Isawumi, El-Ghazaly & B.Nord.
- Baccharoides cardiolepis (O.Hoffm.) Isawumi, El-Ghazaly & B.Nord.
- Baccharoides dumicola (S.Moore) Isawumi, El-Ghazaly & B.Nord.
- Baccharoides filigera (Oliv. & Hiern) Isawumi, El-Ghazaly & B.Nord.
- Baccharoides filipendula (Hiern) Isawumi, El-Ghazaly & B.Nord.
- Baccharoides guineensis (Benth.) H.Rob.
- Baccharoides hymenolepis (A.Rich.) Isawumi, El-Ghazaly & B.Nord.
- Baccharoides incompta (S.Moore) Isawumi, El-Ghazaly & B.Nord.
- Baccharoides kirungae (R.E.Fr.) Isawumi, El-Ghazaly & B.Nord.
- Baccharoides lasiopus (O.Hoffm.) H.Rob.
- Baccharoides longipedunculata (De Wild.) Isawumi, El-Ghazaly & B.Nord.
- Baccharoides nimbaensis (C.D.Adams) Isawumi, El-Ghazaly & B.Nord.
- Baccharoides prolixa (S.Moore) Isawumi, El-Ghazaly & B.Nord.
- Baccharoides pumila (Kotschy & Peyr.) Isawumi
- Baccharoides ringoetii (De Wild.) Isawumi, El-Ghazaly & B.Nord.
- Baccharoides schimperi (DC.) Isawumi, El-Ghazaly & B.Nord.
- Baccharoides sunzuensis (Wild) Isawumi, El-Ghazaly & B.Nord.
- Baccharoides tayloriana Isawumi
- Baccharoides tenoreana (Oliv.) Isawumi

== Formerly included ==
several species once regarded as members of Baccharoides but now considered better suited to other genera: Centratherum Hololepis Lepidaploa Lessingianthus Phyllocephalum Pluchea Vernonia
