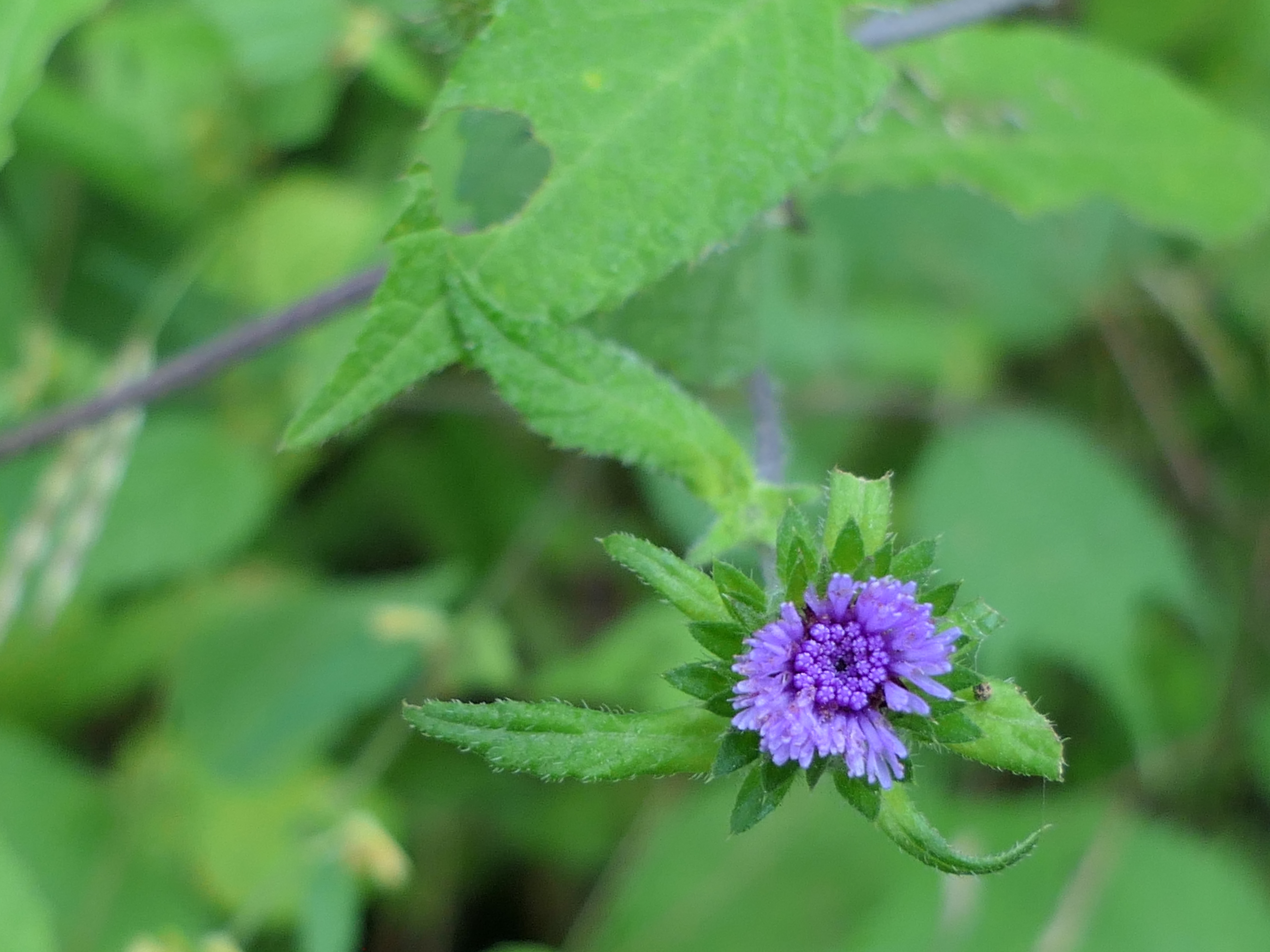
- Phyllocephalum scabridum

Scientific classification
- Kingdom: Plantae
- Clade: Tracheophytes
- Clade: Angiosperms
- Clade: Eudicots
- Clade: Asterids
- Order: Asterales
- Family: Asteraceae
- Subfamily: Cichorioideae
- Tribe: Vernonieae
- Genus: Phyllocephalum; Blume

Type species
- Phyllocephalum frutescens Blume

Synonyms
- Decaneurum sect. Phyllocephalum (Blume) DC.; Decaneurum DC. ex Wight; Lamprachaenium Benth.

= Phyllocephalum =

Genus of flowering plants

Phyllocephalum is a genus of Asian flowering plants in the tribe Vernonieae within the family Asteraceae.

Species

- Phyllocephalum frutescens Blume
- Phyllocephalum hookeri (C.B.Clarke) Uniyal
- Phyllocephalum indicum (Less.) K.Kirkman
- Phyllocephalum lilacinum (Dalzell & A.Gibson) S.M.Almeida & M.R.Almeida
- Phyllocephalum mayurii (C.E.C.Fisch.) Narayana
- Phyllocephalum microcephalum (Dalzell) H.Rob.
- Phyllocephalum phyllolaenum (DC.) Narayana
- Phyllocephalum rangacharii (Gamble) Narayana
- Phyllocephalum ritchiei (Hook.f.) Narayana
- Phyllocephalum scabridum (DC.) K.Kirkman
- Phyllocephalum sengaltherianum (Narayana) Narayana
- Phyllocephalum tenue (C.B.Clarke) Narayama

formerly included

see Baccharoides

- Phyllocephalum anthelminticum (L.) S.R.Paul & S.L.Kapoor - Baccharoides anthelmintica (L.) Moench
