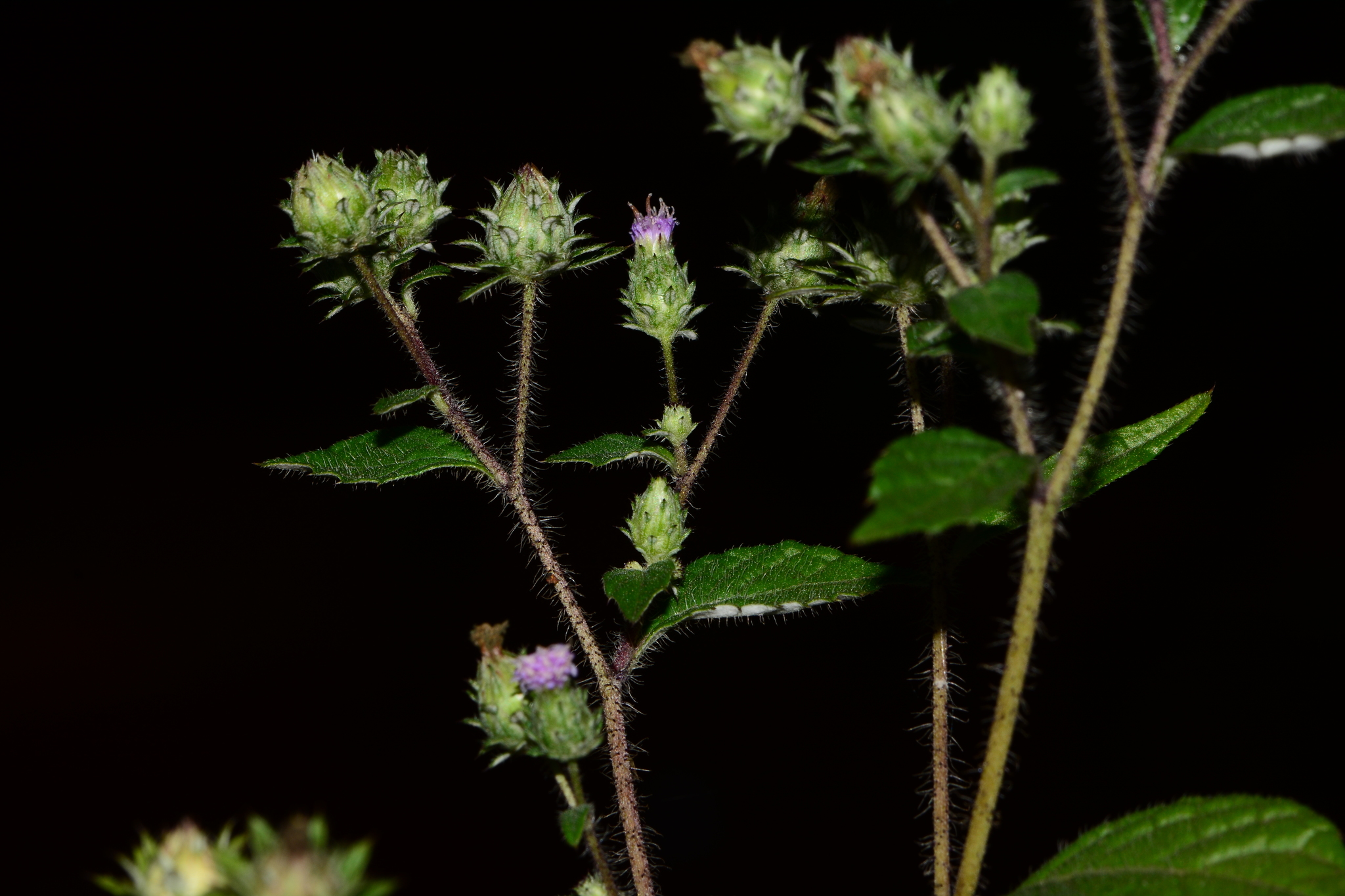

Scientific classification
- Kingdom: Plantae
- Clade: Tracheophytes
- Clade: Angiosperms
- Clade: Eudicots
- Clade: Asterids
- Order: Asterales
- Family: Asteraceae
- Genus: Phyllocephalum
- Species: P. microcephalum

Binomial name
- Phyllocephalum microcephalum (Dalzell) H.Rob.

Synonyms
- Decaneurum microcephalum Dalzell; Lamprachaenium microcephalum Benth.

= Phyllocephalum microcephalum =

Species of flowering plant

Phyllocephalum microcephalum is a species of Asian flowering plant in the family Asteraceae.
