= Baccharoides lasiopus =

Scientific classification
- Kingdom: Plantae
- Clade: Tracheophytes
- Clade: Angiosperms
- Clade: Eudicots
- Clade: Asterids
- Order: Asterales
- Family: Asteraceae
- Genus: Baccharoides
- Species: B. lasiopus

Binomial name
- Baccharoides lasiopus (O.Hoffm.) H.Rob.

Species of plant

Baccharoides lasiopus is a thinly branched herb or semi shrub within the family Asteraceae.

== Description ==
A woody shrub that grows up to 3 m with stems up to 3 cm in diameter; its bark is smooth and greyish brown. Leaves are ovate or elliptical in outline and can reach 25 cm in length and 9.5 cm in width but commonly shorter. Inflorescence is terminal, corymbosely arranged and crowded; flowers are pale mauve, purple or white.

== Distribution ==
The species occurs in Tropical East Africa, from the Ethiopia and Sudan southwards to Northern Zimbabwe. It is commonly found in bushland, riverine woodland or forest and grasslands. The plant is called muhasha in Swahili, known as Ol-euguru among the Maasai and Nkaputi among the Samburu.

== Uses ==
Powdered leaves of the species are used in a decoction to treat indigestion and stomach ache while extracts of the plant are used by the Kikuyu to treat malaria. Farmers in Kenya also use the plant to ward off weevils from harvested maize.
