= Lepidaploa violiceps =

Conservation status
- Endangered (IUCN 3.1)

Scientific classification
- Kingdom: Plantae
- Clade: Tracheophytes
- Clade: Angiosperms
- Clade: Eudicots
- Clade: Asterids
- Order: Asterales
- Family: Asteraceae
- Genus: Lepidaploa
- Species: L. violiceps

Binomial name
- Lepidaploa violiceps (H.Rob.) H.Rob.

Synonyms
- Vernonia violiceps H.Rob.

Species of flowering plant

Lepidaploa violiceps is a species of flowering plant in the family Asteraceae. It is a scrambling shrub found only in Ecuador. Its natural habitat is subtropical or tropical moist montane forests. It is threatened by habitat loss.
