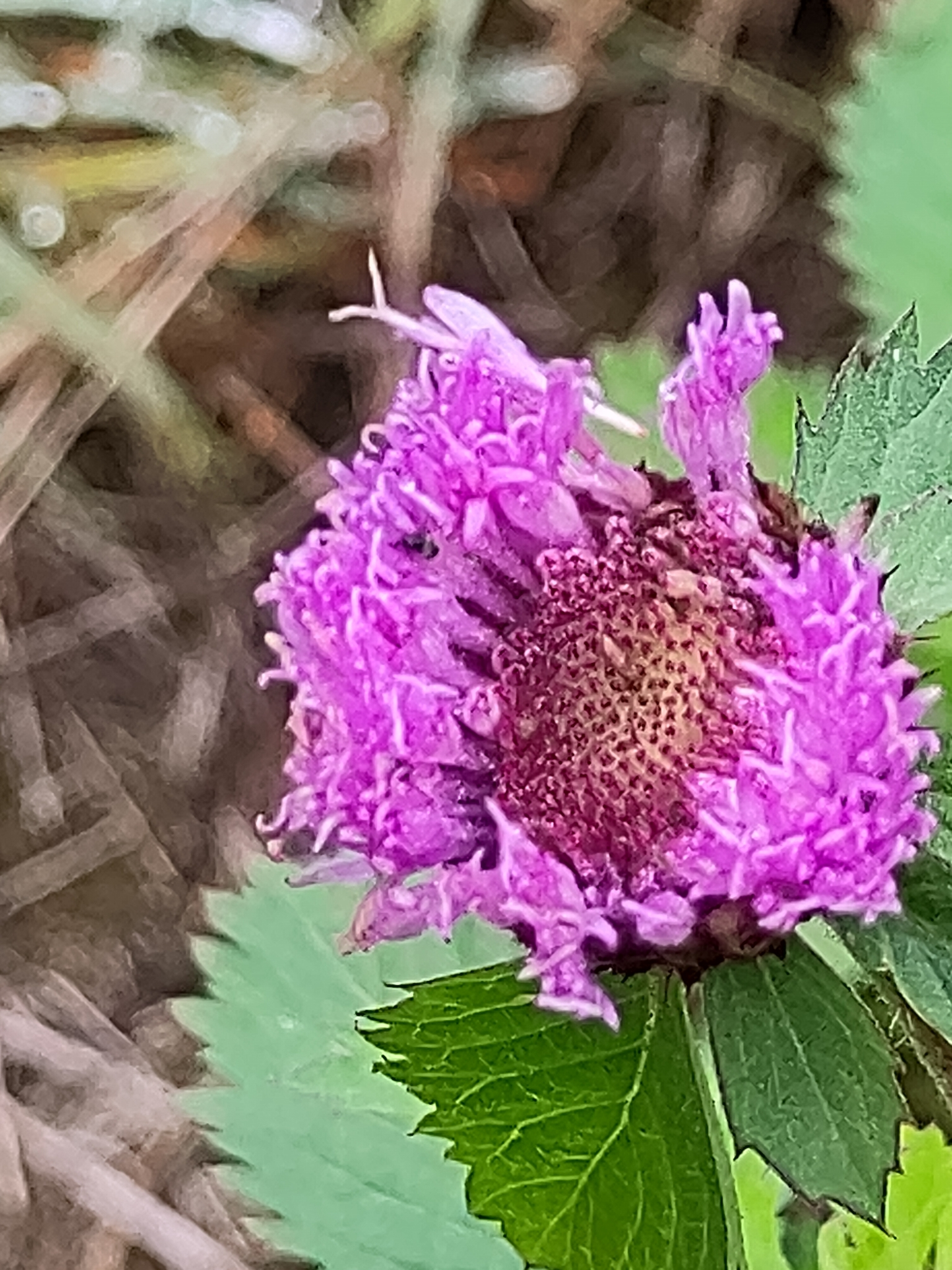

Scientific classification
- Kingdom: Plantae
- Clade: Tracheophytes
- Clade: Angiosperms
- Clade: Eudicots
- Clade: Asterids
- Order: Asterales
- Family: Asteraceae
- Genus: Centratherum
- Species: C. punctatum

Binomial name
- Centratherum punctatum Cass.

= Centratherum punctatum =

Species of plant

Centratherum punctatum, also known by its common name Brazilian bachelor's button, is a species of flowering plant from the genus Centratherum.
