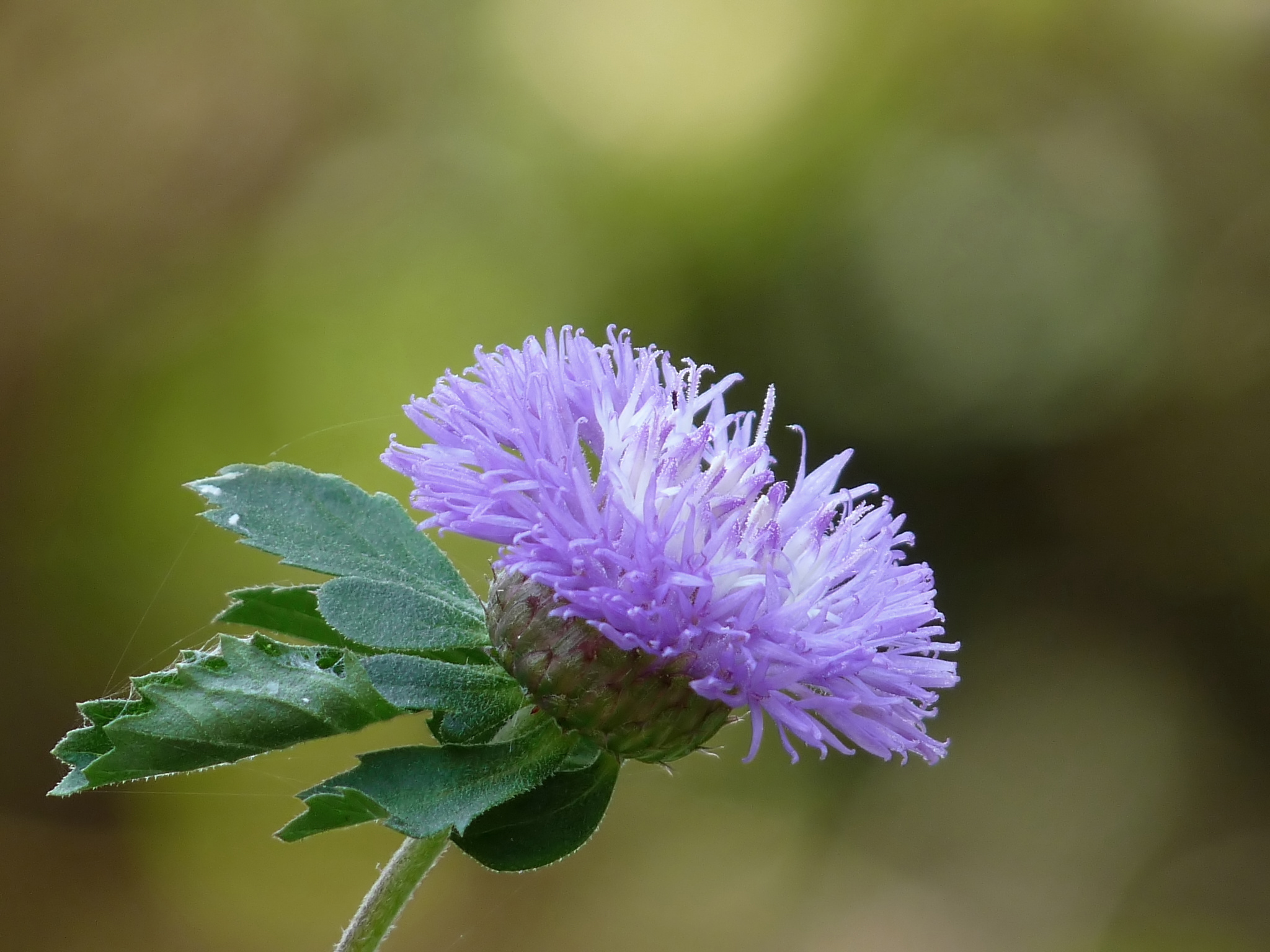
- Centratherum punctatum

Scientific classification
- Kingdom: Plantae
- Clade: Embryophytes
- Clade: Tracheophytes
- Clade: Spermatophytes
- Clade: Angiosperms
- Clade: Eudicots
- Clade: Asterids
- Order: Asterales
- Family: Asteraceae
- Tribe: Vernonieae
- Genus: Centratherum; Cassini

Type species
- Centratherum punctatum Cassini

Synonyms
- Ampherephis Kunth; Amphibecis Humb. ex Schrank; Crantzia Vell.; Oiospermum Less.; Spixia Schrank

= Centratherum =

Genus of flowering plants

Centratherum is a genus of flowering plants in the family Asteraceae. Common names include Brazilian button and lark daisy. It includes three species native to tropical South America.

Considered invasive in Hawaii (USA), Galapagos Islands, New Caledonia, Puerto Rico, and the Virgin Islands

== Species ==
Three species are accepted.

- Centratherum cardenasii H.Rob. – Bolivia (Santa Cruz)
- Centratherum punctatum Cass. – tropical South America from Venezuela to northern Argentina, introduced to parts of Central America, tropical Africa, tropical Asia, and Australia
- Centratherum repens (Spreng.) Loeuille & Pirani – Brazil (Bahia)

=== Formerly placed here ===
- Phyllocephalum phyllolaenum (DC.) Narayana – as Centratherum phyllolaenum Benth. ex Hook.f
