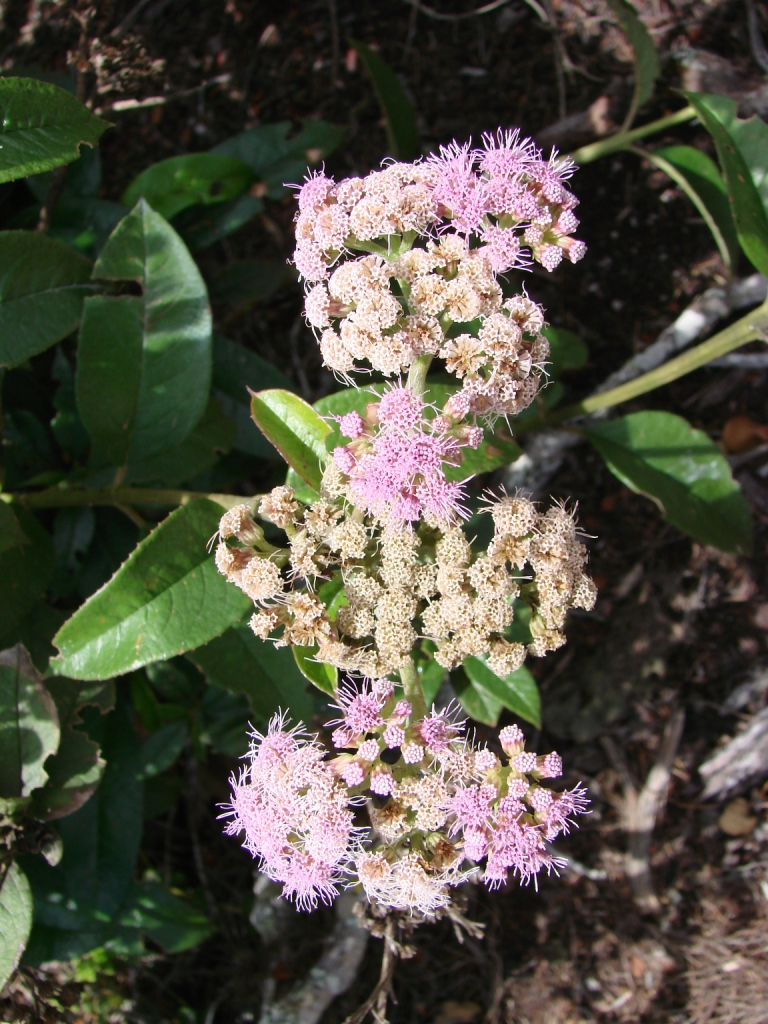
- Lepidaploa cotoneaster

Scientific classification
- Kingdom: Plantae
- Clade: Tracheophytes
- Clade: Angiosperms
- Clade: Eudicots
- Clade: Asterids
- Order: Asterales
- Family: Asteraceae
- Tribe: Vernonieae
- Genus: Lepidaploa (Cass.) Cass.

Type species
- Vernonia albicaulis Vahl ex Pers.

Synonyms
- Vernonia subg. Lepidaploa Cass.; Vernonia sect. Lepidaploa (Cass.) DC.

= Lepidaploa =

Genus of flowering plants

Lepidaploa is a genus of flowering plants in the family Asteraceae, native to tropical parts of the Western Hemisphere.

It is a relatively large genus, formerly subsumed in the genus Vernonia.

== Species ==
156 species are accepted.

- Lepidaploa acuminata (Less.) H.Rob.
- Lepidaploa acutiangula (Gardner) H.Rob.
- Lepidaploa adamantium (Gardner) H.Rob.
- Lepidaploa almasensis (D.J.N.Hind) H.Rob.
- Lepidaploa alvimii (H.Rob.) H.Rob.
- Lepidaploa amambaia H.Rob.
- Lepidaploa araguensis (V.M.Badillo) H.Rob.
- Lepidaploa araripensis (Gardner) H.Rob.
- Lepidaploa araujoa H.Rob.
- Lepidaploa arborescens (L.) H.Rob.
- Lepidaploa arbuscula (Less.) H.Rob.
- Lepidaploa arenaria (Mart. ex DC.) H.Rob.
- Lepidaploa argyrotricha (Sch.Bip. ex Baker) H.Rob.
- Lepidaploa aristosquamosa (Britton) H.Rob.
- Lepidaploa aronifolia (Gleason) H.Rob.
- Lepidaploa aurata M.Monge & Semir
- Lepidaploa aurea (Mart. ex DC.) H.Rob.
- Lepidaploa bahiana H.Rob.
- Lepidaploa bakerana (Britton) H.Rob.
- Lepidaploa balansae (Hieron.) H.Rob.
- Lepidaploa barbata (Less.) H.Rob.
- Lepidaploa beckii H.Rob.
- Lepidaploa bolivarensis (V.M.Badillo) H.Rob.
- Lepidaploa borinquensis (Urb.) H.Rob.
- Lepidaploa bracteospinoflava D.Marques & A.M.Teles
- Lepidaploa buchtienii (Gleason) H.Rob.
- Lepidaploa campirupestris Antar & Loeuille
- Lepidaploa canescens (Kunth) H.Rob.
- Lepidaploa carachensis (V.M.Badillo) H.Rob.
- Lepidaploa chalybaea (Mart. ex DC.) H.Rob.
- Lepidaploa chamissonis (Less.) H.Rob.
- Lepidaploa chinchipensis H.Rob.
- Lepidaploa chiriquiensis (S.C.Keeley) H.Rob.
- Lepidaploa chrysotricha (Alexander) H.Rob.
- Lepidaploa cleocalderonae (H.Rob.) H.Rob.
- Lepidaploa commutata (Ekman) H.Rob.
- Lepidaploa complicata (C.Wright ex Griseb.) H.Rob.
- Lepidaploa congesta M.Monge & Semir
- Lepidaploa cordiifolia (Kunth) H.Rob.
- Lepidaploa costanensis (V.M.Badillo) H.Rob.
- Lepidaploa costata (Rusby) H.Rob.
- Lepidaploa cotoneaster (Willd. ex Spreng.) H.Rob.
- Lepidaploa coulonioides (H.Rob.) H.Rob.
- Lepidaploa crassifolia (Rusby) H.Rob.
- Lepidaploa cuiabensis (Rusby) H.Rob.
- Lepidaploa danielis (Cuatrec.) H.Rob.
- Lepidaploa davidsmithii H.Rob.
- Lepidaploa decumbens (Gardner) H.Rob.
- Lepidaploa deflexa (Rusby) H.Rob.
- Lepidaploa densipaniculata (Rusby) H.Rob.
- Lepidaploa desiliens (Gleason) H.Rob.
- Lepidaploa diazlunana (B.L.Turner) H.Rob.
- Lepidaploa edmundoi (G.M.Barroso) H.Rob.
- Lepidaploa ehretiifolia (Benth.) H.Rob.
- Lepidaploa ekmanii (Urb.) H.Rob.
- Lepidaploa eriolepis (Gardner) H.Rob.
- Lepidaploa ferreyrae (H.Rob.) H.Rob.
- Lepidaploa fieldiana (Gleason) H.Rob.
- Lepidaploa fournetii (H.Rob. & B.Kahn) H.Rob.
- Lepidaploa frangulifolia (Kunth) H.Rob.
- Lepidaploa fruticosa (L.) H.Rob.
- Lepidaploa glabra (Willd.) H.Rob.
- Lepidaploa gnaphaliifolia (A.Rich.) H.Rob.
- Lepidaploa gnaphalioides (Sch.Bip. ex Baker) H.Rob.
- Lepidaploa gracilis (Kunth) H.Rob.
- Lepidaploa grisea (Baker) H.Rob.
- Lepidaploa hagei (H.Rob.) H.Rob.
- Lepidaploa harrisii (S.Moore) H.Rob.
- Lepidaploa helophila (Mart. ex DC.) H.Rob.
- Lepidaploa imeriensis (V.M.Badillo) Pruski
- Lepidaploa irwinii H.Rob.
- Lepidaploa jenssenii (Ekman) H.Rob.
- Lepidaploa juruenensis H.Rob.
- Lepidaploa karstenii (Sch.Bip.) H.Rob.
- Lepidaploa koelzii (McVaugh) H.Rob.
- Lepidaploa krukovii H.Rob.
- Lepidaploa lehmannii (Hieron.) H.Rob.
- Lepidaploa leptoclada (Sch.Bip.) H.Rob.
- Lepidaploa lewisii H.Rob.
- Lepidaploa lilacina (Mart. ex DC.) H.Rob.
- Lepidaploa luetzelburgii (Mattf.) H.Rob.
- Lepidaploa macahensis (Glaz. ex G.M.Barroso) H.Rob.
- Lepidaploa mandonii (Sch.Bip. ex Gleason) H.Rob.
- Lepidaploa mapirensis (Gleason) H.Rob.
- Lepidaploa marguana (Cuatrec.) H.Rob.
- Lepidaploa mucronifolia (DC.) H.Rob.
- Lepidaploa muricata (DC.) H.Rob.
- Lepidaploa myriocephala (DC.) H.Rob.
- Lepidaploa nakajimae A.M.Teles
- Lepidaploa nitens (Gardner) H.Rob.
- Lepidaploa novarae (Cabrera) A.J.Vega & Dematt.
- Lepidaploa obtusifolia (Less.) H.Rob.
- Lepidaploa opposita A.M.Teles, Sobral & J.N.Nakaj.
- Lepidaploa orbicularis (Alain) H.Rob.
- Lepidaploa ovata (Less.) Pruski
- Lepidaploa pallescens (Gleason) H.Rob.
- Lepidaploa paraensis (H.Rob.) H.Rob.
- Lepidaploa pari (V.M.Badillo) H.Rob.
- Lepidaploa pellita (Kunth) H.Rob.
- Lepidaploa persericea (H.Rob.) H.Rob.
- Lepidaploa persicifolia (Desf.) H.Rob.
- Lepidaploa pineticola (Desf.) H.Rob.
- Lepidaploa pinheiroi (H.Rob.) H.Rob.
- Lepidaploa pluvialis (Gleason) H.Rob.
- Lepidaploa polypleura (S.F.Blake) H.Rob.
- Lepidaploa proctorii (Urbatsch) H.Rob.
- Lepidaploa pseudaurea (D.J.N.Hind) H.Rob.
- Lepidaploa pseudomuricata H.Rob.
- Lepidaploa psilostachya (DC.) H.Rob.
- Lepidaploa purpurata (Gleason) H.Rob.
- Lepidaploa reedii (Ekman ex Urb.) J.L.Gómez & Bécquer
- Lepidaploa reflexa (Gardner) H.Rob.
- Lepidaploa remotiflora (Rich.) H.Rob.
- Lepidaploa retrosetosa (H.Rob.) H.Rob.
- Lepidaploa rigida (Sw.) H.Rob.
- Lepidaploa rimachii (H.Rob.) H.Rob.
- Lepidaploa rufogrisea (A.St.-Hil.) H.Rob.
- Lepidaploa sagraeana (DC.) H.Rob.
- Lepidaploa salzmannii (DC.) H.Rob.
- Lepidaploa sanmartinensis H.Rob.
- Lepidaploa scintillans Dematt. & D.Marques
- Lepidaploa sclareifolia (Sch.Bip.) H.Rob.
- Lepidaploa segregata (Gleason) H.Rob.
- Lepidaploa sericea (Rich.) H.Rob.
- Lepidaploa setososquamosa (Hieron.) M.B.Angulo & Dematt.
- Lepidaploa silvae (H.Rob.) H.Rob.
- Lepidaploa solomonii H.Rob.
- Lepidaploa sordidopapposa (Hieron.) H.Rob.
- Lepidaploa sororia (DC.) H.Rob.
- Lepidaploa spixiana (Mart. ex DC.) H.Rob.
- Lepidaploa sprengeliana (Sch.Bip.) H.Rob.
- Lepidaploa stenophylla (Less.) H.Rob.
- Lepidaploa subsquarrosa (DC.) H.Rob.
- Lepidaploa tarijensis (Griseb.) H.Rob.
- Lepidaploa tenella (D.L.Nash) H.Rob.
- Lepidaploa tombadorensis (H.Rob.) H.Rob.
- Lepidaploa tortuosa (L.) H.Rob.
- Lepidaploa trilectorum (Gleason) H.Rob.
- Lepidaploa trinitatis (Ekman) H.Rob.
- Lepidaploa tristis (Hieron.) H.Rob.
- Lepidaploa uniflora (Mill.) H.Rob.
- Lepidaploa urbaniana (Ekman ex Urb.) H.Rob.
- Lepidaploa urceolata Renon, D.Marques & J.N.Nakaj.
- Lepidaploa valenzuelana (A.Rich.) J.L.Gómez
- Lepidaploa vauthieriana (DC.) H.Rob.
- Lepidaploa verticillata (Proctor ex C.D.Adams) H.Rob.
- Lepidaploa viminalis (Gleason) H.Rob.
- Lepidaploa violiceps (H.Rob.) H.Rob.
- Lepidaploa virentiformis (Malme) H.Rob.
- Lepidaploa wrightii (Sch.Bip.) H.Rob.
- Lepidaploa xiquexiquensis (D.J.N.Hind) Loeuille
- Lepidaploa yunquensis (Gleason) H.Rob.
- Lepidaploa yuruanensis V.M.Badillo
- Lepidaploa zumbadorensis (V.M.Badillo) V.M.Badillo
