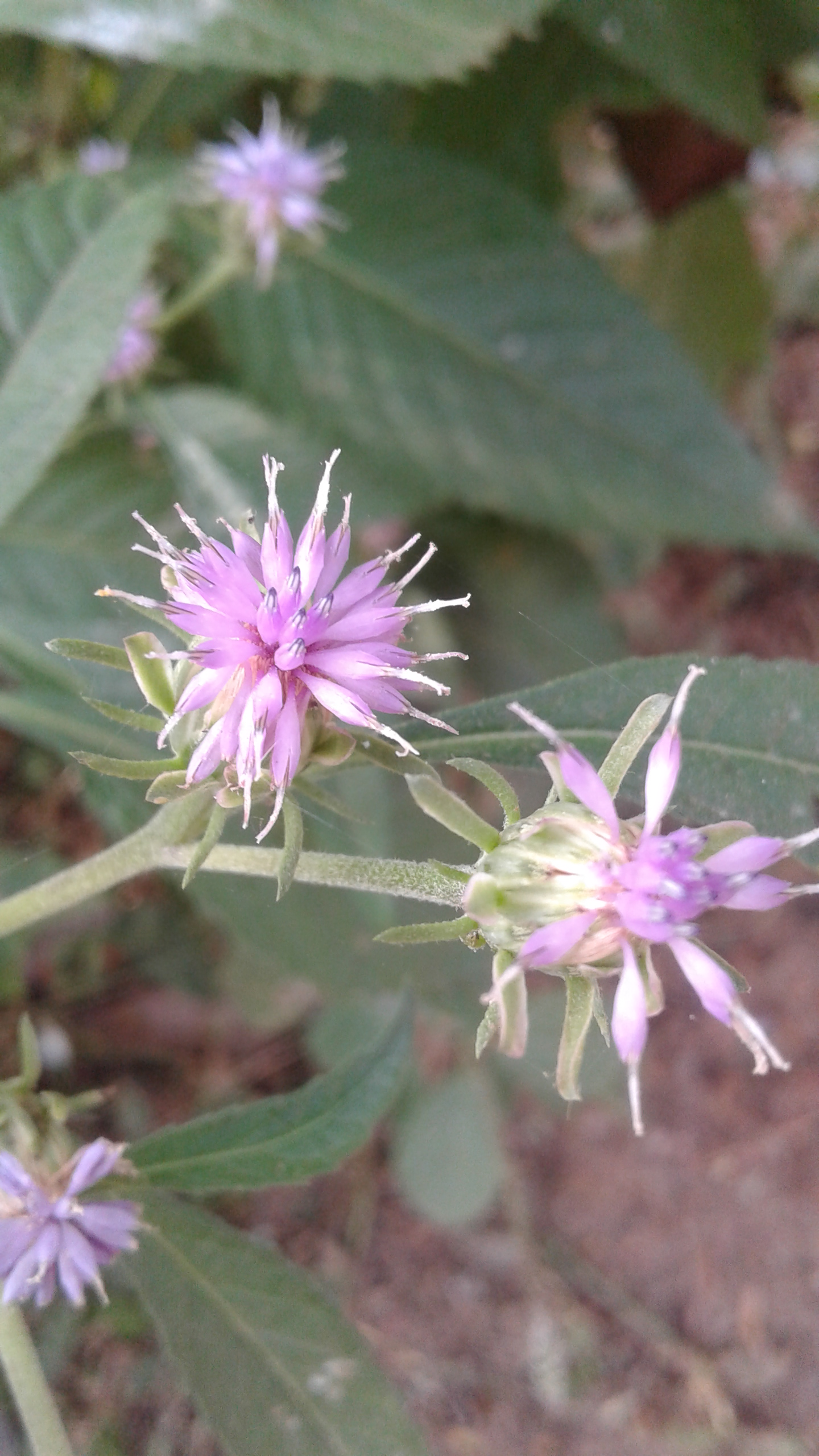

Scientific classification
- Kingdom: Plantae
- Clade: Tracheophytes
- Clade: Angiosperms
- Clade: Eudicots
- Clade: Asterids
- Order: Asterales
- Family: Asteraceae
- Genus: Baccharoides
- Species: B. anthelmintica

Binomial name
- Baccharoides anthelmintica (L.) Moench

Synonyms
- Ascaricida anthelminthica (L.) Sweet; Ascaricida indica Cass.; Centratherum anthelminticum (L.) Gamble; Conyza anthelmintica L.; Phyllocephalum anthelminticum (L.) S.R.Paul & S.L.Kapoor; Serratula anthelmintica (L.) Roxb.; Vernonia anthelmintica (L.) Willd.; Dolosanthus silvaticus Klatt; Vernonia stenolepis Oliv.

= Baccharoides anthelmintica =

Species of flowering plant

Baccharoides anthelmintica is a species of perennial plant from the family Asteraceae. It is native to South Asia and Eastern Africa. Its habitats include deciduous woodland, open dry forests, and riverine forests.
