= Epoxyeicosatetraenoic acid =

- 17,18-EEQ

Identifiers
CAS Number	(17S,18R)-EEQ: 131339-23-6
3D model (JSmol)	(5R,6S)-EEQ: Interactive image; (5S,6R)-EEQ: Interactive image; (8S,9R)-EEQ: Interactive image; (11S,12R)-EEQ: Interactive image; (14S,15R)-EEQ: Interactive image; (17S,18R)-EEQ: Interactive image
ChEBI	(8S,9R)-EEQ: CHEBI:137193; (11S,12R)-EEQ: CHEBI:137267; (14S,15R)-EEQ: CHEBI:137269; (17S,18R)-EEQ: CHEBI:76955; generic: CHEBI:72852
ChemSpider	67155383
PubChem CID	(17S,18S)-EEQ: 16061089
- InChI: (5S,6R)-EEQ: InChI=1S/C20H30O3/c1-2-3-4-5-6-7-8-9-10-11-12-13-15-18-19(23-18)16-14-17-20(21)22/h3-4,6-7,9-10,12-13,18-19H,2,5,8,11,14-17H2,1H3,(H,21,22)/b4-3-,7-6-,10-9-,13-12- Key: AKBOADNSBQNXRS-LTKCOYKYSA-N; (8S,9R)-EEQ: InChI=1S/C20H30O3/c1-2-3-4-5-6-7-8-9-12-15-18-19(23-18)16-13-10-11-14-17-20(21)22/h3-4,6-7,9-10,12-13,18-19H,2,5,8,11,14-17H2,1H3,(H,21,22)/b4-3-,7-6-,12-9-,13-10- Key: YKIOHMXLFWMWKD-JJUYGIQRSA-N; (11S,12R)-EEQ: InChI=1S/C20H30O3/c1-2-3-4-5-9-12-15-18-19(23-18)16-13-10-7-6-8-11-14-17-20(21)22/h3-4,6,8-10,12-13,18-19H,2,5,7,11,14-17H2,1H3,(H,21,22)/b4-3-,8-6-,12-9-,13-10- Key: QHOKDYBJJBDJGY-BVILWSOJSA-N; (14S,15R)-EEQ: InChI=1S/C20H30O3/c1-2-3-12-15-18-19(23-18)16-13-10-8-6-4-5-7-9-11-14-17-20(21)22/h3-4,6-7,9-10,12-13,18-19H,2,5,8,11,14-17H2,1H3,(H,21,22)/b6-4-,9-7-,12-3-,13-10- Key: RGZIXZYRGZWDMI-QXBXTPPVSA-N; (17S,18R)-EEQ: InChI=1S/C20H30O3/c1-2-18-19(23-18)16-14-12-10-8-6-4-3-5-7-9-11-13-15-17-20(21)22/h3,5-6,8-9,11-12,14,18-19H,2,4,7,10,13,15-17H2,1H3,(H,21,22)/b5-3-,8-6-,11-9-,14-12-/t18-,19+/m1/s1 Key: GPQVVJQEBXAKBJ-YQLHGUCYSA-N
- SMILES: (5R,6S)-EEQ: CC/C=C\C/C=C\C/C=C\C/C=C\CC1[C@H](O1)CCCC(=O)O; (5S,6R)-EEQ: CC/C=C\C/C=C\C/C=C\C/C=C\CC1O[C@H]1CCCC(=O)O; (8S,9R)-EEQ: CC/C=C\C/C=C\C/C=C\CC1O[C@H]1C/C=C\CCCC(=O)O; (11S,12R)-EEQ: CC/C=C\C/C=C\CC1O[C@H]1C/C=C\C/C=C\CCCC(=O)O; (14S,15R)-EEQ: CC/C=C\CC1O[C@H]1C/C=C\C/C=C\C/C=C\CCCC(=O)O; (17S,18R)-EEQ: CCC1O[C@H]1C/C=C\C/C=C\C/C=C\C/C=C\CCCC(=O)O

Properties
Chemical formula	C_{20}H_{30}O_{3}
Molar mass	318.457 g·mol^{−1}
- Except where otherwise noted, data are given for materials in their standard state (at 25 °C [77 °F], 100 kPa). Infobox references

Epoxyeicosatetraenoic acids (EEQs or EpETEs) are a set of biologically active epoxides that various cell types make by metabolizing the omega 3 fatty acid, eicosapentaenoic acid (EPA), with certain cytochrome P450 epoxygenases. These epoxygenases can metabolize EPA to as many as 10 epoxides that differ in the site and/or stereoisomer of the epoxide formed; however, the formed EEQs, while differing in potency, often have similar bioactivities and are commonly considered together.

== Structure ==
EPA is a straight-chain, 20 carbon omega-3 fatty acid containing cis double bonds between carbons 5 and 6, 8 and 9, 11 and 12, 14 and 15, and 17 and 18; each of these double bonds is designated with the notation Z to indicate its cis configuration in the IUPAC Chemical nomenclature used here. EPA is therefore 5Z,8Z,11Z,14Z,17Z-eicosapentaenoic acid. Certain cytochrome P450 epoxygenases metabolize EPA by converting one of these double bounds to an epoxide thereby forming one of 5 possible eicosatetraenoic acid epoxide regioisomers. These regioisomers are: 5,6-EEQ (i.e. 5,6-epoxy-8Z,11Z,14Z,17Z-eicosatetraenoic acid), 8,9-EEQ (i.e. 8,9-epoxy-5Z,11Z,14Z,17Z-eicosatetraenoic acid), 11,12-EEQ (i.e. 11,12-epoxy-5Z,8Z,14Z,17Z-eicosatetraenoic acid), 14,15-EEQ (i.e. 14,15-epoxy-5Z,8Z,11Z,17Z-eicosatetraenoic acid), and 17,18-EEQ (i.e. 17,18-epoxy-5Z,8Z,11Z,14Z-eicosatetraenoic acid). The epoxydases typically make both R/S enantiomers of each epoxide. For example, they metabolize EPA at its 17,18 double bond to a mixture of 17R,18S-EEQ and 17S,18R-EEQ. The EEQ products therefore consist of as many as ten isomers.

== Production ==
Cellular cytochrome P450 epoxygenases metabolize various polyunsaturated fatty acids to epoxide-containing products. They metabolize the omega-6 fatty acids arachidonic acid, which possess four double bonds, to 8 different epoxide isomers which are termed epoxyeicosatrienoic acids or EETs and linoleic acid, which possess two double bonds, to 4 different epoxide isomers, i.e. two different 9,10-epoxide isomers termed coronaric acids or leukotoxins and two different 12,13-epoxides isomers termed vernolic acids or isoleukotoxins. They metabolize the omega-3 fatty acid, docosahexaenoic acid, which possesses six double bonds, to twelve different epoxydocosapentaenoic acid (EDPs) isomers. In general, the same epoxygenases that accomplish these metabolic conversions also metabolize the omega-6 fatty acid, EPA, to 10 epoxide isomers, the EEQs. These epoxygenases fall into several subfamilies including the cytochrome P4501A (i.e.CYP1A), CYP2B, CYP2C, CYP2E, and CYP2J subfamilies, and within the CYP3A subfamily, CYP3A4. In humans, CYP1A1, CYP1A2, CYP2C8, CYP2C9, CYP2C18, CYP2C19, CYP2E1, CYP2J2, CYP3A4, and CYP2S1 metabolize EPA to EEQs, in most cases forming principally 17,18-EEQ with smaller amounts of 5,6-EEQ, 8,9-EEQ, 11,12-EEQ, and 14,15-EEQ isomers. However, CYP2C11, CYP2C18, and CYP2S1 also form 14,15-EEQ isomers while CYP2C19 also forms 11,12-EEQ isomers. The isomers formed by these CYPs vary greatly with, for example, the 17,18-EEQs made by CYP1A2 consisting of 17R,18S-EEQ but no detectable 17S,18R-EEQ and those made by CYP2D6 consisting principally of 17R,18S-EEQ with far smaller amounts of 17S,18R-EEQ. In addition to the cited CYP's, CYP4A11, CYP4F8, CYP4F12, CYP1A1, CYP1A2, and CYP2E1, which are classified as CYP monooxygenase rather than CYP epoxygenases because they metabolize arachidonic acid to monohydroxy eicosatetraenoic acid products (see 20-Hydroxyeicosatetraenoic acid), i.e. 19-hydroxyeicosatetraenoic acid and/or 20-hydroxyeicosatetranoic acid, take on epoxygenase activity in converting EPA primarily to 17,18-EEQ isomers (see Epoxyeicosatrienoic acid). 5,6-EEQ isomers are generally either not formed or formed in undetectable amounts while 8,9-EEQ isomers are formed in relatively small amounts by the cited CYPs. The EET-forming CYP epoxygenases often metabolize EPA to EEQs (as well as DHA to EDPs) at rates that exceed their rates in metabolizing arachidonic acid to EETs; that is, EPA (and DHA) appear to be preferred over arachidonic acid as substrates for many CYP epoxygenases.

The EEQ-forming cytochromes are widely distributed in the tissues of humans and other mammals, including blood vessel endothelium, blood vessel atheroma plaques, heart muscle, kidneys, pancreas, intestine, lung, brain, monocytes, and macrophages. These tissues are known to metabolize arachidonic acid to EETs; it has been shown or is presumed that they also metabolize EPA to EEQs. Note, however, that the CYP epoxygenases, similar to essentially all CYP450 enzymes, are involved in the metabolism of xenobiotics as well as endogenously-formed compounds; since many of these same compounds also induce increases in the levels of the epoxygenases, CYP oxygenase levels and consequently EEQ levels in humans vary widely and are highly dependent on recent consumption history; numerous other factors, including individual genetic differences, also contribute to the variability in CYP450 epoxygenase expression.

== EEQ metabolism ==
In cells, EEQs are rapidly metabolized by the same enzyme that similarly metabolizes other epoxy fatty acids including the EETs viz., cytosolic soluble epoxide hydrolase [EC 3.2.2.10.] (also termed sEH or the EPHX2), to form their corresponding vicinal diol dihydroxyeicosatetraenoic acids (diHETEs). The omega-3 fatty acid epoxides, EEQs and EPAs, appear to be preferred over EETs as substates for sEH. sEH converts 17,18-EEQ isomers to 17,18-dihydroxy-eicosatetraenoic acid isomers (17,18-diHETEs), 14,15-EEQ isomers to 14,15-diHETE isomers, 11,12-EEQ isomers to 11,12-diHETE isomers, 8,9-EEQ isomers to 8,9-diHETE isomers, and 5,6-EEQ isomers to 5,6-diHETE isomers. The product diHETEs, like their epoxy precursors, are enantiomer mixtures; for instance, sEH converts 17,18-EEQ to a mixture of 17(R),18(R)-diHETE and 17(S),18(S)-diHETE. Since the diHETE products are as a rule generally far less active than their epoxide precursors, the sEH pathway of EET metabolism is regarded as a critical EEQ-inactivating pathway.

Membrane-bound microsomal epoxide hydrolase (mEH or epoxide hydrolase 2 [EC 3.2.2.9.]) can metabolize EEQs to their dihydroxy products but is regarded as not contributing significantly to EEQ inactivation in vivo except possibly in rare tissues where the sEH level is exceptionally low while the mEH level is high.

In addition to the sEH pathway, EETs may be acylated into phospholipids in an acylation-like reaction. This pathway may serve to limit the action of EETs or store them for future release. EETs are also inactivated by being further metabolized through three other pathways: beta oxidation, omega oxidation, and elongation by enzymes involved in fatty acid synthesis.

== Clinical significance ==
EEQs, similar to EDPs, have not been studied nearly as well as the epoxyeicosatrienoic acids (EETs). In comparison to the many activities attributed to the EETs in animal model studies, a limited set of studies indicate that EEQs (and EPAs) mimic EETs in their abilities to dilate arterioles, reduce hypertension, inhibit inflammation (the anti-inflammatory actions of EEQ are less potent than those of the EETs) and thereby reduce occlusion of arteries to protect the heart and prevent strokes (see Epoxyeicosatrienoic acid § Clinical significance sections on a) Regulation of blood pressure, b) Heart disease, c) Strokes and seizures, and d) Inflammation); they also mimic EETs in possessing analgesia properties in relieving certain types of pain. Often, the EEQs (and EPAs) exhibit greater potency and/or effectiveness than EET in these actions. In human studies potentially relevant to one or more of these activities, consumption of long chain omega-3 fatty acid (i.e. EPA- and DHA-rich) diet produced significant reductions in systolic blood pressure and increased peripheral arteriole blood flow and reactivity in patients at high to intermediate risk for cardiovascular events; an EPA/DHA-rich diet also reduced the risk while high serum levels of DHA and EPA were associated with a low risk of neovascular age-related macular degeneration. Since such diets lead to large increases in the serum and urine levels of EPAs, EEQs, and the dihydroxy metabolites of these epoxides but relatively little or no increases in EETs or lipoxygenase/cyclooxygenase-producing metabolites of arachidonic acid, DHA, and/or EEQs, it is suggested that the diet-induced increases in EPAs and/or EEQs are responsible for this beneficial effects. In direct contrast to the EETs which have stimulating effects in the following activities (see Epoxyeicosatrienoic acid § Cancer), EEQs (and EPAs) inhibit new blood vessel formation (i.e. angiogenesis), human tumor cell growth, and human tumor metastasis in animal models implanted with certain types of human cancer cells. The possible beneficial effects of omega-3 fatty acid-rich diets in pathological states involving inflammation, hypertension, blood clotting, heart attacks and other cardiac diseases, strokes, brain seizures, pain perception, acute kidney injury, and cancer are suggested to result, at least in part, from the conversion of dietary EPA and DHA to EEQs and EPAs, respectively, and the cited subsequent actions of these metabolites.
