= CYP2C19 =

Mammalian protein found in humans

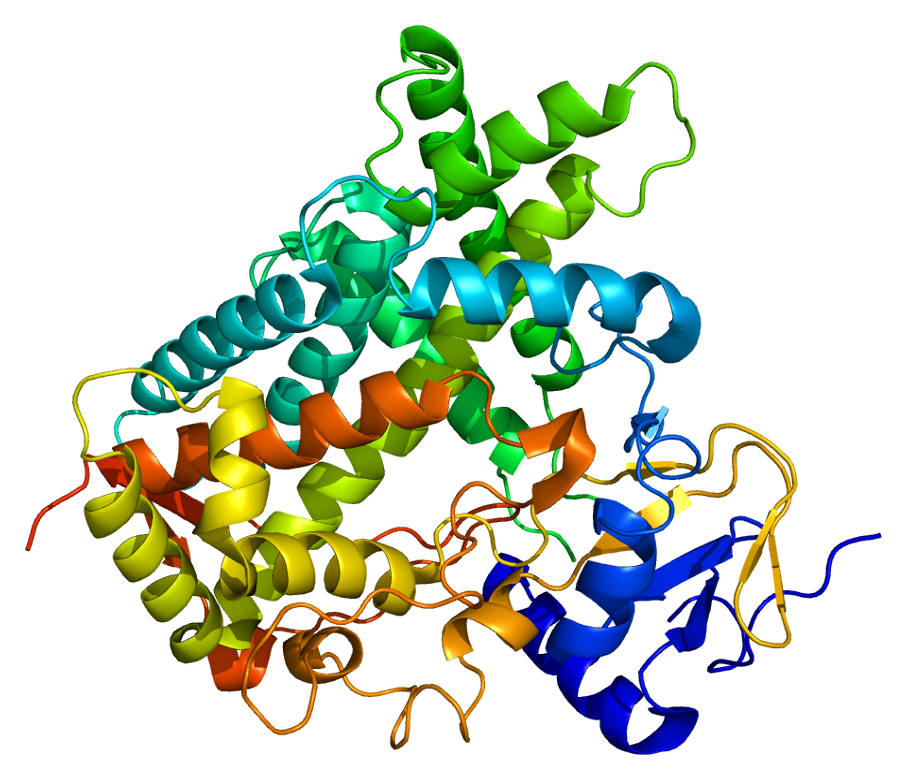

Identifiers
- Aliases: CYP2C19, CPCJ, CYP2C, CYPIIC17, CYPIIC19, P450C2C, P450IIC19, cytochrome P450 family 2 subfamily C member 19
- External IDs: OMIM: 124020; GeneCards: CYP2C19
Available structures
PDB	Human UniProt search: PDBe RCSB
PDB	List of PDB id codes 4GQS
Enzyme activity
EC #	BRENDA	ExPASy	KEGG	MetaCyc
1.14.14.1	↗	↗	↗	↗
1.14.14.51	↗	↗	↗	↗
1.14.14.52	↗	↗	↗	↗
1.14.14.53	↗	↗	↗	↗
1.14.14.75	↗	↗	↗	↗

Gene location (Human)
Chr.	Chromosome 10 (human)
Band	10q23.33	Start	94,762,681 bp
Band	10q23.33	End	94,855,547 bp
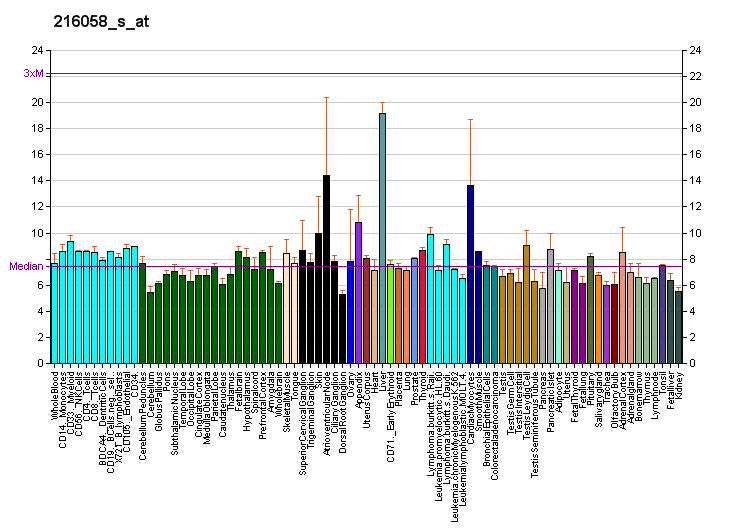
RNA expression pattern
Bgee	Human / Mouse (ortholog); Top expressed in: liver; duodenum; right lobe of liver; gallbladder; gastric mucosa; body of stomach; mucosa of transverse colon; vagina; fundus; skin of abdomen / n/a; More reference expression data
BioGPS	More reference expression data
Gene ontology
Molecular function	iron ion binding; oxygen binding; arachidonic acid epoxygenase activity; metal ion binding; monooxygenase activity; steroid hydroxylase activity; heme binding; oxidoreductase activity, acting on paired donors, with incorporation or reduction of molecular oxygen; enzyme binding; oxidoreductase activity; oxidoreductase activity, acting on paired donors, with incorporation or reduction of molecular oxygen, reduced flavin or flavoprotein as one donor, and incorporation of one atom of oxygen
Cellular component	organelle membrane; endoplasmic reticulum membrane; membrane; intracellular membrane-bounded organelle; endoplasmic reticulum; cytoplasm
Biological process	steroid metabolic process; epoxygenase P450 pathway; omega-hydroxylase P450 pathway; heterocycle metabolic process; monoterpenoid metabolic process; xenobiotic metabolic process; organic acid metabolic process
Sources:Amigo / QuickGO
Orthologs
Databases	NCBI: entry; OMA: entry
Species	Human	Mouse
Entrez	1557	n/a
Ensembl	ENSG00000165841	n/a
UniProt	P33261	n/a
RefSeq (mRNA)	NM_000769	n/a
RefSeq (protein)	NP_000760	n/a
Location (UCSC)	Chr 10: 94.76 – 94.86 Mb	n/a
PubMed search		n/a
- Wikidata
View/Edit Human

Cytochrome P450 2C19 (abbreviated CYP2C19) is an enzyme protein. It is a member of the CYP2C subfamily of the cytochrome P450 mixed-function oxidase system. This subfamily includes enzymes that catalyze metabolism of xenobiotics, including some proton pump inhibitors and antiepileptic drugs. In humans, it is the CYP2C19 gene that encodes the CYP2C19 protein. CYP2C19 is a liver enzyme that acts on at least 10% of drugs in current clinical use, among them the antiplatelet treatment clopidogrel (Plavix), drugs that treat pain associated with ulcers, such as omeprazole, antiseizure drugs such as mephenytoin, the antimalarial proguanil, and the anxiolytic diazepam.

CYP2C19 has been annotated as (R)-limonene 6-monooxygenase and (S)-limonene 6-monooxygenase in UniProt.

== Function ==
The gene encodes a member of the cytochrome P450 superfamily of enzymes. Enzymes in the CYP2C subfamily, including CYP2C19, account for approximately 20% of cytochrome P450 in the adult liver. These proteins are monooxygenases that catalyze many reactions involved in drug metabolism and synthesis of cholesterol, steroids and other lipids. This protein localizes to the endoplasmic reticulum and is known to metabolize many drugs. Polymorphism within this gene is associated with variable ability to metabolize drugs. The gene is located within a cluster of cytochrome P450 genes on chromosome no.10 arm q24.

CYP2C19 also possesses epoxygenase activity: it is one of the principal enzymes responsible for attacking various long-chain polyunsaturated fatty acids at their double (i.e. alkene) bonds to form epoxide products that act as signaling agents. It metabolizes:

1. arachidonic acid to various epoxyeicosatrienoic acids (also termed EETs);
2. linoleic acid to 9,10-epoxy octadecenoic acids (also termed vernolic acid, linoleic acid 9:10-oxide, or leukotoxin) and 12,13-epoxy-octadecenoic (also termed coronaric acid, linoleic acid 12,13-oxide, or isoleukotoxin);
3. docosahexaenoic acid to various epoxydocosapentaenoic acids (also termed EDPs); and
4. eicosapentaenoic acid to various epoxyeicosatetraenoic acids (also termed EEQs).

Along with CYP2C19, CYP2C8, CYP2C9, CYP2J2, and possibly CYP2S1 are the main producers of EETs and, very likely EEQs, EDPs, and the epoxides of linoleic acid.

== Pharmacogenomics ==
Pharmacogenomics is a study that analyzes how an individual's genetic makeup affects the response to drugs of this individual. There are many common genetic variations that affect the expression of the CYP2C19 gene, which in turn influences the enzyme activity in the metabolic pathways of those drugs in which this enzyme is involved.

The Clinical Pharmacogenetics Implementation Consortium (CPIC) provides therapeutic guidelines that are widely utilized to suggest suitable treatment plans. These recommendations are particularly relevant for patients requiring antiplatelet medication and are based on the results of genotype testing. A key aspect of these CPIC guidelines is the translation of genotype to phenotype, a process that relies on the "star" nomenclature system maintained by the Pharmacogene Variation Consortium assigns labels to known polymorphisms that affect drug response. A label consists of a star (asterisk) character (*) followed by a number. The most common variant (also called wild type) has "CYP2C19*1" label. The variant genotypes of CYP2C19*2 (NM_000769.2:c.681GA; p.Pro227Pro; rs4244285), CYP2C19*3 (NM_000769.2:c.636G>A; p.Trp212Ter; rs4986893) and CYP2C19*17 (NM_000769.2:c.-806C>T; rs12248560) are major factors attributed to interindividual differences in the pharmacokinetics and response to CYP2C19 substrates.

CYP2C19*2 and *3 (loss-of-function alleles) are associated with diminished enzyme activity, whereas CYP2C19*17 (gain-of-function allele) results in increased activity. The Working Group of the Association for Molecular Pathology Clinical Practice Committee recommended these three variant alleles to be included in the minimal clinical pharmacogenomic testing panel, called tier 1. The extended panel of variant alleles, called tier 2, additionally includes the following CYP2C19 alleles: *4.001 (*4A), *4.002 (*4B), *5, *6, *7, *8, *9, *10, and *35, all of them associated with diminished enzyme activity. Although these tier 2 alleles are included in many platforms, they were not included in the tier 1 recommendations because of low minor allele frequency (which can increase false-positive occurrences), less well-characterized impact on CYP2C19 function, or a lack of reference materials. In partnership with the clinical testing community, the Centers for Disease Control and Prevention established the Genetic Testing Reference Material Program to meet the need for publicly available characterized reference materials. Its goal is to improve the supply of publicly available and well-characterized genomic DNA used as reference materials for proficiency testing, quality control, test development/validation, and research studies.

The allele frequencies of CYP2C19*2 and *3 are significantly higher in Chinese populations than in European or African populations, and are found at approximately 3–5% of European and 15–20% of Asian populations. Among Arab population, the frequency of CYP2C19 genotypes including *1/*17, *1/*2, *2/*2, *3/*3, and *1/*3 were 20.2%, 16.7%, 6.1%, 5.45%, 0.7%, and 0.35%, respectively. In a study of 2.29 million direct-to-consumer genetics research participants, the overall frequencies of *2, *3, and *17 were 15.2%, 0.3%, and 20.4%, respectively, but varied by ethnicity. The most common variant diplotypes were *1/*17 at 26% and *1/*2 at 19.4%. The less common *2/*17, *17/*17 and *2/*2 genotypes occurred at 6.0%, 4.4%, and 2.5%, respectively. Overall, 58.3% of participants had at least one increased-function or no-function CYP2C19 allele.

CYP2C19 is involved in processing or metabolizing at least 10% of commonly prescribed drugs. Variations to the enzyme can have a wide range of impacts to drug metabolism. In patients with an abnormal CYP2C19 variant certain benzodiazepines should be avoided, such as diazepam (Valium), lorazepam (Ativan), oxazepam (Serax), and temazepam (Restoril). Other categories of drugs impacted by modified CYP2C19 include proton pump inhibitors, anticonvulsants, hypnotics, sedatives, antimalarial drugs, and antiretroviral drugs.

On the basis of their ability to metabolize (S)-mephenytoin or other CYP2C19 substrates, individuals can be classified as ultrarapid metabolizers (UM), extensive metabolizers (EM) or poor metabolizers (PM). In the case of proton pump inhibitors, PMs exhibit a drug exposure that is 3 to 13 times higher than that of EMs. Loss-of-function alleles, CYP2C19*2 and CYP2C19*3 (and others, which are the subject of ongoing research) predict PMs, and the gain-of-function CYP2C19*17 allele predicts UMs.

Although the amount of CYP2C19 enzyme produced by the *17 allele is greater than of the *1 allele, whether the carriers of the *17 allele experience any significant difference in response to drugs compared to the wild-type, is a topic of ongoing research, studies show varying results. Some studies have found that the *17 variant's effect on the metabolism of omeprazole, pantoprazole, escitalopram, sertraline, voriconazole, tamoxifen and clopidogrel is modest, particularly compared to the impact of loss-of-function alleles (*2, *3), therefore, in case of these medications, the EM designation is sometimes applied instead of the UM one. For example, carriers of the *17 allele did not demonstrate different gastric pH comparing to *1 after taking the proton pump inhibitor omeprazole, a CYP2C19 substrate. Other studies concluded that the *17 allele seems to be the factor responsible for lower response to some drugs, even at higher doses, for example, to escitalopram for symptom remission in major depressive disorder patients. CYP2C19*17 carrier status is significantly associated with enhanced response to clopidogrel and an increased risk of bleeding; the highest risk was observed for CYP2C19*17 homozygous patients. A study found that escitalopram serum concentration was 42% lower in patients homozygous for CYP2C19*17. An important limitation of all these studies is the single-gene analysis, since most drugs that are metabolized by CYP2C19 are also metabolized by CYP2D6 and CYP3A4 enzymes. Besides that, other genes are involved in drug response, for example, escitalopram is transported by P-glycoprotein, encoded by the ABCB1 gene. In order for the studies on CYP2C19*17 to be conclusive, the differences in other genes that affect drug response have to be excluded. The prevalence of the CYP2C19*17 variant is less than 5% in Asian populations and is approximately four times higher in European and African populations.

The alleles CYP2C19*2 and *3 may reduce the efficacy of clopidogrel (Plavix), an antiplatelet medication. The basis for this reduced effect of clopidogrel in patients who have a gene of reduced activity may seem somewhat paradoxical, but can be understood as follows. Clopidogrel is administered as a "prodrug", a drug that is inactive when taken, and then depends on the action of an enzyme in the body to be activated. In patients with a gene of reduced activity, clopidogrel may not be metabolized to its biologically active form and therefore not achieve pharmacological effect in the body. The relative risk of major cardiac events among patients treated with clopidogrel is 1.53 to 3.69 times higher for carriers of CYP2C19*2 and CYP2C19*3 compared with non-carriers. A 2020 systematic review and meta-analysis also confirmed that the CYP2C19*2 variant has a strong association with clopidogrel resistance. In 2021 a higher risk of stroke at 90 days was found with clopidogrel than ticagrelor, which does not require metabolic conversion, among Han Chinese CYP2C19 loss-of-function carriers with minor ischemic stroke or TIA.

== Ligands ==
The following is a table of selected substrates, inducers, and inhibitors of CYP2C19. Where classes of agents are listed, there may be exceptions within the class.

Inhibitors of CYP2C19 can be classified by their potency, such as:

- Strong being one that causes at least a 5-fold increase in the plasma AUC values, or more than 80% decrease in clearance of substrates.
- Moderate being one that causes at least a 2-fold increase in the plasma AUC values, or 50–80% decrease in clearance of substrates.
- Weak being one that causes at least a 1.25-fold but less than 2-fold increase in the plasma AUC values, or 20–50% decrease in clearance of substrates.

Selected inducers, inhibitors, and substrates of CYP2C19
Substrates	Inhibitors	Inducers
antidepressants; TCAs; amitriptyline; clomipramine; imipramine; SSRIs; citalopram; escitalopram; sertraline; moclobemide; bupropion; antiepileptics; diazepam; mephenytoin; nordazepam; phenytoin; phenobarbital; primidone; hexobarbital; methylphenobarbital; proton pump inhibitors; lansoprazole; omeprazole; pantoprazole; rabeprazole; esomeprazole; clopidogrel (antiplatelet drug), a prodrug inactive unless converted into the active form by CYP2C19, CYP3A4, CYP2C9, CYP1A2, and CYP2B6 enzymes.; proguanil (prophylactic antimalarial); propranolol (beta blocker); limonene (monoterpene); gliclazide (sulfonylurea); carisoprodol (muscle relaxant); chloramphenicol (bacteriostatic antimicrobial); cyclophosphamide (alkylating antineoplastic agent); indomethacin (NSAID); nelfinavir (antiretroviral); nilutamide (antiandrogen); progesterone (sex hormone); teniposide (chemotherapeutic); warfarin (anticoagulant); tapentadol (analgesic); voriconazole (antifungal); tamoxifen (selective estrogen receptor modulator); mavacamten (hypertrophic cardiomyopathy inhibitor)	Strong: fluconazole (antifungal); ticlopidine (antiplatelet); moclobemide (antidepressant); fluvoxamine (SSRI); chloramphenicol (bacteriostatic antimicrobial); fluoxetine (SSRI); Moderate: felbamate (anticonvulsant); Weak: Several anticonvulsants, including topiramate; omeprazole (proton pump inhibitor); voriconazole (antifungal); Unspecified potency: proton pump inhibitors; lansoprazole; pantoprazole; rabeprazole; esomeprazole; cimetidine (H2-receptor antagonist); indomethacin (NSAID); ketoconazole (antifungal); modafinil (eugeroic); probenecid (uricosuric); isoniazid (antibiotic)	Unspecified potency: rifampicin (bactericidal); artemisinin (in malaria); carbamazepine (anticonvulsant, mood stabilizing); norethisterone (contraceptive); prednisone (corticosteroid); aspirin in low doses (89 mg)

== See also ==
- Cytochrome P450 oxidase
