= Epoxyeicosatrienoic acid =

Class of fatty acids

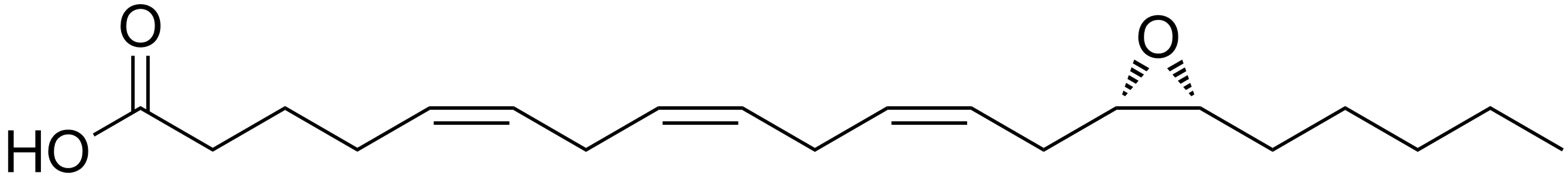
Chemical structure of 14,15-epoxyeicosatrienoic acid

Epoxyeicosatrienoic acids or EETs are signaling molecules formed within various types of cells by the metabolism of arachidonic acid by a specific subset of cytochrome P450 enzymes, termed cytochrome P450 epoxygenases. They are nonclassic eicosanoids.

EETs are generally short-lived, being rapidly converted from epoxides to less active or inactive dihydroxy-eicosatrienoic acids (diHETrEs) by a widely distributed cellular enzyme, soluble epoxide hydrolase (sEH), also termed epoxide hydrolase 2. The EETs consequently function as transiently acting, short-range hormones; that is, they work locally to regulate the function of the cells that produce them (i.e. they are autocrine agents) or of nearby cells (i.e. they are paracrine agents). The EETs have been most studied in animal models where they show the ability to lower blood pressure possibly by a) stimulating arterial vasorelaxation and b) inhibiting the kidney's retention of salts and water to decrease intravascular blood volume. In these models, EETs prevent arterial occlusive diseases such as heart attacks and brain strokes not only by their anti-hypertension action but possibly also by their anti-inflammatory effects on blood vessels, their inhibition of platelet activation and thereby blood clotting, and/or their promotion of pro-fibrinolytic removal of blood clots. With respect to their effects on the heart, the EETs are often termed cardio-protective. Beyond these cardiovascular actions that may prevent various cardiovascular diseases, studies have implicated the EETs in the pathological growth of certain types of cancer and in the physiological and possibly pathological perception of neuropathic pain. While studies to date imply that the EETs, EET-forming epoxygenases, and EET-inactivating sEH can be manipulated to control a wide range of human diseases, clinical studies have yet to prove this. Determination of the role of the EETs in human diseases is made particularly difficult because of the large number of EET-forming epoxygenases, large number of epoxygenase substrates other than arachidonic acid, and the large number of activities, some of which may be pathological or injurious, that the EETs possess.

== Structure ==
EETs are epoxide eicosatrienoic acid metabolites of arachidonic acid (a straight chain eicosatetraenoic acid, omega-6 fatty acid). Arachidonic acid has 4 cis double bonds, which are abbreviated with the notation Z in the IUPAC chemical nomenclature used here. These double bonds are located between carbons 5–6, 8–9, 11–12, and 14–15; arachidonic acid is therefore 5Z,8Z,11Z,14Z-eicosatetraenoic acid. Cytochrome P450 epoxygenases attack these double bonds to form their respective eicosatrienoic acid epoxide regioisomers viz. 5,6-EET (i.e. 5,6-epoxy-8Z,11Z,14Z-eicosatrienoic acid), 8,9-EET (i.e. 8,9-epoxy-5Z,11Z,14Z-eicosatrienoic acid), 11,12-EET (i.e. 11,12-epoxy-5Z,8Z,14Z-eicosatrienoic acid), or, as drawn in the attached figure, 14,15-EET (i.e. 14,15-epoxy-5Z,8Z,11Z-eicosatrienoic acid). The enzymes generally form both R/S enantiomers at each former double bond position; for example, cytochrome P450 epoxidases metabolize arachidonic acid to a mixture of 14R,15S-EET and 14S,15R-EET.

== Production ==
The cytochrome P450 (CYP) superfamily of enzymes is distributed broadly throughout bacteria, archaea, fungi, plants, animals, and even viruses. The superfamily comprises more than 11,000 genes categorized into 1,000 families. Humans have 57 putatively active CYP genes and 58 CYP pseudogenes; only a relatively few of the active CYP genes code for EET-forming epoxygenases, i.e. protein enzymes with the capacity to attach atomic oxygen to the carbon-carbon double bonds of unsaturated long chain fatty acids such as arachidonic acid. The CYP epoxygenases fall into several subfamilies including CYP1A, CYP2B, CYP2C, CYP2E, CYP2J, and within the CYP3A sub family, CYP3A4; in humans, CYP2C8, CYP2C9, CYP2C19, CYP2J2, and possibly CYP2S1 isoforms are the main producers of EETs although CYP2C9, CYP2C18, CYP3A4, CYP4A11, CYP4F8, and CYP4F12 are capable of producing the EETs and may do so in certain tissues. The CYP epoxygenases can epoxidize any of the double bounds in arachidonic acid but most of them are relatively selective in that they make appreciable amounts of only one or two EETs with 11,12-EET and 14,15-EET accounting for 67–80% of the product made by the cited CYP epoxidases as well as the main EETs made by mammalian tissues. CYP2C9, CYP2J9, and possibly the more recently characterized CYP2S1 appear to be the main produces of the EETs in humans with CYP2C9 being the main EET producer in vascular endothelial cells and CYP2J9 being highly expressed (although less catalytically active than CYP2C) in heart muscle, kidneys, pancreas, lung, and brain. CYP2S1 is expressed in macrophages, liver, lung, intestine, and spleen and is abundant in human and mouse atherosclerosis (i.e. atheroma) plaques as well as inflamed tonsils.

ETEs are commonly produced by the stimulation of specific cell types. The stimulation causes arachidonic acid to be released from the sn-2 position of cellular phospholipids through the action of phospholipase A_{2}-type enzymes and subsequent attack of the released arachidonic acid by a CYP epoxidase. In a typical example of this mechanism, bradykinin or acetylcholine acting through their respective bradykinin receptor B_{2} and muscarinic acetylcholine receptor M_{1} or muscarinic acetylcholine receptor M_{3} stimulate vascular endothelial cells to make and release EETs.

The CYP epoxygenases, similar to essentially all CYP450 enzymes, are involved in the metabolism of diverse xenobiotics and natural compounds. Since many of these same compounds also induce increases in the levels of the epoxygenases, CYP oxygenase levels and consequently EET levels in humans vary widely and are highly dependent on their recent consumption history.

== Metabolism of EETs ==
In cells, the EETs are rapidly metabolized by a cytosolic soluble epoxide hydrolase (sEH) which adds water (H_{2}O) across the epoxide to form their corresponding vicinal-diol dihydroxyeicosatrienoic acids (diHETrEs or DHETs), i.e. sEH converts 14,15-ETE to 14,15-dihydroxy-eicosatrienoic acid (14,15-diHETrE), 11,12-ETE to 11,12-diHETrE, 8,9-ETE to 8,9-diHETrE, and 5,6-ETE to 5,6-diHETrE. The product diHETrEs, like their epoxy precursors, are enantiomer mixtures; for instance, sEH converts 14,15-ETE to a mixture of 14(S),15(R)-diHETrE and 14(R),15(S)-diHETrE. However, 5,6-EET is a relatively poor substrate for sEH and in cells is more rapidly metabolized by cyclooxygenase-2 to form 5,6-epoxy-prostaglandin F1α. Since the diHETrE products are as a rule generally far less active than their epoxide precursors, the sEH pathway of EET metabolism is regarded as a critical EET-inactivating pathway. In some instances, however, the diHETrEs have been found to possess appreciable activity as indicated in the Biological activities section below.

Membrane-bound microsomal epoxide hydrolase (mEH or epoxide hydrolase 1 [EC 3.2.2.9.]) can metabolize EETs to their dihydroxy products but is regarded as not contributing significantly to EET inactivation in vivo except perhaps in brain tissue where mEH activity levels far outstrip those of sEH. Furthermore, two other human sEH, epoxide hydrolases 3 and 4, have been defined but their role in attacking EETs (and other epoxides) in vivo has not yet been determined. Besides these four epoxide hydrolase pathways, EETs may be acylated into phospholipids in an acylation-like reaction. This pathway may serve to limit the action of EETs or store them for future release. EETs are also inactivated by being further metabolized through three other pathways: beta oxidation, omega oxidation, and elongation by enzymes involved in fatty acid synthesis. These alternate to sEH pathways of EET metabolism ensure that blockade of sEH with drugs can increase EET levels only moderately in vivo.

== Biological effects ==
Generally, EETs cause:

- Calcium release from intracellular stores
- Increased sodium-hydrogen antiporter activity
- Increased cell proliferation
- Decreased cyclooxygenase activity

Other effects are specific to certain cells or locations; EETs:

- Are cardioprotective after ischemic heart attack and reperfusion.
- Act in the corpus cavernosum to maintain penile erection.
- Specific epoxidation of EET sites produces endogenous PPARα agonists.
- Decrease release of somatostatin, insulin and glucagon from endocrine cells.
- Stimulate blood vessel formation (angiogenesis).
- Cause vasodilation in the systemic arterial circulation.
- Cause vasoconstriction of the liver sinusoidal and pulmonary venous systems.
- Increased risk of tumor adhesion on endothelial cells.
- Decrease platelet aggregation responses.
- Increase axon growth in neurons.

Diol metabolites of the EETs, i.e. the diHETrEs (also termed DHETs), have relatively little or no activity compared to the EETs in most systems. However:

- The chemotaxis response of human monocytes to monocyte chemotactic protein 1) in vivo and in vitro appears to depend on the generation of EETs and conversion of these EETs to diHETrEs.
- Certain diHETrEs dilate human coronary arteries with efficacies approaching those of the EETs.
- 11,12-diHETrE but not 11,12-EET appears to support the maturation of the myelocyte cell line (i.e. support myelopoiesis) in mice and to promote certain types of angiogenesis in mice and zebrafish.
- In opposition of the anti-inflammatory actions of EETs, diHETrEs may have some pro-inflammatory actions.

== Clinical significance ==
=== Regulation of blood pressure ===
With respect to the regulation of blood pressure as well as the kidneys' regulation of salt and water absorption (which contributes to blood pressure regulation), EETS are counterpoises to another CYP-derived arachidonic acid metabolite, 20-hydroxyeicosatetraenoic acid (20-HETE). In humans, the major CYPs making 20-HETE are CYP4A11, CYP4F2, and CYP4F3. In animal models, 20-HETE raises blood pressure by contracting arteries and stimulating the kidney to reabsorb salt and water to increase the intravascular volume (see 20-Hydroxyeicosatetraenoic acid). EETs have the opposite effects. They are one type of endothelium-derived hyperpolarizing factor, i.e. a substance and/or electrical signal synthesized or generated in and released from the vascular endothelium that hyperpolarize nearby vascular smooth muscle cells. This causes these cells to relax and thereby lowers blood pressure. In animal (primarily rodent) models, EETs dilate smaller sized resistance arteries involved in causing hypertension as well as cardiac and renal arteries. They cause smooth muscle hyperpolarization by opening vascular smooth muscle large-conductance calcium-activated potassium channels, opening certain vascular smooth muscle transient receptor potential channels, or facilitating the movement of excitatory signals through gap junctions between endothelium and smooth muscles or between smooth muscles. The actual mechanism(s) involved in these EET-induced effects have not been fully elucidated although some studies implicate EET binding to an unidentified cell surface receptor and/or Gs protein-linked G protein–coupled receptor to initiate the signal pathway(s) leading to the cited channel and gap junction changes. With respect to the kidney, studies in rodents find that 20-HETE increases sodium and water reabsorption while the EETs, which are made in the proximal tubules and cortical collecting ducts, reduce sodium ion and water transport at both sites by inhibiting kidney sodium–hydrogen antiporter (i.e. Na+/H+ exchanger) and/or epithelial sodium channels. Mice lacking either of the EET-producing Cyp2c44 or Cyp4ac44 genes (by gene knockout) develop hypertension when fed high sodium or high potassium diets. These and large number of other studies included in the cited references implicate the EETs in the control of at least certain forms of hypertension in rodents.

In humans, vascular endothelium production of EETs involves mainly CYP2C9 and numerous indirect studies have implicated CYP epoxygenase, possibly CYP2C9, in producing a product which causes vasodilation. These studies find that selective (but not entirely specific) CYP epoxygenase-inhibiting drugs reduce human vasodilation responses elicited by the vasodilators bradykinin, acetylcholine, and methacholine; this suggests that these vasodilators operate by stimulation the production of EETs. Human studies also find that Caucasian but not African American subjects who have the Lys55Arg single nucleotide polymorphism variant in the polyunsaturated fatty epoxide-inactivating enzyme, sEH, express hyperactive sEH and show reduced vasodilation responses to bradykinin. Other studies find that women with pregnancy-induced hypertension and subjects with renovascular hypertension exhibit low plasma ETE levels. Finally, 11,12-EET has been shown to relax the internal mammary artery in women, indicating that at least this EET has direct vasodilating actions in humans. On the other hand, several studies in humans with single nucleotide polymorphism in CYP epoxygenase genes have given negative or confusing results. The most common variant of CYP2J2, rs890293, similarly contradictive or negative results are reported in studies on the rs11572082 (Arg1391Lys) variant of CYP2C8 and the rs1799853 (Arg144Cys) and rs1057910 (Ile359Leu) variants of CYP2C9, all of which code for an epoxygenase with reduced arachidonic acid-metabolizing and EET-forming activities.

While many of the cited studies suggest that one or more of the EETs released by vascular endothelial cells are responsible for the actions of the vasodilators and that deficiencies in EET production or excessive EET inactivation by sEH underlie certain types of hypertension in humans, they are not conclusive. They do not exclude a possibility that other polyunsaturated fatty acid epoxides such as those derived from eicosatetraenoic, docosatetraenoic, or linoleic acids made by CYP2C9 or other CYP epoxygenases contribute in small or large part to vasodilation responses and by this action promote blood flow to tissues and function in lowering high blood pressures. Furthermore, the genetic studies conducted to date on SNP variants do not give strong support for an antihypertensive role for the EETs or EET-forming epoxygenases in humans. Recently developed drugs which are metabolically stable analogs of the EETs and thereby mimic the EETs actions or, alternatively of drugs which inhibit sEH and thereby increase EET levels are in the pre-clinical development stage for treating human hypertension. Testing for their usefulness in treating human hypertension is made difficult because of: 1) the large number of CYP epoxygenases along with their differing tissue distributions and sensitivities to drug inhibitors; 2) the diversity of EETs made by the CYP epoxygenases, some of which differ in activities; 3) the diversity of fatty acid substrates metabolized by the CYP epoxygenases some of which are converted to epoxides (e.g. the epoxide metabolites of linoleic, docosahexaenoic, eicosapentaenoic acids), which have different activities than the EETs or may even be overtly toxic to humans (see Coronaric acid); 4) the sEH-derived dihydroxy metabolites of the EETs some of which have potent vasodilating effects in the certain vascular networks in rodents and therefore potentially in humans; and 5) the non-specificity and side effects of the latter drugs.

As indicated on the ClinicalTrials.gov web site, a National Institutes of Health-sponsored clinical trial entitled "Evaluation of Soluble Epoxide Hydrolase (s-EH) Inhibitor in Patients With Mild to Moderate Hypertension and Impaired Glucose Tolerance" has not been completed or reported on although started in 2009.

=== Heart disease ===
As indicated elsewhere on this page, EETs inhibit inflammation, inhibit blood clot formation, inhibit platelet activation, dilate blood vessels including the coronary arteries, reduce certain types of hypertension, stimulate the survival of vascular endothelial and cardiac muscle cells by inhibiting apoptosis, promote blood vessel growth (i.e. angiogenesis), and stimulate smooth muscle cell migration; these activities may protect the heart. Indeed, studies on in vivo animal and in vitro animal and human cell model systems indicate that the ETEs reduce infarct (i.e. injured tissue) size, reduce cardiac arrhythmias, and improve the strength of left ventricle contraction immediately after blockade of coronary artery blood flow in animal models of ischemia-reperfusion injury; EETs also reduce the size of heart enlargement that occurs long after these experiment-induced injuries.

Humans with established coronary artery disease have higher levels of plasma EETs and higher ratios of 14,15-EET to 14,15-diHETrE (14,15-diHETrE is the less active or inactive metabolite 14,15-EET). This suggests that the EETs serve a protective role in this setting and that these plasma changes were a result of a reduction in cardiac sEH activity. Furthermore, coronary artery disease patients who had lower levels of EETs/14,15-di-ETE ratios exhibited evidence of a poorer prognosis based on the presence of poor prognostic indicators, cigarette smoking, obesity, old age, and elevation in inflammation markers.

=== Strokes and seizures ===
Indirect studies in animal models suggest that EETs have protective effects in strokes (i.e. cerbrovasular accidents). Thus, sEH inhibitors and sEH-gene knockout have been shown to reduce the damage to brain that occurs in several different models of ischemic stroke; this protective effect appears due to a reduction in systemic blood pressure and maintenance of blood flow to ischemic areas of the brain by arteriole dilation as a presumed consequence of inhibiting the degradation of EETs (and/or other fatty acid epoxides). sEH-gene knockout mice were also protected from that brain damage that followed induced-subarachnoid hemorrhage; this protective effect appeared due to a reduction in cerebral edema which was also presumable due to the prolongation of EET half-lives. 14,15-EET levels have been shown to be elevated in the cerebrospinal fluid of humans suffering subarachnoid hemorrhage.

sEH inhibitors and gene knockout also reduce the number and severity of epileptic seizures in several animal models; this effect is presumed due to the actions of EETs (and other epoxide fatty acids) in reducing cerebral blood flow changes, and reducing neuron production of neuroactive steroids, reducing neuroinflammation,

=== Portal hypertension ===
Portal hypertension or hypertension in the venous hepatic portal system of blood flow is defined as an increase in portal pressure above normal values of 10 millimeter of mercury. It is a serious, sometimes life-threatening complication of various diseases such as liver cirrhosis, liver fibrosis, massive fatty liver, portal vein thrombosis, liver schistosomiasis, massive liver involvement in miliary tuberculosis or sarcoidosis, and obstruction of the venous circuit at any level between liver and right heart (see Portal hypertension). Vascular contraction in the portal system is mediated by several agents: nitric oxide, carbon monoxide, prostacyclin I_{2}, and endothelium-derived hyperpolarizing factors (EDHFs). EDHFs include endothelin, angiotensin II, thromboxane A2, certain leukotrienes, and the EETs. In portal hypertension, portal vein endothelium appears to be dysfunctional in that it overproduces EDHFs. The EETs, particularly 11,12-EET, have a quite different effect on the liver sinusoidal veins than on arteries of the systemic circulation: they constrict the sinusoids. Levels of EETs in the plasma and liver of patients with cirrhosis and portal hypertension are reportedly elevated compared to normal subjects. These and other findings have led to the proposal that portal endothelium-derived EETs, perhaps acting in cooperation with another EDHF, endothelin, contribute to portal hypertension.

=== Cancer ===
The forced over-expression of CYP2J2 in or the addition of an EET to cultured human Tca-8113 oral squamous cancer cells, lung cancer A549 cells and NCL-H446 cells, HepG2 liver cancer cells, LS-174 colon cancer cells, SiHa uterine cervix cancer cells, U251 glioblastoma cancer cells, ScaBER urinary bladder cancer cells, and K562 erythroleukemia and HL-60 promyelocyte leukemic blood cancer cells caused an increase in their survival and proliferation. Putative inhibitors of CYP2J2 inhibit the growth in culture of several human cancer cell lines that express relatively high levels of CYP2J2 viz., Tca-8113 cells, HeLa uterine cervix cell lines, A549 cells, MDA-MB-435 breast cells, and HepG2 cells but they had no significant inhibitory effects on two cell lines that expressed little or no CYP2J2. A putative inhibitor of CYPJ2 also inhibited the growth of human K562 erythroleukemia in a mice model as well as the growth of mouse el4 lymphoma cells in mice that were forced to overexpress CYP2J2 cells in their vascular epithelium. Forced expression of CYP2J2 also enhanced, while forced inhibition of its expression (using Small interfering RNA) reduced, the survival, growth, and metastasis of MDA-MB-231 human breast carcinoma cells in the mouse model and likewise enhanced or reduced, respectively, the survival and growth of these cells in culture. Further studies found that the expression of CYP2J2 was in increased in the malignant cells, relative to the nearby normal cells, in the following specimens taken from humans suffering squamous-cell carcinoma and adenocarcinoma types of esophageal cancer and lung cancer, small cell lung carcinoma, breast cancer, stomach cancer, liver cancer, and colon adenocarcinoma; this CYP was also highly expressed in the malignant cells of patients with acute leukemia, chronic leukemia, and lymphoma. As a group, patients with these cancers exhibited increased levels of EETs in their urine and blood samples.

Studies of the CYP epoxygenases have not been restricted to the CYP2J subfamily. Reduction in the expression of CYP3A4 or CYP2C using small interfering RNA inhibits the growth of cultured MCF7, T47D, and MDA-MB-231 human breast cancer cells; in these studies 14,15-EET stimulated the proliferation of cultured MCF7 cells, reduction in the expression of CYP3A4 by small interference RNA methods, inhibited these cells from proliferating, and 14,15-ETE reversed the effect of CYP3A4 interference; in other studies, the forced overexpression of CYP3A4 stimulated the growth of human liver cancer (hepatoma) cell line, Hep3 . In human breast cancer, not only CYP2J2 but also CYP2C8 and CYP2C9 levels appear elevated while sEH levels appear reduced in malignant compared to nearby normal tissues; associated with this finding, the levels of 14,15-EET as well as the levels of 14,15-EET plus 14,15-dihydroxy-EET were significantly elevated in the cancerous compared to noncancerous cells and the levels of CYP2C8 and CYP2C9 proteins correlated positively and sEH levels correlated negatively with the tumor cells rate of proliferation as accessed by their Ki-67 levels while CYP2J2 levels correlated positively with poorer prognosis as predicted tumor histological grade and tumor size.

The cited findings suggest that various CYP epoxygenases along with the epoxide metabolites which they make promote the growth and spread of diverse types of cancer in animals and humans. Their effects may reflect the ability of the epoxide metabolites to stimulate the proliferation and survival of the target cancer cells but perhaps also to stimulate these cells to trigger new capillary formation (see Angiogenesis § Tumor angiogenesis), invade new tissues, and metastasize.

A series of drugs derived from Terfenadine have been shown to inhibit CYP2J2 and to suppress the proliferation and cause the apoptosis of various types of human cancer cell lines in culture as well as in animal models. However, clinical studies targeting CYP epoxygenases and EETs and to successfully suppress cancer in humans have not been reported.

Pro-angiogenic and tumor promoting effects of EETs have been attributed to downstream cyclooxygenase (COX)-derived metabolites. Dual sEH/COX inhibitors or sEH inhibitors supplemented with an enhanced omega-3 fatty acid diet and a depleted omega-6 fatty acid diet have been shown to induce significant anti-angiogenic effects and blunt tumor growth.

=== Inflammation ===
In vitro and animal model studies indicate that the EETs possess anti-inflammatory activity that is directed toward reducing, resolving, and limiting the damage caused by inflammation. Most of these studies have focused on circulating leukocytes, blood vessel endothelium, and the occlusion of blood vessels due to pathological blood clotting. EETs a) inhibit vascular endothelial cells from expressing cell adhesion molecules such as VCAM-1, ICAM-1, and E-selectin thereby limiting circulating leukocytes from adhering to blood vessel endothelium and migrating across this endothelium into tissues; 2) inhibit the expression and activity of cyclooxygenase-2 in blood monocytes thereby reducing their production of pro-inflammatory metabolites of arachidonic acid such as prostaglandin E2; 3) inhibit platelet aggregation thereby reducing thrombus (i.e. blood clot) formation; 4) promote fibrinolysis thereby dissolving blood clots; and 5) inhibit vascular smooth muscle cell proliferation thereby reducing blood vessel hypertrophy and narrowing.

=== Diabetes, non-alcoholic fatty liver disease, and kidney disease ===
EETs, pharmacological inhibition of sEH, and/or inhibition of sEH expression enhance insulin actions on animal tissues in vitro and have protective effects in ameliorating insulin resistance as well as many of the neurological and kidney complications of diabetes in various animal models of diabetes; the studies suggest that the EETs have beneficial effects in type I diabetes as well as type II diabetes. Treatment of EET analog is beneficial for hepatic insulin signaling in mouse model of insulin resistance. These interventions also gave beneficial results in animal models of non-alcoholic fatty liver disease and certain types inflammation-related kidney diseases including chronic kidney disease, renal ischemia-reperfusion injury, and polycystic kidney disease. The protective role of EETs in these animal model diseases may reflect, at least in part, their anti-inflammatory actions.

=== Pain ===
EETs have been shown to have anti-hyperalgesic and pain-relieving activity in several animal models of pain including nociception resulting from tissue injury, inflammation, and peripheral neuropathy (see Neuropathic pain) including pain secondary to experimentally induced diabetes in mice. The epoxides of omega-3 fatty acids appear far stronger and more involved in the relief of pain than the EETs (see Epoxydocosapentaenoic acid).
