= Epoxygenase =

Set of cytochrome P450 enzymes

Epoxygenases are a set of membrane-bound, heme-containing cytochrome P450 (CYP450 or just CYP) enzymes that metabolize polyunsaturated fatty acids (PUFAs) to epoxide products that have a range of biological activities.

The most thoroughly-studied substrate of the CYP epoxygenases is the PUFA arachidonic acid (AA). Eicosanoids are created from AA in three pathways:

1. Cyclooxygenases metabolize AA to various prostaglandin, thromboxane, and prostacyclin metabolites.
2. Lipoxygenases metabolize AA to hydroxyeicosatetraenoic acids (e.g. 5-HETE or 12-HETE) and leukotrienes (e.g. leukotriene B_{4} or leukotriene C_{4}).
3. CYP epoxygenases metabolize AA to epoxyeicosatrienoic acids (EETs).

Like the first two pathways, the third acts as a signaling pathway wherein the eicosatrienoic acid epoxide products work as secondary signals to activate their parent or nearby cells and thereby orchestrate functional responses. However, these enzymes are not limited to metabolizing AA to these particular eicosanoids. Rather, they act broadly across other PUFAs and produce a range of products that are structurally analogous to the eicosanoids but often with different bioactivity profiles. This is particularly true of the CYP epoxygenases.

While there are specific and well-characterized receptor proteins which metabolites from the first pathways are known to activate, no such receptors have been fully characterized for the epoxide metabolites. Furthermore, there are relatively few lipoxygenases and cyclooxygenases in the first and second pathways that form metabolites. There are a much larger number of metabolite-forming CYP epoxygenases, and they have important differences in mammalian animal models that make the research inapplicable to human biology. Thus, it has been difficult to define clear roles for the epoxygenase-epoxide pathways in human physiology and pathology.

== CYP epoxygenases ==
The cytochrome P450 (CYP) superfamily of membrane-bound (typically endoplasmic reticulum-bound) enzymes contain a heme cofactor and therefore are hemoproteins. The superfamily comprises more than 11,000 genes categorized into 1,000 families that are distributed broadly throughout bacteria, archaea, fungi, plants, animals, and even viruses. The CYP enzymes metabolize an enormously large variety of small and large molecules including foreign chemical substances, i.e. xenobiotics and pharmaceuticals, as well as a diversity of endogenously-formed substances such as various steroids, vitamin D, bilirubin, cholesterol, and fatty acids. Humans have 57 putatively active CYP genes and 58 CYP pseudogenes of which only a few are polyunsaturated fatty acid (PUFA) epoxygenases, i.e. enzymes with the capacity to attach atomic oxygen to the carbon–carbon double bonds of long chain PUFA to form their corresponding epoxides. These CYP epoxygenases represent a family of enzymes that consists of several members of the CYP1 and CYP2 subfamilies. The metabolism of the straight chain 20-carbon polyunsaturated fatty eicosatetraenoic acid arachidonic acid (AA) by certain CYP epoxygenases is a good example of their action. AA has four cis-configured double bonds (see Cis–trans isomerism) located between carbons 5-6, 8-9, 11-12, and 14-15 double bonds. (The cis configuration is termed Z in the IUPAC chemical nomenclature used here.) It is therefore 5Z,8Z,11Z,14Z-eicosatetraenoic acid. Certain CYP epoxygenases attack these double bonds to form their respective eicosatrienoic acid epoxide regioisomers. The products are therefore 5,6-EET (i.e. 5,6-epoxy-8Z,11Z,14Z-eicosatetraenoic acid), 8,9-EET (i.e. 8,9-epoxy-5Z,11Z,14Z-eicosatetraenoic acid), 11,12-EET (i.e. 11,12-epoxy-5Z,8Z,14Z-eicosatetraenoic acid), and/or 14,15-EET (i.e. 14,15-epoxy-5Z,8Z,11Z-eicosatetraenoic acid, the structure of which is illustrated in the attached figure). Note that the eicosatetraenoate substrate loses one double bond to become an eicosatrienoic acid with three double bonds and that the epoxygenases typically form a mixture of R/S enantiomers at the attacked double bond position. Thus, the CYP epoxygenases which attack AA's double bond between carbon 14 and 15 form a mixture of 14R,15S-ETE and 14S,15R-ETE. However, each CYP epoxygenase often shows preferences in the position of the double bond on which they act, partial selectivity in the R/S enantiomer ratios that they make at each double bond position, and different double bond position preferences and R/S selectivity ratios with different PUFA substrates. Finally, the product epoxides are short-lived in cells, generally existing for only several seconds before being converted by a soluble epoxide hydrolase (also termed epoxide hydrolase 2 or sEH) to their corresponding dihydroxy-eicosatetraenoic acid (diHETE) products, e.g. 14,15-EpETE rapidly becomes a mixture of 14(S),15(R)-diHETE and 14(R),15(S)-diHETE. Although there are exceptions, the diHETE products are generally far less active than their epoxide precursors; the sEH pathway is therefore regarded as an inactivating pathway which functions to limit epoxide activity.

The catalytic activity of endoplasmic reticulum-bound cytochrome P450 enzymes, including the epoxygenases, depends upon cytochrome P450 reductase (POR); it transfers electrons to, and thereby regenerates the activity of, the CYPs. The human gene that expresses POR is highly polymorphic; many of the polymorphic variant PORs cause significant decreases or increases in the activity of the CYPs, including the epoxygenases.

Scores of drugs have been shown to either inhibit or induce one or more of the CYP epoxygenases;

== CYP epoxygenase substrates and products ==
The most studied substrate of the CYP epoxygenases is the omega−6 fatty acid arachidonic acid. However, the CYP epoxygenases also metabolize other omega−6 fatty acids such as linoleic acid and the omega−3 fatty acids eicosapentaenoic acid and docosahexaenoic acid. The distinction between the omega−6 and omega−3 fatty acid substrates is important because omega−3 fatty acid metabolites can have lesser or different activities than omega−6 fatty acid metabolites; furthermore, they compete with the omega−6 fatty acids for the CYP epoxygenases, thereby reducing the production of omega−6 fatty acid metabolites. The human CYP P450 enzymes identified to have epoxygenase activity on one or more PUFAs include CYP1A1, CYP1A2, CYP2C8, CYP2C9, CYP2C18, CYP2C19, CYP2E1, CYP2J2, CYP2S1, CYP3A4, CYP4F2, CYP4F3A, CYP4F3B, CYP4A11, CYP4F8, and CYP4F12. CYP2C8 and CYP2C9 form particularly large amounts of superoxide anion (chemical formula O^{−}_{2}) during their metabolism of polyunsaturated fatty acids; this reactive oxygen species is toxic to cells and may be responsible for some of the activities ascribed to the epoxides made by the two CYPs.

== Omega−6 fatty acids ==
=== Arachidonic acid ===
In humans, CYP1A1, CYP1A2, CYP2C8, CYP2C9, CYP2C18, CYP2C19, CYP2E1, CYP2J2, and CYP2S1 isoforms metabolize arachidonic acid (AA) to epoxyeicosatrienoic acids (EETs) as defined using recombinant CYPs in an in vitro microsome assay. Most of these CYPs preferentially form 14,15-ETE, somewhat lower levels of 11,12-EET, and far lower, trace, or undetectable levels of 8,9-ETE and 4,5-ETE. There are exceptions to this rule with, for example, CYPE1 forming 14,15-EET almost exclusively, CYP2C19 forming 8,9-EET at slightly higher levels than 14,15-EET, and CYP3A4 forming 11,12-EET at slightly higher levels than 14,15-ETE. 14,15-EET and 11,12-EET are the major EETs produced by mammalian, including human, tissues. The activities and clinical significance of the EETs are given on the epoxyeicosatrienoic acid page.

CYP2C9, CYP2JP, and possibly the more recently characterized CYP2S1 appear to be the main producers of the EETs in humans, with CYPP2C9 being the main unsaturated fatty acid epoxide producer in vascular endothelial cells, and CYP2J2 being highly expressed (although less catalytically active than CYP2C9) particularly in heart muscle but also in kidneys, pancreas, lung, and brain. CYP2S1 is expressed in macrophages, liver, lung, intestine, and spleen; is abundant in human and mouse atherosclerosis (i.e. atheroma) plaques as well as inflamed tonsils; and, in addition to forming epoxides of AA (and other PUFAs), CYP2S1 metabolizes prostaglandin G_{2} and prostaglandin H_{2} to 12-hydroxyheptadecatrienoic acid (12-HHT). Possibly because of metabolizing and thereby inactivating the prostaglandins and/or because forming the bioactive metabolite, 12-HHT acid, rather than EETs, CYP2S1 may act to inhibit the function of monocytes and thereby limit inflammation as well as other immune responses.

CYP2C8, CYP2C19, and CYP2J2 are also implicated in converting AA to epoxides in humans.

=== Linoleic acid ===
CYP2C9 and CYP2S1 are known to, and many or all of the other CYPs that act on arachidonic acid are thought to, metabolize the 18 carbon essential fatty acid 9(Z),12(Z)-octadecadienoic acid, i.e. linoleic acid, at its 12,13 carbon–carbon double bonds to form (+) and (-) epoxy optical isomers viz., the 12S,13R-epoxy-9(Z)-octadecenoic and 12R,13S-epoxy-9(Z)-octadecenoic acids; this set of optical isomers is also termed vernolic acid, linoleic acid 12,13-oxide, and isoleukotoxin. CYPC2C9 is known and the other arachidonic acid-metabolizing CYPs are thought to likewise attack linoleic acid at its 9,10 carbon–carbon double bond to form 9S,10R-epoxy-12(Z)-octadecenoic and 9R,10S-epoxy-12(Z)-octadecenoic acid optical isomers; this set of optical isomers is also termed coronaric acid, linoleic acid 9,10-oxide, and leukotoxin. These linoleic acid-derived leukotoxin and isoleukotoxin sets of optical isomers possess activities similar to those of other molecules called leukotoxins, such as the pore-forming leukotoxin family of RTX toxin virulence factor proteins secreted by gram-negative bacteria, e.g. Aggregatibacter actinomycetemcomitans and Escherichia coli. That is, they are toxic to leukocytes as well as many other cell types and when injected into rodents produce multiple organ failure and respiratory distress. These effects appear due to the conversion of leukotoxin to its dihydroxy counterparts, 9R,10R- and 9S,10S-dihydroxy-12(Z)-octadecenoic acids, and isoleukotoxin to its 12R,13R- and 12S,13S-dihydroxy-9(Z)-octadecenoic acid counterparts by soluble epoxide hydrolase. Some studies suggest but have not proven that leukotoxin and isoleukotoxin, acting primarily if not exclusively through their respective dihydroxy counterparts, are responsible for or contribute to multiple organ failure, respiratory distress, and certain other cataclysmic diseases in humans.

=== Adrenic acid ===
Adrenic acid or 7(Z),10(Z),13(Z),16(Z)-docosatetraenoic acid, an abundant fatty acid in the adrenal gland, kidney, vasculature, and early human brain, is metabolized primarily to 7(Z),10(Z),13(Z)-16,17-epoxy-docosatrienoic acid and smaller amounts of its 7,8-, 10,11-, and 13,14-epoxy-docosatrienoic acids by bovine coronary arteries and adrenal zona glomerulosa cells through the apparent action of an unidentified CYP epoxygenase(s); the sEH-dependent metabolism of these epoxides to 7,8-, 10,11-, and 13,14-dihydroxy-docosatrienoic acids relaxes pre-contracted coronary and adrenal gland arteries suggesting that the dihydroxy metabolites may act as vascular endothelium-derived relaxing factors.

== Omega−3 fatty acids ==
=== Eicosapentaenoic acid ===
5(Z),8(Z),11(Z),14(Z),17(Z)-eicosapentaenoic acid (EPA) is metabolized by the same CYP epoxygenases that metabolize arachidonic acid primarily to 17,18-epoxy-5(Z),8(Z),11(Z),14(Z)-eicosatetraenoic acid and usually far smaller or undetectable amounts of EPA's 5,6-, 8,9-, 11,12-, or 14,15-epoxides; however, CYP2C9 metabolizes EPA primarily to 14,15-epoxy-5(Z),8(Z),11(Z),17(Z)-eicosatetraenoic acid, CYP2C11 forms appreciable amounts of this 14,15-epoxide in addition to the 17,18-epoxide, and CYP2C18 forms appreciable amounts of the 11,12 epoxide (11,12-epoxy-5(Z),8(Z),14(Z),17(Z)-eicosatetraenoic acid) in addition to the 17,18-epoxide. Furthermore, CYP4A11, CYP4F8, and CYP4F12, which are CYP monooxygenase rather than CYP epoxygenase in that they metabolize arachidonic acid to monohydroxy eicosatetraenoic acid products (see 20-Hydroxyeicosatetraenoic acid), i.e. 19-hydroxy- and/or 18-hydroxy-eicosatetraenoic acids, takes on epoxygenase activity in converting EPA primarily to its 17,18-epoxy metabolite (see Epoxyeicosatetraenoic acid).

=== Docosahexaenoic acid ===
4(Z),7(Z),10(Z),13(Z),16(Z),19(Z)-docosahexaenoic acid (DHA) is metabolized by the same CYP epoxygenases that metabolize arachidonic acid to form epoxide-containing docosapentaenoic acid products, particularly 19,20-epoxy-4(Z),7(Z),10(Z),13(Z),16(Z)-docosapentaenoic acid. These docosapentaenoic acid epoxides or epoxydocosapentaenoic acids (EDPs) have a somewhat different set of activities than, and thereby may serve in part as counterpoises to, the EETs; EDPs may also be responsible for some the beneficial effects attributed to omega−fatty acid-rich foods such as fish oil (see Epoxydocosapentaenoic acid).

=== α-Linolenic acid ===
The 18 carbon essential fatty acid, α-linolenic acid or 9(Z),12(Z),15(Z)-octadecatrienoic acid, is metabolized primarily to 9(Z),12(Z)-15,16-epoxy-octadecadienoic acid, but also to smaller amounts of its 9,10- and 12,13-epoxides in the serum, liver, lung, and spleen of mice treated with a drug that increases the expression of CYP1A1, CYP1A2 and/or CYP1B1. These epoxides are also found in the plasma of humans, and their levels greatly increase in subjects given an α-linolenic acid-rich diet.

== Genetic polymorphism in CYP epoxygenases ==
Human CYP epoxygenase genes come in many single nucleotide polymorphism (SNP) variants, some of which code for epoxygenase products with altered activity. Investigation into the impact of these variants on the bearers' health (i.e. phenotype) is an invaluable area of research which offers the opportunity to define the function of the epoxygenases and their polyunsaturated fatty acid (PUFA) metabolites in humans. However, SNP variants that cause altered PUFA metabolism may also cause altered metabolism of their other substrates, i.e. diverse xenobiotic (e.g. NSAID) and endobiotic (e.g. the primary female sex hormone, estradiol) compounds: the latter effects may lead to clinical manifestations that overshadow any manifestations resulting from changes in PUFA metabolism.

The most common SNP epoxygenase variants are as follows.

- CYP2C8*3 (30411A>G, rs10509681, Lys399Arg) converts arachidonic acid to 11,12-EET and 14,15-EET with a turnover rate less than half that of wild type CYP2C8; in a single recent report, male but not female carriers of the CYP2C8*3 allele had an increased risk of essential hypertension. Bearers of this SNP may or may not show increased risk of developing acute gastrointestinal bleeding during the use of non-steroidal anti-inflammatory drugs (NSAIDs) that are its substrates such as aceclofenac, celecoxib, diclofenac, ibuprofen, indomethacin, lornoxicam, meloxicam, naproxen, piroxicam, tenoxicam, and valdecoxib.
- CYP2J2*7 (−76G>T, rs890293, upstream Promoter (genetics) site) has decreased binding of the Sp1 transcription factor resulting in its lowered expression and lowered levels of EETs in plasma. Carriers of this SNP among a Uyghur population in China had a higher risk of coronary artery disease. However, CYP2J2*7 carriers showed no association with hypertension, heart attack, or stroke in a study of 5,740 participants of the cardiovascular cohort of the Malmö Diet and Cancer study; since other studies have afforded contradictory results, this allele is currently regarded as not associated with cardiovascular diseases (see Epoxyeicosatrienoic acid § Clinical significance). Bearers of this SNP in a Chinese population had a higher risk of younger onset of type 2 diabetes and among a Chinese Han population had a higher risk of Alzheimer's disease. 3) CYP2C8*2 (11054A>T, rs11572103, Ile269Phe) and CYP2C8*4 (11041C>, rs1058930, variants have reduced arachidonic acid-metabolizing activity but have not been clearly associated with cardiovascular or other diseases.
- CYPC28*4 (3608C>T, rs1058930, Ile264Met) has reduced arachidonic acid metabolizing activity. It has not been associated with cardiovascular diseases but has a higher incidence in subjects with type II diabetes in a small sample of Caucasians in Germany.
- The CYP2C9*2 (3608C>T, rs1799853, Arg144Cys) variant has a 50% reduction in polyunsaturated fatty acid metabolizing activity compared to CYP2C9 wild type; carriers of it show no association with cardiovascular disease but exhibit poor metabolism of the anti-coagulating, blood-thinning agent, warfarin. These carriers are susceptible to the gastrointestinal bleeding side effects of warfarin and the NSAID cited above.
- CYP2C9*3 (42624A>C, rs1057910, Iso359Leu) encodes an epoxygenase with reduced arachidonic acid metabolizing activity. This allele has not been directly associated with cardiovascular diseases but may be associated with the poor metabolism and therefore adverse reactions to warfarin, NSAID, sulfonylurea-containing oral hypoglycemic agents, and the anti-(epilepsy) drug, phenytoin.
- CYP2C19*2 (19154G>A, rs4244285, Il264Met) and CYP2C19*3 (17948G>A, rs4986893, His212X) are loss-of-function null alleles; carriers of the CYP2C19*3 but not the CYP2C19*2 allele showed a reduced risk of developing essential hypertension in a large Korean population study. Bearers of null alleles would be expected to be poor metabolizers of several drugs which are CYP2C19*2 or CYP2C19*3 substrates. This is particularly the case with Clopidogrel, a drug used to block platelet activation, blood clotting, and thereby heart attack, stroke, and peripheral artery occlusion in people at high risk of these events; CYP2C19 metabolizes clopidogrel to it active form. Consequently, patients with severe deficiencies in this CYP, i.e. bearers of CYP2C19*3 or CYP2C19*2 alleles, fail to gain protection from clopidogrel and have a higher risk of the cited cardiovascular events than clopidogrel-treated patients bearing wild type CYP2C19 alleles.
- CYPC19*17 (-800C>T, rs12248560, site upstream gene promoter site) causes overproduction of its epoxygenase and thereby the ultra fast metabolism of arachidonic acid. Bearers of this allele have not been associated with cardiovascular diseases but clearly show a decreased risk of developing breast cancer and endometriosis possible because their rapid metabolism of estrogen leads to lower estrogen levels and thereby a lower risk of these estrogen-fueled diseases. These bearers also a higher rate of metabolism of, and therefore reduced responsiveness to, certain proton pump inhibitor and antidepressant drugs.

== Genetic polymorphism in cytochrome P450 reductase ==
As indicated above, cytochrome P450 reductase (POR) is responsible for regenerating the activity of CYPs including the epoxygenases. Several genetic variants of the human POR gene impact epoxygenase activity. For example, POR missense mutations A287P and R457H lead to reductions in the activity of CYP2C19 and CYP2C9, respectively, whereas A503V and Q153R missense mutations lead to small increases in the activity of CYP2C9. While these and other POR genetic variants have not yet been associated with epoxygenase-related disease, they contribute to the marked variability in the activity of the epoxygenases between individuals.
