= CYP1A1 =

Protein-coding gene in humans

Identifiers
- Aliases: CYP1A1, AHH, AHRR, CP11, CYP1, P1-450, P450-C, P450DX, CYPIA1, cytochrome P450 family 1 subfamily A member 1
- External IDs: OMIM: 108330; MGI: 88588; GeneCards: CYP1A1
Available structures
PDB	Ortholog search: PDBe RCSB
PDB	List of PDB id codes 4I8V
Enzyme activity
EC #	BRENDA	ExPASy	KEGG	MetaCyc
1.14.14.1	↗	↗	↗	↗
4.2.1.152	↗	↗	↗	↗

Gene location (Human)
Chr.	Chromosome 15 (human)
Band	15q24.1	Start	74,719,542 bp
Band	15q24.1	End	74,725,536 bp

Gene location (Mouse)
Chr.	Chromosome 9 (mouse)
Band	9 B|9 31.34 cM	Start	57,595,211 bp
Band	9 B|9 31.34 cM	End	57,611,107 bp
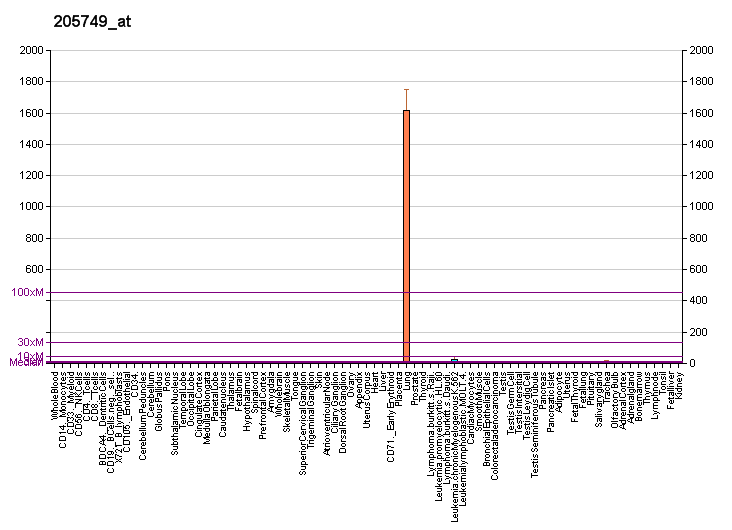
RNA expression pattern
Bgee	Human / Mouse (ortholog); Top expressed in: testicle; jejunal mucosa; islet of Langerhans; trachea; right lobe of liver; epithelium of colon; urinary bladder; cartilage tissue; skin of leg; mucosa of urinary bladder / Top expressed in: transitional epithelium of urinary bladder; lip; olfactory epithelium; gastrula; right lung; embryo; embryo; skin of external ear; jejunum; skin of abdomen; More reference expression data
BioGPS	More reference expression data
Gene ontology
Molecular function	iron ion binding; oxygen binding; flavonoid 3'-monooxygenase activity; demethylase activity; oxidoreductase activity, acting on paired donors, with incorporation or reduction of molecular oxygen, reduced flavin or flavoprotein as one donor, and incorporation of one atom of oxygen; metal ion binding; steroid hydroxylase activity; catalytic activity; protein binding; heme binding; oxidoreductase activity, acting on paired donors, with incorporation or reduction of molecular oxygen; enzyme binding; vitamin D 24-hydroxylase activity; oxidoreductase activity; aromatase activity; oxidoreductase activity, acting on diphenols and related substances as donors; monooxygenase activity; estrogen 16-alpha-hydroxylase activity; Hsp70 protein binding; Hsp90 protein binding
Cellular component	cytoplasm; organelle membrane; endoplasmic reticulum membrane; intracellular membrane-bounded organelle; membrane; endoplasmic reticulum; mitochondrion; mitochondrial inner membrane
Biological process	response to immobilization stress; maternal process involved in parturition; response to hypoxia; 9-cis-retinoic acid biosynthetic process; response to organic cyclic compound; coumarin metabolic process; vitamin D metabolic process; insecticide metabolic process; response to hyperoxia; response to antibiotic; demethylation; cellular response to organic cyclic compound; response to virus; ageing; hepatocyte differentiation; epoxygenase P450 pathway; dibenzo-p-dioxin catabolic process; response to arsenic-containing substance; response to organic substance; positive regulation of G1/S transition of mitotic cell cycle; response to vitamin A; response to lipopolysaccharide; omega-hydroxylase P450 pathway; response to wounding; dibenzo-p-dioxin metabolic process; response to nematode; response to iron(III) ion; flavonoid metabolic process; response to food; liver development; camera-type eye development; digestive tract development; cell population proliferation; response to herbicide; porphyrin-containing compound metabolic process; ethylene metabolic process; lipid hydroxylation; steroid metabolic process; cellular response to copper ion; amine metabolic process; toxin metabolic process; response to toxic substance; regulation of lipid metabolic process; heterocycle metabolic process; hydrogen peroxide biosynthetic process; developmental process; long-chain fatty acid biosynthetic process
Sources:Amigo / QuickGO
Orthologs
Databases	NCBI: entry; OMA: entry
Species	Human	Mouse
Entrez	1543	13076
Ensembl	ENSG00000140465	ENSMUSG00000032315
UniProt	P04798	P00184
RefSeq (mRNA)	NM_000499; NM_001319216; NM_001319217	NM_001136059; NM_009992
RefSeq (protein)	NP_000490; NP_001306145; NP_001306146	NP_001129531; NP_034122
Location (UCSC)	Chr 15: 74.72 – 74.73 Mb	Chr 9: 57.6 – 57.61 Mb
PubMed search
- Wikidata
View/Edit Human	View/Edit Mouse

Cytochrome P450, family 1, subfamily A, polypeptide 1 is a protein that in humans is encoded by the CYP1A1 gene. The protein is a member of the cytochrome P450 superfamily of enzymes.

== Function ==
=== Metabolism of xenobiotics and drugs ===
CYP1A1 is involved in phase I xenobiotic and drug metabolism (one substrate of it is theophylline). It is inhibited by hesperetin (a flavonoid found in lime, sweet orange), fluoroquinolones and macrolides and induced by aromatic hydrocarbons.

CYP1A1 is also known as AHH (aryl hydrocarbon hydroxylase). It is involved in the metabolic activation of aromatic hydrocarbons (polycyclic aromatic hydrocarbons, PAH), for example, benzo[a]pyrene (BaP), by transforming it to an epoxide. In this reaction, the oxidation of benzo[a]pyrene is catalysed by CYP1A1 to form BaP-7,8-epoxide, which can be further oxidized by epoxide hydrolase (EH) to form BaP-7,8-dihydrodiol. Finally, CYP1A1 catalyses this intermediate to form BaP-7,8-dihydrodiol-9,10-epoxide, which is a carcinogen.

However, an in vivo experiment with gene-deficient mice has found that the hydroxylation of benzo[a]pyrene by CYP1A1 can have an overall protective effect on the DNA, rather than contributing to potentially carcinogenic DNA modifications. This effect is likely due to the fact that CYP1A1 is highly active in the intestinal mucosa, and thus inhibits infiltration of ingested benzo[a]pyrene carcinogen into the systemic circulation.

CYP1A1 metabolism of various foreign agents to carcinogens has been implicated in the formation of various types of human cancer.

=== Metabolism of endogenous agents ===
CYP1A1 also metabolizes polyunsaturated fatty acids into signaling molecules that have physiological as well as pathological activities. CYP1A1 has monoxygenase activity in that it metabolizes arachidonic acid to 19-hydroxyeicosatetraenoic acid (19-HETE) (see 20-Hydroxyeicosatetraenoic acid) but also has epoxygenase activity in that it metabolizes docosahexaenoic acid to epoxides, primarily 19R,20S-epoxydocosapentaenoic acid and 19S,20R-epoxydocosapentaenoic acid isomers (termed 19,20-EDP) and similarly metabolizes eicosapentaenoic acid to epoxides, primarily 17R,18S-eicosatetraenoic acid and 17S,18R-eicosatetraenoic acid isomers (termed 17,18-EEQ). Synthesis of 12(S)-HETE by CYP1A1 has also been demonstrated. 19-HETE is an inhibitor of 20-HETE, a broadly active signaling molecule, e.g. it constricts arterioles, elevates blood pressure, promotes inflammation responses, and stimulates the growth of various types of tumor cells; however the in vivo ability and significance of 19-HETE in inhibiting 20-HETE has not been demonstrated.

The EDP (epoxydocosapentaenoic acid) and EEQ (epoxyeicosatetraenoic acid) metabolites have a broad range of activities. In various animal models and in vitro studies on animal and human tissues, they decrease hypertension and pain perception; suppress inflammation; inhibit angiogenesis, endothelial cell migration and endothelial cell proliferation; and inhibit the growth and metastasis of human breast and prostate cancer cell lines. It is suggested that the EDP and EEQ metabolites function in humans as they do in animal models and that, as products of the omega-3 fatty acids, docosahexaenoic acid and eicosapentaenoic acid, the EDP and EEQ metabolites contribute to many of the beneficial effects attributed to dietary omega-3 fatty acids. EDP and EEQ metabolites are short-lived, being inactivated within seconds or minutes of formation by epoxide hydrolases, particularly soluble epoxide hydrolase, and therefore act locally. CYP1A1 is one of the main extra-hepatic cytochrome P450 enzymes; it is not regarded as being a major contributor to forming the cited epoxides but could act locally in certain tissues such as the intestine and in certain cancers to do so.

== Regulation ==
The expression of the CYP1A1 gene, along with that of CYP1A2/1B1 genes, is regulated by a heterodimeric transcription factor that consist of the aryl hydrocarbon receptor, a ligand activated transcription factor, and the aryl hydrocarbon receptor nuclear translocator. In the intestine, but not the liver, CYP1A1 expression moreover depends on TOLL-like receptor 2 (TLR2), which recognizes bacterial surface structures such as lipoteichoic acid. Additionally, the tumour suppressor p53 has been shown to impact CYP1A1 expression thereby modulating the metabolic activation of several environmental carcinogens such as PAHs.

== Polymorphisms ==
Several polymorphisms have been identified in CYP1A1, some of which lead to more highly inducible AHH activity. CYP1A1 polymorphisms include:

- M1, T→C substitution at nucleotide 3801 in the 3'-non-coding region
- M2, A→G substitution at nucleotide 2455 leading to an amino acid change of isoleucine to valine at codon 462
- M3, T→C substitution at nucleotide 3205 in the 3'-non-coding region
- M4, C→A substitution at nucleotide 2453 leading to an amino acid change of threonine to asparagine at codon 461

The highly inducible forms of CYP1A1 are associated with an increased risk of lung cancer in smokers. (Reference = Kellerman et al., New Eng J Med 1973:289;934-937) Light smokers with the susceptible genotype CYP1A1 have a sevenfold higher risk of developing lung cancer compared to light smokers with the normal genotype.
