= CYP2E1 =

Enzyme found in humans

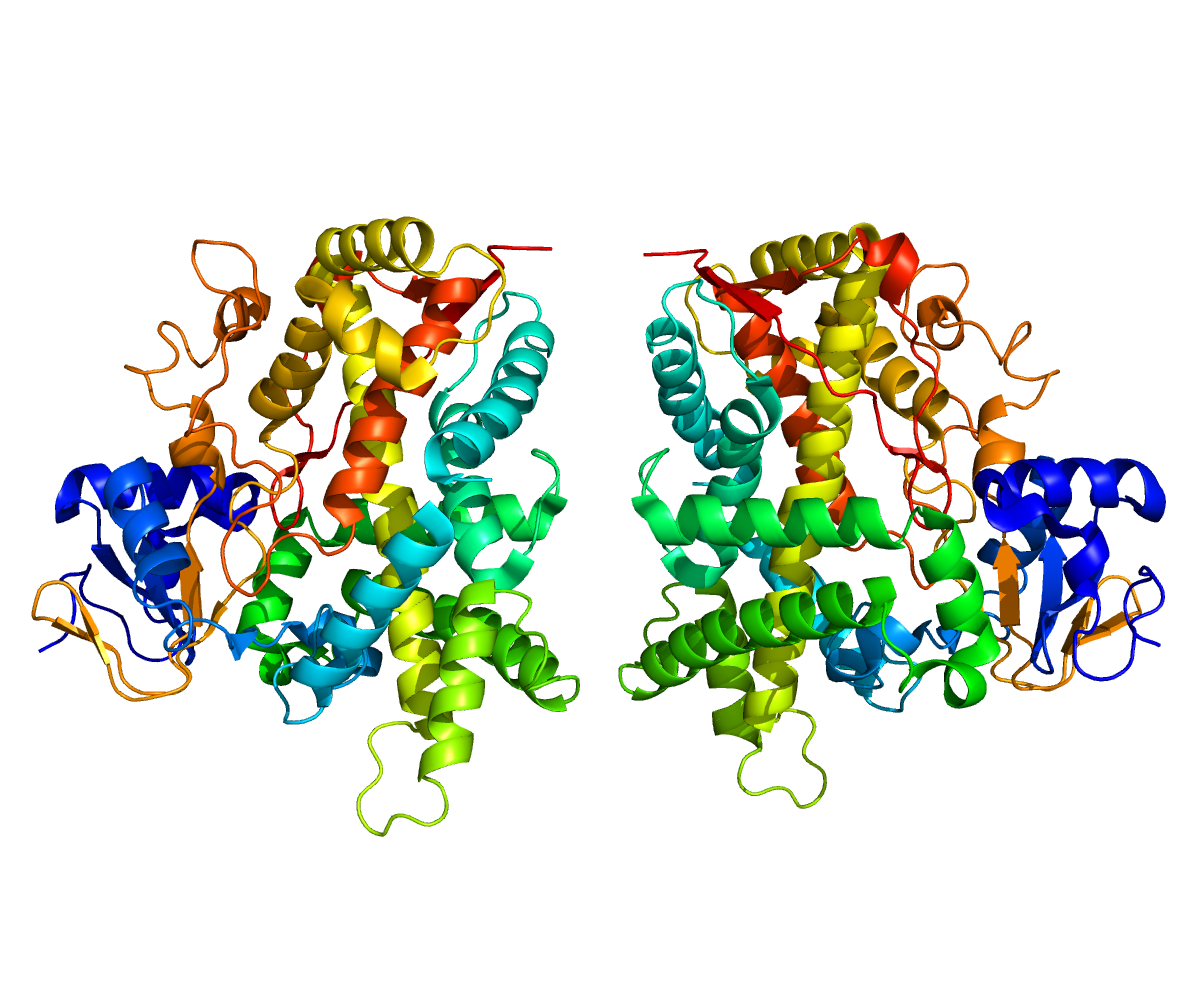

Identifiers
- Aliases: CYP2E1, CPE1, CYP2E, P450-J, P450C2E, cytochrome P450 family 2 subfamily E member 1
- External IDs: OMIM: 124040; MGI: 88607; GeneCards: CYP2E1
Available structures
PDB	Ortholog search: PDBe RCSB
PDB	List of PDB id codes 3E4E, 3E6I, 3GPH, 3KOH, 3LC4, 3T3Z
Enzyme activity
EC #	BRENDA	ExPASy	KEGG	MetaCyc
1.14.14.1	↗	↗	↗	↗

Gene location (Human)
Chr.	Chromosome 10 (human)
Band	10q26.3	Start	133,520,406 bp
Band	10q26.3	End	133,561,220 bp

Gene location (Mouse)
Chr.	Chromosome 7 (mouse)
Band	7 F4|7 85.94 cM	Start	140,343,652 bp
Band	7 F4|7 85.94 cM	End	140,354,900 bp
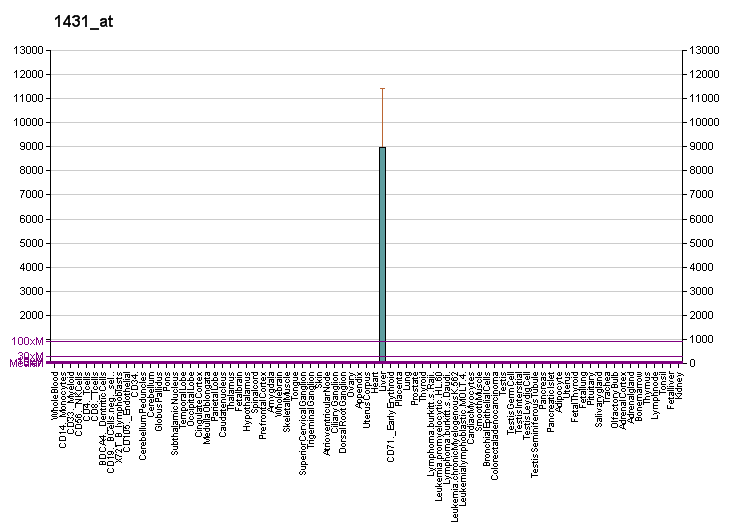

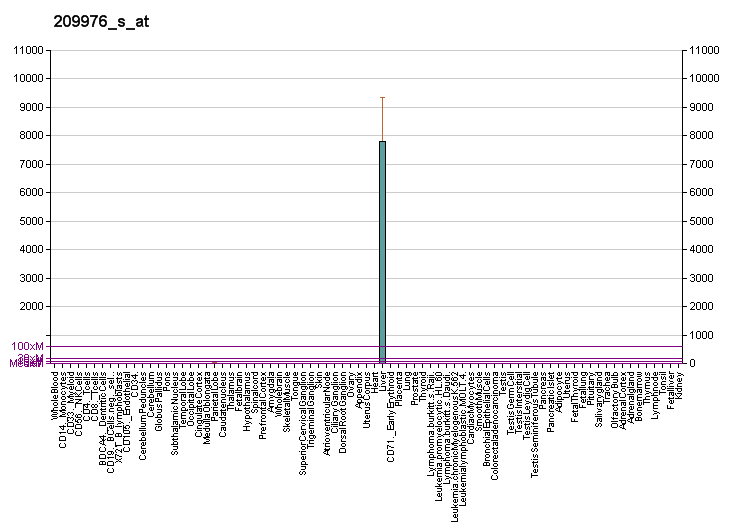

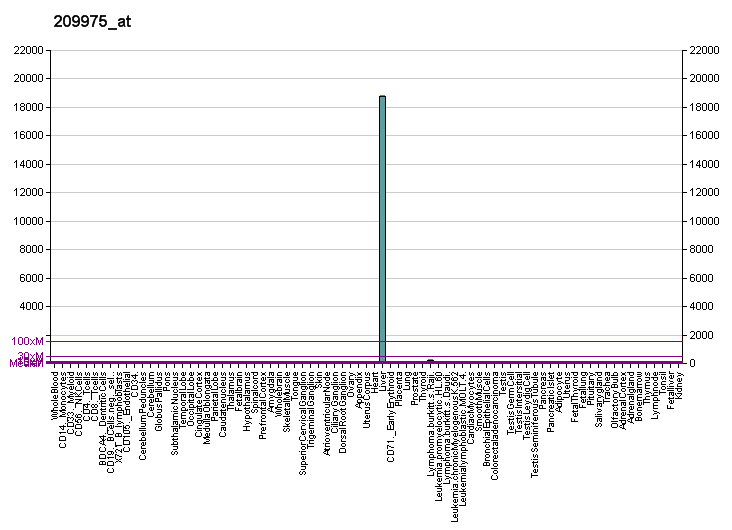
RNA expression pattern
Bgee	Human / Mouse (ortholog); Top expressed in: right lobe of liver; right hemisphere of cerebellum; body of pancreas; right frontal lobe; right uterine tube; skin of leg; skin of abdomen; endothelial cell; middle temporal gyrus; Brodmann area 9 / Top expressed in: left lobe of liver; tunica adventitia of aorta; white adipose tissue; right kidney; lactiferous gland; subcutaneous adipose tissue; intercostal muscle; human kidney; ankle joint; tunica media of zone of aorta; More reference expression data
BioGPS	More reference expression data
Gene ontology
Molecular function	iron ion binding; oxygen binding; arachidonic acid epoxygenase activity; oxidoreductase activity, acting on paired donors, with incorporation or reduction of molecular oxygen, reduced flavin or flavoprotein as one donor, and incorporation of one atom of oxygen; metal ion binding; monooxygenase activity; heme binding; oxidoreductase activity, acting on paired donors, with incorporation or reduction of molecular oxygen; enzyme binding; oxidoreductase activity; oxidoreductase activity, acting on paired donors, with incorporation or reduction of molecular oxygen, NAD(P)H as one donor, and incorporation of one atom of oxygen; steroid hydroxylase activity; Hsp70 protein binding; Hsp90 protein binding
Cellular component	organelle membrane; endoplasmic reticulum membrane; intracellular membrane-bounded organelle; membrane; intrinsic component of endoplasmic reticulum membrane; Golgi membrane; endoplasmic reticulum; mitochondrion; cytoplasm; mitochondrial inner membrane
Biological process	steroid metabolic process; epoxygenase P450 pathway; response to ozone; heterocycle metabolic process; response to organonitrogen compound; monoterpenoid metabolic process; xenobiotic metabolic process; response to ethanol; triglyceride metabolic process; carbon tetrachloride metabolic process; halogenated hydrocarbon metabolic process; benzene metabolic process; long-chain fatty acid biosynthetic process; response to bacterium; organic acid metabolic process
Sources:Amigo / QuickGO
Orthologs
Databases	NCBI: entry; OMA: entry
Species	Human	Mouse
Entrez	1571	13106
Ensembl	ENSG00000130649	ENSMUSG00000025479
UniProt	P05181	Q05421
RefSeq (mRNA)	NM_000773	NM_021282
RefSeq (protein)	NP_000764	NP_067257
Location (UCSC)	Chr 10: 133.52 – 133.56 Mb	Chr 7: 140.34 – 140.35 Mb
PubMed search
- Wikidata
View/Edit Human	View/Edit Mouse

Cytochrome P450 2E1 (abbreviated CYP2E1, EC 1.14.13.n7) is a member of the cytochrome P450 mixed-function oxidase system, which is involved in the metabolism of xenobiotics in the body. This class of enzymes is divided up into a number of subcategories, including CYP1, CYP2, and CYP3, which as a group are largely responsible for the breakdown of foreign compounds in mammals.

While CYP2E1 itself carries out a relatively low number of these reactions (~4% of known P450-mediated drug oxidations), it and related enzymes CYP1A2 and CYP3A4 are responsible for the breakdown of many toxic environmental chemicals and carcinogens that enter the body, in addition to basic metabolic reactions such as fatty acid oxidations.

CYP2E1 protein localizes to the endoplasmic reticulum and is induced by ethanol, the diabetic state, and starvation. The enzyme metabolizes both endogenous substrates, such as ethanol, acetone, and acetal, as well as exogenous substrates including benzene, carbon tetrachloride, ethylene glycol, and nitrosamines which are premutagens found in cigarette smoke. Due to its many substrates, this enzyme may be involved in such varied processes as gluconeogenesis, hepatic cirrhosis, diabetes, and cancer.

== Function ==
CYP2E1 is a membrane protein expressed in high levels in the liver, where it composes nearly 50% of the total hepatic cytochrome P450 mRNA and 7% of the hepatic cytochrome P450 protein. The liver is therefore where most drugs undergo deactivation by CYP2E1, either directly or by facilitated excretion from the body.

CYP2E1 enzyme metabolizes mostly small, polar molecules, including toxic laboratory chemicals such as dimethylformamide, aniline, and halogenated hydrocarbons (see table below). While these oxidations are often of benefit to the body, certain carcinogens and toxins are bioactivated by CYP2E1, implicating the enzyme in the onset of hepatotoxicity caused by certain classes of drugs (see disease relevance section below).

CYP2E1 also plays a role in several important metabolic reactions, including the conversion of ethanol to acetaldehyde and to acetate in humans, where it works alongside alcohol dehydrogenase and aldehyde dehydrogenase. In the conversion sequence of acetyl-CoA to glucose, CYP2E1 transforms acetone via hydroxyacetone (acetol) into propylene glycol and methylglyoxal, the precursors of pyruvate, acetate and lactate.

CYP2E1 also carries out the metabolism of endogenous fatty acids such as the ω-1 hydroxylation of fatty acids such as arachidonic acid, involving it in important signaling pathways that may link it to diabetes and obesity. Thus, it acts as a monooxygenase to metabolize arachidonic acid to 19-hydroxyeicosatetraenoic acid (19-HETE) (see 20-Hydroxyeicosatetraenoic acid). However, it also acts as an epoxygenase activity to metabolize docosahexaenoic acid to epoxides, primarily 19R,20S-epoxyeicosapentaenoic acid and 19S,20R-epoxyeicosapentaenoic acid isomers (termed 19,20-EDP) and eicosapentaenoic acid to epoxides, primarily 17R,18S-eicosatetraenoic acid and 17S,18R-eicosatetraenoic acid isomers (termed 17,18-EEQ). 19-HETE is an inhibitor of 20-HETE, a broadly active signaling molecule, e.g. it constricts arterioles, elevates blood pressure, promotes inflammation responses, and stimulates the growth of various types of tumor cells; however the in vivo ability and significance of 19-HETE in inhibiting 20-HETE has not been demonstrated. The EDP (epoxydocosapentaenoic acid) and EEQ (epoxyeicosatetraenoic acid) metabolites have a broad range of activities. In various animal models and in vitro studies on animal and human tissues, they decrease hypertension and pain perception; suppress inflammation; inhibit angiogenesis, endothelial cell migration and endothelial cell proliferation; and inhibit the growth and metastasis of human breast and prostate cancer cell lines. It is suggested that the EDP and EEQ metabolites function in humans as they do in animal models and that, as products of the omega-3 fatty acids, docosahexaenoic acid and eicosapentaenoic acid, the EDP and EEQ metabolites contribute to many of the beneficial effects attributed to dietary omega-3 fatty acids. EDP and EEQ metabolites are short-lived, being inactivated within seconds or minutes of formation by epoxide hydrolases, particularly soluble epoxide hydrolase, and therefore act locally. CYP2E1 is not regarded as being a major contributor to forming the cited epoxides but could act locally in certain tissues to do so.

=== Substrates ===
Following is a table of selected substrates of CYP2E1. Where classes of agents are listed, there may be exceptions within the class.

Selected substrates of CYP2E1
Substrates
- anaesthetics:
  - halothane
  - enflurane
  - isoflurane
  - methoxyflurane
  - sevoflurane
- paracetamol (acetaminophen) - used as analgesic, antipyretic - toxication by CYP2E1
- ethanol (psychoactive)
- Industrial potentially toxic substances
  - aniline
  - benzene
  - dimethylformamide
- theophylline (stimulant, active metabolite of caffeine)
- chlorzoxazone (muscle relaxant)
- zopiclone and eszopiclone (sedative/hypnotics)
- verapamil (minor/moderate sensitive substrates)

== Structure ==
CYP2E1 exhibits structural motifs common to other human membrane-bound cytochrome P450 enzymes, and is composed of 12 major α-helices and 4 β-sheets with short intervening helices interspersed between the two. Like other enzymes of this class, the active site of CYP2E1 contains an iron atom bound by a heme center which mediates the electron transfer steps necessary to carry out oxidation of its substrates. The active site of CYP2E1 is the smallest observed in human P450 enzymes, with its small capacity attributed in part to the introduction of an isoleucine at position 115. The side-chain of this residue protrudes out above the heme center, restricting active site volume compared to related enzymes that have less bulky residues at this position. T^{303}, which also protrudes into the active site, is particularly important for substrate positioning above the reactive iron center and is hence highly conserved by many cytochrome P450 enzymes. Its hydroxyl group is well-positioned to donate a hydrogen bond to potential acceptors on the substrate, and its methyl group has also been implicated in the positioning of fatty acids within the active site. A number of residues proximal to the active site including L^{368} help make up a constricted, hydrophobic access channel which may also be important for determining the enzyme's specificity towards small molecules and ω-1 hydroxylation of fatty acids.

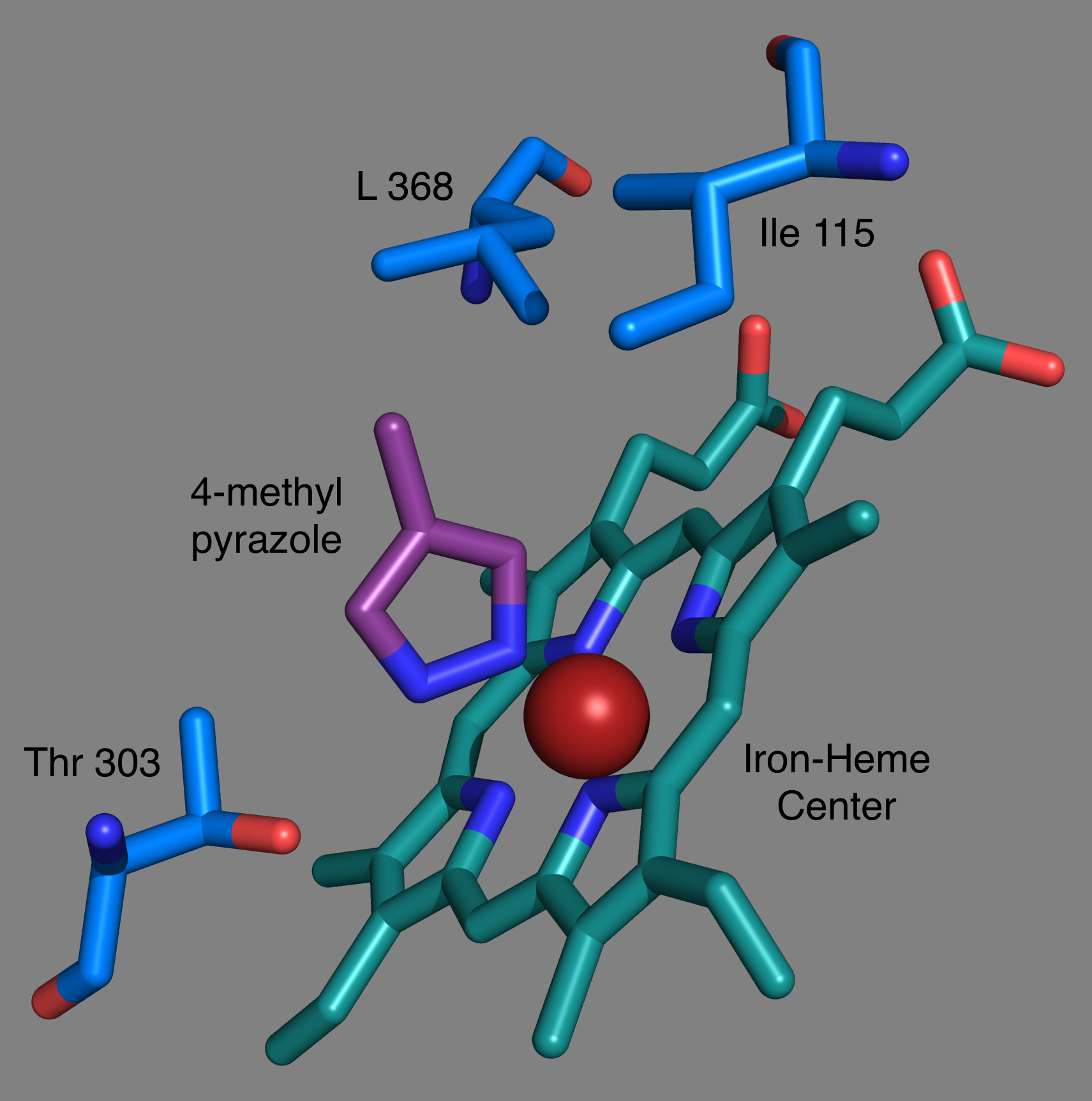
Selected residues in the active site of CYP2E1. Created using 3E4E (bound to inhibitor 4-methyl pyrazole).

== Regulation ==
=== Genetic regulation ===
In humans, the CYP2E1 enzyme is encoded by the CYP2E1 gene. The enzyme has been identified in fetal liver, where it is posited to be the predominant ethanol-metabolizing enzyme, and may be connected to ethanol-mediated teratogenesis. In rats, within one day of birth the hepatic CYP2E1 gene is activated transcriptionally.

CYP2E1 expression is easily inducible, and can occur in the presence of a number of its substrates, including ethanol, isoniazid, tobacco, isopropanol, benzene, toluene, and acetone. For ethanol specifically, it seems that there exist two stages of induction, a post-translational mechanism for increased protein stability at low levels of ethanol and an additional transcriptional induction at high levels of ethanol.

=== Chemical regulation ===
CYP2E1 is inhibited by a variety of small molecules, many of which act competitively. Two such inhibitors, indazole and 4-methylpyrazole, coordinate with the active site's iron atom and were crystallized with recombinant human CYP2E1 in 2008 to give the first true crystal structures of the enzyme. Other inhibitors include diethyldithiocarbamate (in cancer), and disulfiram (in alcoholism).

== Disease relevance ==
CYP2E1 is expressed in high levels in the liver, where it works to clear toxins from the body. In doing so, CYP2E1 bioactivates a variety of common anesthetics, including paracetamol (acetaminophen), halothane, enflurane, and isoflurane. The oxidation of these molecules by CYP2E1 can produce harmful substances such as trifluoroacetic acid chloride from halothane or NAPQI from paracetamol (acetaminophen) and is a major reason for their observed hepatotoxicity in patients.

CYP2E1 and other cytochrome P450 enzymes can inadvertently produce reactive oxygen species (ROS) in their active site when catalysis is not coordinated correctly, resulting in potential lipid peroxidation as well as protein and DNA oxidation. CYP2E1 is particularly susceptible to this phenomenon compared to other P450 enzymes, suggesting that its expression levels may be important for negative physiological effects observed in a number of disease states.

CYP2E1 expression levels have been correlated with a variety of dietary and physiological factors, such as ethanol consumption, diabetes, fasting, and obesity. It appears that cellular levels of the enzyme may be controlled by the molecular chaperone HSP90, which upon association with CYP2E1 allows for transport to the proteasome and subsequent degradation. Ethanol and other substrates may disrupt this association, leading to the higher expression levels observed in their presence. The increased expression of CYP2E1 accompanying these health conditions may therefore contribute to their pathogenesis by increasing the rate of production of ROS in the body.

According to a 1995 publication by Y Hu et al., a study in rats revealed a 8- to 9-fold elevation of CYP2E1 with fasting alone, compared to a 20-fold increase in enzyme level accompanied by a 16-fold increase in total catalytic capacity in rats who were both fasted and given large quantities of ethanol for 3 consecutive days. Starvation appears to upregulate CYP2E1 mRNA production in liver cells while alcohol seems to stabilize the enzyme itself post-translation and thus protect it from degradation by normal cellular proteolytic processes, giving the two an independent synergistic effect.

== Applications ==
Trees have been genetically engineered to overexpress rabbit CYP2E1 enzyme. These transgenic trees have been used to remove pollutants from groundwater, a process known as phytoremediation.

== See also ==
- Cytochrome
- Metabolism
- List of cytochrome P450 modulators
