= CYP4F8 =

Protein-coding gene in the species Homo sapiens

Identifiers
- Aliases: CYP4F8, CPF8, CYPIVF8, cytochrome P450 family 4 subfamily F member 8
- External IDs: OMIM: 611545; MGI: 2146921; GeneCards: CYP4F8
Enzyme activity
EC #	BRENDA	ExPASy	KEGG	MetaCyc
1.14.14.1	↗	↗	↗	↗

Gene location (Human)
Chr.	Chromosome 19 (human)
Band	19p13.12	Start	15,615,218 bp
Band	19p13.12	End	15,630,639 bp

Gene location (Mouse)
Chr.	Chromosome 17 (mouse)
Band	17|17 B1	Start	32,904,601 bp
Band	17|17 B1	End	32,922,326 bp
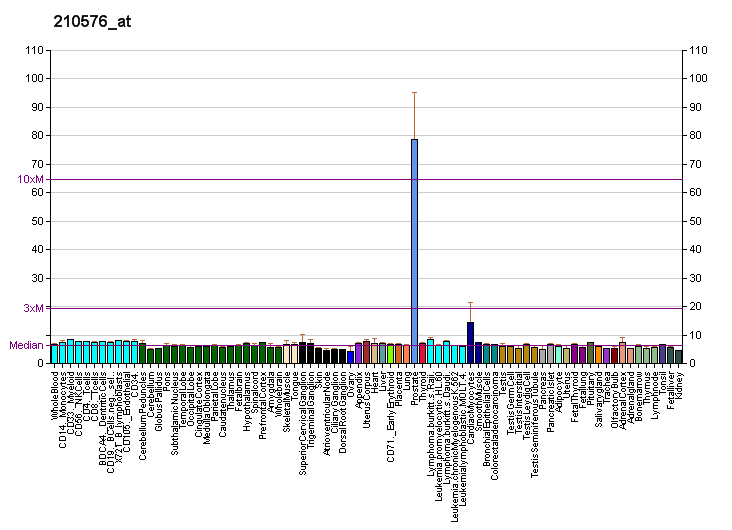
RNA expression pattern
Bgee	Human / Mouse (ortholog); Top expressed in: seminal vesicula; skin of thigh; vulva; skin of abdomen; skin of arm; prostate; sperm; right uterine tube; nipple; urinary bladder / Top expressed in: transitional epithelium of urinary bladder; left lobe of liver; superior frontal gyrus; primary visual cortex; embryo; respiratory epithelium; nasal epithelium; olfactory epithelium; embryo; dentate gyrus of hippocampal formation granule cell; More reference expression data
BioGPS	More reference expression data
Gene ontology
Molecular function	iron ion binding; oxidoreductase activity; aromatase activity; alkane 1-monooxygenase activity; heme binding; oxidoreductase activity, acting on paired donors, with incorporation or reduction of molecular oxygen; metal ion binding; monooxygenase activity
Cellular component	integral component of membrane; organelle membrane; endoplasmic reticulum membrane; endoplasmic reticulum; membrane; intracellular membrane-bounded organelle
Biological process	prostaglandin metabolic process; icosanoid metabolic process
Sources:Amigo / QuickGO
Orthologs
Databases	NCBI: entry; OMA: entry
Species	Human	Mouse
Entrez	11283	106648
Ensembl	ENSG00000186526	ENSMUSG00000073424
UniProt	P98187	n/a
RefSeq (mRNA)	NM_007253	NM_134127; NM_001346538
RefSeq (protein)	NP_009184	n/a
Location (UCSC)	Chr 19: 15.62 – 15.63 Mb	Chr 17: 32.9 – 32.92 Mb
PubMed search
- Wikidata
View/Edit Human	View/Edit Mouse

Cytochrome P450 4F8 is a protein that in humans is encoded by the CYP4F8 gene.

== Gene ==
This gene, CYP4F8, encodes a member of the cytochrome P450 superfamily of enzymes. The cytochrome P450 proteins are monooxygenases that catalyze many reactions involved in drug metabolism and the synthesis of cholesterol, steroids, and other lipids. This gene is part of a cluster of cytochrome P450 genes on chromosome 19. Another member of this family, CYP4F3, is located approximately 18 kb away.

== Tissue distribution ==
In addition to seminal vesicles, CYP4F8 is expressed in the kidney, prostate, epidermis, and corneal epithelium, and its mRNA has been detected in the retina. CYP4F8 is also greatly up-regulated in psoriatic skin.

== Function ==
The CYP4F8 protein localizes to the endoplasmic reticulum and functions as a 19-hydroxylase of the arachidonic acid metabolite prostaglandin H2 (PGH2), and the Dihomo-γ-linolenic acid metabolite PGH1. These activities are particularly relevant in the seminal vesicles, where these metabolic pathways may influence local prostaglandin signaling.

In addition to its ability to metabolize and presumably thereby to inactivate or reduce the activity of PGH2 and PGH1, CYP4F8 adds hydroxyl residues to carbons 18 and 19 of arachidonic acid and Dihomo-γ-linolenic acid, CYP458 possesses epoxygenase activity in that it metabolizes the omega-3 fatty acids, docosahexaenoic acid (DHA) and eicosapentaenoic acid, (EPA) to their corresponding epoxides, the epoxydocosapentaenoic acids (EDPs) and epoxyeicosatetraenoic acids (EEQs), respectively. The enzyme metabolizes DHA primarily to 19R,20S-epoxyeicosapentaenoic acid and 19S,20R-epoxyeicosapentaenoic acid isomers (termed 19,20-EDP) and EPA primarily to 17R,18S-eicosatetraenoic acid and 17S,18R-eicosatetraenoic acid isomers (termed 17,18-EEQ). 19-HETE is an inhibitor of 20-HETE, a broadly active signaling molecule which acts to constrict arterioles, elevate blood pressure, promote inflammation responses, and stimulates the growth of various types of tumor cells; however the in vivo ability and significance of 19-HETE in inhibiting 20-HETE has not been demonstrated (see 20-Hydroxyeicosatetraenoic acid). The EDPs (see Epoxydocosapentaenoic acid) and EEQs (see epoxyeicosatetraenoic acid) have a broad range of activities. In various animal models and in vitro studies on animal and human tissues, they decrease hypertension and pain perception; suppress inflammation; inhibit angiogenesis, endothelial cell migration and endothelial cell proliferation; and inhibit the growth and metastasis of human breast and prostate cancer cell lines. It is suggested that the EDP and EEQ metabolites function in humans as they do in animal models and that, as products of the omega-3 fatty acids, DHA acid and EPA, the EDP and EEQ metabolites contribute to many of the beneficial effects attributed to dietary omega-3 fatty acids. EDP and EEQ metabolites are short-lived, being inactivated within seconds or minutes of formation by epoxide hydrolases, particularly soluble epoxide hydrolase, and therefore act locally.

CYP4F8 has little activity in omega-hydroxylating leukotriene B4, prostaglandin D2, prostaglandin E2, prostaglandin E1, or prostaglandin F2.

The fatty acid metabolizing activity, including the ability to form epoxides, of CYP4F8 is very similar to that of CYP4F12. However, it and CYP4F12 are not regarded as being major contributors in forming the cited epoxides in humans although they might do so in tissues where they are highly expressed.
