= CYP2C8 =

Gene-coded protein involved in metabolism of xenobiotics

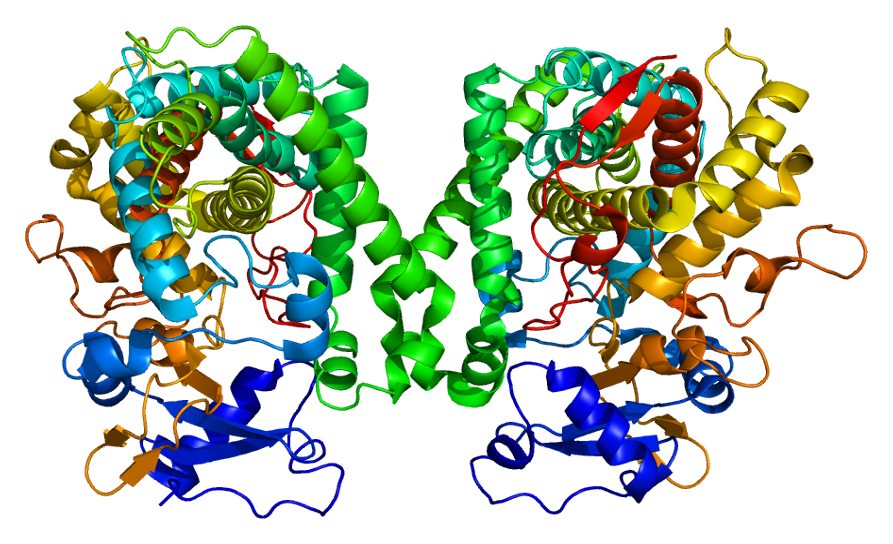

Identifiers
- Aliases: CYP2C8, CPC8, CYPIIC8, MP-12/MP-20, cytochrome P450 family 2 subfamily C member 8, CYP2C8DM
- External IDs: OMIM: 601129; MGI: 1306818; GeneCards: CYP2C8
Available structures
PDB	Ortholog search: PDBe RCSB
PDB	List of PDB id codes 2VN0, 1PQ2, 2NNH, 2NNI, 2NNJ
Enzyme activity
EC #	BRENDA	ExPASy	KEGG	MetaCyc
1.14.14.1	↗	↗	↗	↗

Gene location (Human)
Chr.	Chromosome 10 (human)
Band	10q23.33	Start	95,036,772 bp
Band	10q23.33	End	95,069,497 bp

Gene location (Mouse)
Chr.	Chromosome 19 (mouse)
Band	19|19 C3	Start	39,499,306 bp
Band	19|19 C3	End	39,556,973 bp
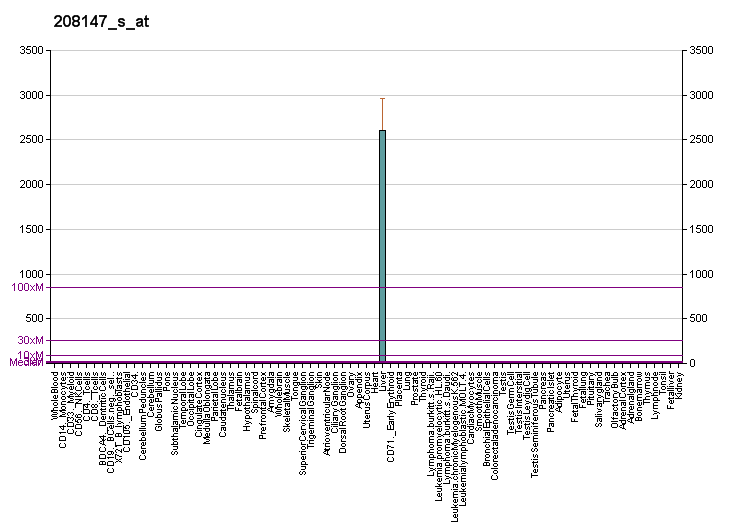
RNA expression pattern
Bgee	Human / Mouse (ortholog); Top expressed in: right lobe of liver; sperm; pancreatic ductal cell; right uterine tube; testicle; gallbladder; anterior pituitary; left adrenal cortex; gonad; body of stomach / Top expressed in: liver; thoracic diaphragm; More reference expression data
BioGPS	More reference expression data
Gene ontology
Molecular function	oxidoreductase activity, acting on paired donors, with incorporation or reduction of molecular oxygen; caffeine oxidase activity; aromatase activity; oxidoreductase activity; heme binding; metal ion binding; iron ion binding; arachidonic acid epoxygenase activity; monooxygenase activity; estrogen 16-alpha-hydroxylase activity; steroid hydroxylase activity; oxidoreductase activity, acting on paired donors, with incorporation or reduction of molecular oxygen, reduced flavin or flavoprotein as one donor, and incorporation of one atom of oxygen
Cellular component	endoplasmic reticulum; organelle membrane; membrane; intracellular membrane-bounded organelle; endoplasmic reticulum membrane; cytoplasm
Biological process	omega-hydroxylase P450 pathway; organic acid metabolic process; epoxygenase P450 pathway; oxidative demethylation; xenobiotic metabolic process; lipid hydroxylation; steroid metabolic process; long-chain fatty acid biosynthetic process; estrogen metabolic process
Sources:Amigo / QuickGO
Orthologs
Databases	NCBI: entry; OMA: entry
Species	Human	Mouse
Entrez	1558	13098
Ensembl	ENSG00000138115	ENSMUSG00000025003
UniProt	P10632	P56656
RefSeq (mRNA)	NM_000770; NM_001198853; NM_001198854; NM_001198855; NM_030878	NM_010003; NM_001373937
RefSeq (protein)	NP_000761; NP_001185782; NP_001185783; NP_001185784	NP_034133; NP_001360866
Location (UCSC)	Chr 10: 95.04 – 95.07 Mb	Chr 19: 39.5 – 39.56 Mb
PubMed search
- Wikidata
View/Edit Human	View/Edit Mouse

Cytochrome P_{450}2C8 (CYP2C8) is a member of the cytochrome P450 mixed-function oxidase system involved in the metabolism of xenobiotics in the body. Cytochrome P_{450}2C8 also possesses epoxygenase activity, i.e. it metabolizes long-chain polyunsaturated fatty acids, e.g. arachidonic acid, eicosapentaenoic acid, docosahexaenoic acid, and linoleic acid to their biologically active epoxides.

== Ligands ==
Following is a table of selected substrates, inducers and inhibitors of 2C8.

Inhibitors of CYP2C8 can be classified by their potency, such as:

- Strong inhibitor being one that causes at least a five-fold increase in the plasma AUC values, or more than 80% decrease in clearance.
- Moderate inhibitor being one that causes at least a two-fold increase in the plasma AUC values, or 50-80% decrease in clearance.
- Weak inhibitor being one that causes at least a 1.25-fold but less than two-fold increase in the plasma AUC values, or 20-50% decrease in clearance.

Selected inducers, inhibitors and substrates of CYP2C8
Substrates	Inhibitors	Inducers
amodiaquine (antimalarial, anti-inflammatory); cerivastatin (statin); enzalutamide (antiandrogen); paclitaxel (chemotherapeutic); repaglinide (antidiabetic); torasemide (loop diuretic); sorafenib (tyrosine kinase inhibitor); rosiglitazone (antidiabetic) - converted to active metabolites; buprenorphine (semisynthetic opioid); polyunsaturated fatty acids; montelukast (leukotriene receptor antagonist)	Strong: gemfibrozil (hypolipidemic); the acyl-β-glucuronide metabolite of clopidogrel (antiplatelet); Moderate: trimethoprim (antibiotic); Unspecified potency: thiazolidinediones (antidiabetic); montelukast (leukotriene receptor antagonist); quercetin (antiinflammatory)	Unspecified potency: rifampicin (antibiotic)

Where classes of agents are listed, there may be exceptions within the class.

== Epoxygenase activity ==
CYP2C8 also possesses epoxygenase activity: it is one of the principal enzymes responsible for attacking various long-chain polyunsaturated fatty acids at their double (i.e. alkene) bonds to form epoxide products that act as signaling agents. It metabolizes: 1) arachidonic acid to various epoxyeicosatrienoic acids (also termed EETs); 2) linoleic acid to 9,10-epoxy octadecenoic acids (also termed vernolic acid, linoleic acid 9:10-oxide, or leukotoxin) and 12,13-epoxy-octadecenoic (also termed coronaric acid, linoleic acid 12,13-oxide, or isoleukotoxin); 3) docosahexaenoic acid to various epoxydocosapentaenoic acids (also termed EDPs); and 4) eicosapentaenoic acid to various epoxyeicosatetraenoic acids (also termed EEQs).

Along with CYP2C8, CYP2C9, CYP2C19, CYP2J2, and possibly CYP2S1 are the main producers of EETs and, very likely, EEQs, EDPs, and the epoxides of linoleic acid.

== See also ==
- Cytochrome P450 oxidase
- Epoxygenase
