= CYP4F12 =

Protein-coding gene in the species Homo sapiens

Identifiers
- Aliases: CYP4F12, CYPIVF12, F22329_1, cytochrome P450 family 4 subfamily F member 12
- External IDs: OMIM: 611485; MGI: 1927669; GeneCards: CYP4F12
Enzyme activity
EC #	BRENDA	ExPASy	KEGG	MetaCyc
1.14.14.1	↗	↗	↗	↗

Gene location (Human)
Chr.	Chromosome 19 (human)
Band	19p13.12	Start	15,673,018 bp
Band	19p13.12	End	15,697,174 bp

Gene location (Mouse)
Chr.	Chromosome 17 (mouse)
Band	17|17 B1	Start	33,124,044 bp
Band	17|17 B1	End	33,136,316 bp
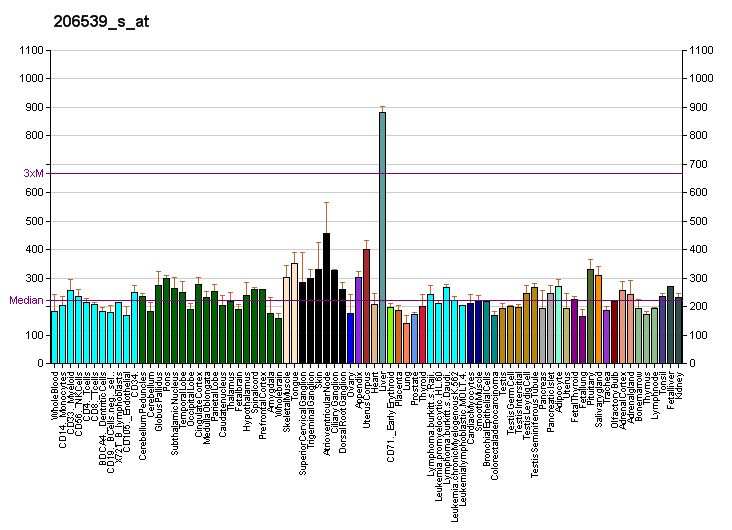
RNA expression pattern
Bgee	Human / Mouse (ortholog); Top expressed in: mucosa of transverse colon; mucosa of ileum; right lobe of liver; duodenum; skin of abdomen; skin of leg; jejunal mucosa; rectum; gingival epithelium; nasal epithelium / Top expressed in: intestinal villus; jejunum; left lobe of liver; duodenum; Paneth cell; ileum; crypt of lieberkuhn of small intestine; adrenal gland; visual cortex; left colon; More reference expression data
BioGPS	More reference expression data
Gene ontology
Molecular function	oxidoreductase activity, acting on paired donors, with incorporation or reduction of molecular oxygen; alkane 1-monooxygenase activity; aromatase activity; oxidoreductase activity; leukotriene-B4 20-monooxygenase activity; heme binding; metal ion binding; iron ion binding; arachidonic acid epoxygenase activity; monooxygenase activity
Cellular component	endoplasmic reticulum; apical plasma membrane; cytoplasm; organelle membrane; integral component of membrane; membrane; endoplasmic reticulum membrane; intracellular membrane-bounded organelle
Biological process	arachidonic acid metabolic process; pressure natriuresis; vitamin E metabolic process; epoxygenase P450 pathway; long-chain fatty acid metabolic process; leukotriene B4 catabolic process; very long-chain fatty acid metabolic process; sodium ion homeostasis; renal water homeostasis
Sources:Amigo / QuickGO
Orthologs
Databases	NCBI: entry; OMA: entry
Species	Human	Mouse
Entrez	66002	64385
Ensembl	ENSG00000186204	ENSMUSG00000024292
UniProt	Q9HCS2	Q9EP75
RefSeq (mRNA)	NM_023944	NM_001204333; NM_001204334; NM_001204335; NM_001204336; NM_022434 NM_001357788
RefSeq (protein)	NP_076433	NP_001191262; NP_001191263; NP_001191264; NP_001191265; NP_071879 NP_001344717
Location (UCSC)	Chr 19: 15.67 – 15.7 Mb	Chr 17: 33.12 – 33.14 Mb
PubMed search
- Wikidata
View/Edit Human	View/Edit Mouse

Cytochrome P450 4F12 is a protein that, in humans, is encoded by the CYP4F12 gene.

== Gene family ==
The CYP4F12 gene encodes a member of the cytochrome P450 superfamily of enzymes. It is located within a cluster of P450 genes on chromosome 19. Cytochrome P450 proteins are monooxygenases that catalyze a wide array of reactions involved in drug metabolism and in the synthesis of cholesterol, steroids, and other lipids.

== Expression and localization ==
CYP4F12 is thought to localize to the endoplasmic reticulum. It is expressed in the liver and throughout the gastrointestinal tract. The enzyme is known to metabolize the antihistamines ebastine and terfenadine, suggesting it may play a role in the metabolism of these and other drugs.

== Substrate specificity ==
When expressed in yeast, CYP4F12 oxidizes arachidonic acid by hydroxylating carbon 18 or 19 to form 18-HETE or 19-HETE, respectively, though the physiological significance of this activity remains unclear. It also metabolizes prostaglandin H2 (PGH2) and PGH1 to their 19-hydroxyl analogs, potentially reducing their biological activity.

In addition to monooxygenase activity, CYP4F12 also functions as an epoxygenase. It metabolizes docosahexaenoic acid (DHA) and eicosapentaenoic acid (EPA), two omega-3 fatty acids, to produce epoxide derivatives: DHA → 19R,20S- and 19S,20R-epoxydocosapentaenoic acids (19,20-EDP) EPA → 17R,18S- and 17S,18R-epoxyeicosatetraenoic acids (17,18-EEQ).

== Function ==
19-HETE, one of CYP4F12’s products, inhibits the activity of 20-HETE, a pro-inflammatory and vasoconstrictive signaling molecule. However, the in vivo importance of this inhibition has yet to be confirmed (see 20-Hydroxyeicosatetraenoic acid). EDPs (see Epoxydocosapentaenoic acid) and EEQs (see epoxyeicosatetraenoic acid) exhibit a wide range of biological activities in animal models and in vitro systems:

- Lower blood pressure and pain perception
- Suppress inflammation
- Inhibit angiogenesis, endothelial cell migration and proliferation]
- Inhibit growth and metastasis of breast and prostate cancer cell lines]

These findings suggest that EDPs and EEQs may contribute to the beneficial effects of dietary omega-3 fatty acids such as DHA and EPA in humans. These metabolites are short-lived and are rapidly inactivated by epoxide hydrolases, particularly soluble epoxide hydrolase, limiting their action to local environments.

== Comparison with CYP4F8 ==
CYP4F12 shares similar enzymatic activity with CYP4F8, particularly in fatty acid metabolism and epoxide formation. However, neither enzyme is considered a major contributor to these processes in humans, although they may play important roles in tissues where they are highly expressed.
