= CYP2J2 =

Protein found in humans

Identifiers
- Aliases: CYP2J2, CPJ2, CYPIIJ2, cytochrome P450 family 2 subfamily J member 2
- External IDs: OMIM: 601258; MGI: 1270148; GeneCards: CYP2J2
Enzyme activity
EC #	BRENDA	ExPASy	KEGG	MetaCyc
1.14.14.73	↗	↗	↗	↗
1.14.14.74	↗	↗	↗	↗
5.4.4.7	↗	↗	↗	↗

Gene location (Mouse)
Chr.	Chromosome 4 (mouse)
Band	4 C5|4 44.62 cM	Start	96,404,375 bp
Band	4 C5|4 44.62 cM	End	96,441,898 bp
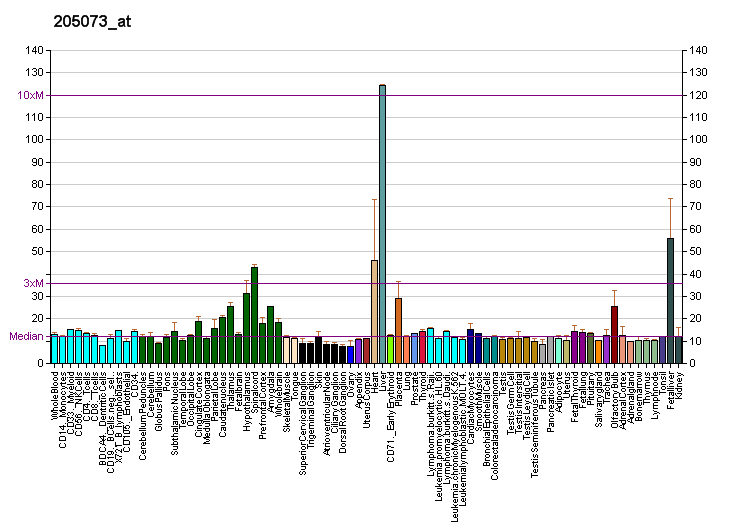
RNA expression pattern
Bgee	Human / Mouse (ortholog); n/a / Top expressed in: saccule; pyloric antrum; epithelium of small intestine; epithelium of stomach; jejunum; mucous cell of stomach; otic vesicle; nose; olfactory epithelium; duodenum
BioGPS	More reference expression data
Gene ontology
Molecular function	iron ion binding; oxidoreductase activity, acting on paired donors, with incorporation or reduction of molecular oxygen, reduced flavin or flavoprotein as one donor, and incorporation of one atom of oxygen; metal ion binding; arachidonic acid 14,15-epoxygenase activity; heme binding; oxidoreductase activity, acting on paired donors, with incorporation or reduction of molecular oxygen; arachidonic acid 11,12-epoxygenase activity; oxidoreductase activity; aromatase activity; linoleic acid epoxygenase activity; monooxygenase activity; arachidonic acid epoxygenase activity; steroid hydroxylase activity
Cellular component	organelle membrane; endoplasmic reticulum membrane; membrane; intracellular membrane-bounded organelle; endoplasmic reticulum; extracellular exosome; cytoplasm
Biological process	linoleic acid metabolic process; regulation of heart contraction; epoxygenase P450 pathway; icosanoid metabolic process; xenobiotic metabolic process; organic acid metabolic process
Sources:Amigo / QuickGO
Orthologs
Databases	NCBI: entry; OMA: entry
Species	Human	Mouse
Entrez	1573	13110
Ensembl	ENSG00000134716	ENSMUSG00000052914
UniProt	P51589	O54750
RefSeq (mRNA)	n/a	NM_010008
RefSeq (protein)	NP_000766	NP_034138
Location (UCSC)	n/a	Chr 4: 96.4 – 96.44 Mb
PubMed search
- Wikidata
View/Edit Human	View/Edit Mouse

Cytochrome P450 2J2 (CYP2J2) is a protein that in humans is encoded by the CYP2J2 gene. CYP2J2 is a member of the cytochrome P450 superfamily of enzymes. The enzymes are oxygenases which catalyze many reactions involved in the metabolism of drugs (and other xenobiotics) as well as in the synthesis of cholesterol, steroids and other lipids.

== Protein structure ==
The CYP2J2 contains the following domains:

• Hydrophobic binding domains

• F-G loop (containing non-conservative mutations) primary membrane binding motif

The protein also contains an N-terminal anchor.

=== F-G loop ===
The F-G loop mediates the binding and passage of substrates, and its hydrophobic region containing residues Trp-235, Phe-239 and Ille-236 allows the enzyme to interact with cellular membranes. Mutations to hydrophilic residues in the F-G loop alter the binding mechanism by changing insertion depth of the enzyme into the membrane.

== Tissue distribution ==
CYP2J2 is expressed predominately in the heart and, to a lesser extent, in other tissues such as the liver, gastrointestinal tract, pancreas, lung, and central nervous system.

== Function ==
CYP2J2 localizes to the endoplasmic reticulum and is thought to be a prominent enzyme responsible for metabolizing endogenous polyunsaturated fatty acids to signaling molecules. It metabolizes arachidonic acid to the following eicosatrienoic acid epoxides (termed EETs): 5,6-epoxy-8Z,11Z,14Z-EET, 8,9-epoxy-8Z,11Z,14Z-EET, 11,12-epoxy-5Z,8Z,14Z-EET, and 14,15-epoxy-5Z,8Z,11Z-EET. CYP2J2 also metabolizes linoleic acid to 9,10-epoxy octadecenoic acids (also termed vernolic acid, linoleic acid 9:10-oxide, or leukotoxin) and 12,13-epoxy-octadecenoic (also termed coronaric acid, linoleic acid 12,13-oxide, or isoleukotoxin); docosahexaenoic acid to various epoxydocosapentaenoic acids (also termed EDPs); and eicosapentaenoic acid to various epoxyeicosatetraenoic acids (also termed EEQs).

CYP2J2, along with CYP219, CYP2C8, CYP2C9, and possibly CYP2S1 are the main producers of EETs and, very likely EEQs, EDPs, and the epoxides of linoleic acid.

== Animal studies ==
Animal model studies implicate the EETs, EDPs, and EEQs in regulating hypertension, the development of myocardial infarction and other damage to the heart, the growth of various cancers, inflammation, blood vessel formation, and pain perception; limited studies suggest but have not proven that these epoxides may function similarly in humans (see epoxyeicosatrienoic acid, epoxydocosapentaenoic acid, and epoxygenase pages). Vernolic and coronaric acids are potentially toxic, causing multiple organ failure and respiratory distress when injected into animals.

== Human studies ==
Tissue samples containing carcinomas were obtained from 130 subjects and analyzed for expression of CYP2J2. Increased detection of CYP2J2 mRNA and protein were evident in 77% of patient carcinoma cell lines. Cell proliferation was positively regulated by CYP2J2 and furthermore CYP2J2 was shown to promote tumor progression. There was also a greater amount of CYP2J2 mRNA in various tumor types, including esophageal adenocarcinoma, breast carcinoma, and stomach carcinoma compared to that of surrounding normal tissue.

The overexpression of CYP2J2 and its effects on carcinoma cells are also evident when EETs are administered exogenously, suggesting a link between the production of EETs and cancer progression. Furthermore, tumor progression increases at a faster rate in cell lines with over-expression of CYP2J2 compared to control cancer cell lines.

== Clinical significance ==
CYP2J2 is over-expressed in a number of cancers, and forced over-expression of CYP2J2 in human cancer cells lines accelerates proliferation and protects cells against apoptosis.

HETEs and EETs derived from CYP2J2 have also been shown to contribute to the proper functioning of the cardiovascular system and the regulation of the renal and pulmonary systems in humans. CYP2J2 is readily expressed in the cardiac myocytes and endothelial cells of the coronary artery where various EETs are produced. The presence of EETs relaxes vascular smooth muscle cells by hyperpolarizing the cell membrane, thus highlighting the protective anti-inflammatory function of CYP2J2 in the circulatory system. There is still conflict in studies on the effects of EETs in relation to the cardiovascular system. P450 enzymes have shown both positive and negative effects in the heart, and the production of EETs has been shown to produce vascular protective and vascular depressive mechanisms. The over-expression of CYP2J2 enhances the activation of mitoKATP, and is believed to confer a physiological benefit by altering the production of reactive oxygen species.
