= 12-Hydroxyheptadecatrienoic acid =

Chemical compound

Names
- Preferred IUPAC name (5Z,8E,10E,12S)-12-Hydroxyheptadeca-5,8,10-trienoic acid

Identifiers
CAS Number	54397-84-1
3D model (JSmol)	Interactive image
ChemSpider	4446265
ECHA InfoCard	100.161.462
IUPHAR/BPS	6159
PubChem CID	5283141
CompTox Dashboard (EPA)	DTXSID50969517
- InChI: InChI=1S/C17H28O3/c1-2-3-10-13-16(18)14-11-8-6-4-5-7-9-12-15-17(19)20/h5-8,11,14,16,18H,2-4,9-10,12-13,15H2,1H3,(H,19,20)/b7-5-,8-6+,14-11+/t16-/m0/s1 Key: KUKJHGXXZWHSBG-WBGSEQOASA-N; InChI=1/C17H28O3/c1-2-3-10-13-16(18)14-11-8-6-4-5-7-9-12-15-17(19)20/h5-8,11,14,16,18H,2-4,9-10,12-13,15H2,1H3,(H,19,20)/b7-5-,8-6+,14-11+/t16-/m0/s1 Key: KUKJHGXXZWHSBG-WBGSEQOABE
- SMILES: CCCCC[C@@H](/C=C/C=C/C/C=C\CCCC(=O)O)O

Properties
Chemical formula	C_{17}H_{28}O_{3}
Molar mass	280.408 g·mol^{−1}
- Except where otherwise noted, data are given for materials in their standard state (at 25 °C [77 °F], 100 kPa). Infobox references

12-Hydroxyheptadecatrienoic acid (also termed 12-HHT, 12(S)-hydroxyheptadeca-5Z,8E,10E-trienoic acid, or 12(S)-HHTrE) is a 17 carbon metabolite of the 20 carbon polyunsaturated fatty acid, arachidonic acid. 12-HHT is less ambiguously termed 12-(S)-hydroxy-5Z,8E,10E-heptadecatrienoic acid to indicate the S stereoisomerism of its 12-hydroxyl residue and the Z, E, and E cis–trans isomerism of its three double bonds. 12-HHT was discovered and structurally defined in 1973 by Paulina Wlodawer, Bengt Samuelsson, and Mats Hamberg. It was identified as a product of arachidonic acid metabolism made by microsomes isolated from sheep seminal vesicle glands and by intact human platelets. 12-HHT was for many years thought to be merely a biologically inactive byproduct of prostaglandin synthesis. More recent studies, however, have attached potentially important activity to it.

== Production ==
=== Primary source ===
Cyclooxygenase-1 and cyclooxygenase-2 metabolize arachidonic acid to the 15-hydroperoxy, 20 carbon prostaglandin (PG) intermediate, PGG_{2}, and then to the 15-hydroxy, 20 carbon intermediate, prostaglandin H_{2} (PGH_{2}). Thromboxane synthase further metabolizes PGH_{2} to the 20 carbon product, thromboxane A_{2}, the 17 carbon product, 12-HHT, and the 3 carbon product, malonyldialdehyde. Platelets express cyclooxygenase and thromboxane synthase enzymes, producing PGG_{2}, PGH_{2}, and TXA_{2} in response to platelet aggregating agents such as thrombin; these metabolites act as autocrines by feeding back to promote further aggregation of their cells of origin and as paracrines by recruiting nearby platelets into the response as well as exerting effects on other nearby tissues such as contracting blood vessels. These effects combine to trigger blood clotting and limiting blood loss. 12-HHT is a particularly abundant product of these pro-clotting responses, accounting for about one third of the total amount of arachidonic acid metabolites formed by physiologically stimulated human platelets. Its abundant production during blood clotting, the presence of cyclooxygenases and to a lesser extent thromboxane synthase in a wide range of cell types and tissue, and its production by other pathways imply that 12-HHT has one or more important bioactivities relevant to clotting and, perhaps, other responses.

=== Other sources ===
Various cytochrome P450 enzymes (e.g. CYP1A1, CYP1A2, CYP1B1, CYP2E1, CYP2S1, and CYP3A4) metabolize PGG_{2} and PGH_{2} to 12-HHT and MDA. While the latter studies were conducted using recombinant cytochrome enzymes or sub-fractions of disrupted cells, the human monocyte, a form of blood circulating leukocyte, increases its expression of CYP2S1 when forced to differentiate into a macrophage phenotype by interferon gamma or lipopolysaccharide (i.e. endotoxin); associated with these changes, the differentiated macrophage metabolized arachidonic acid to 12-HHT by a CYP2S1-dependent mechanism. Future studies, therefore may show that cytochromes are responsible for 12-HHT and MDA production in vivo.

PGH_{2}, particularly in the presence of ferrous iron (FeII), ferric iron (FeIII), or hemin, rearranges non-enzymatically to a mixture of 12-HHT and 12-HHT's 8-cis isomer, i.e., 12-(S)-hydroxy-5Z,8Z,10E-heptadecatrienoic acid. This non-enzymatic pathway may explain findings that cells can make 12-HHT in excess of TXA2 and also in the absence of active cycloxygenase and/or thromboxane synthase enzymes.

== Further metabolism ==
12-HHT is further metabolized by 15-hydroxyprostaglandin dehydrogenase (NAD+) in a wide variety of human and other vertebrate cells to its 12-oxo (also termed 12-keto) derivative, 12-oxo-5Z,8E,10E-heptadecatrienoic acid (12-oxo-HHT or 12-keto-HHT). Pig kidney tissue also converted 12-HHT to 12-keto-5Z,8E-heptadecadienoic acid (12-oxo-5Z,8E-heptadecadienoic acid) and 12-hydroxy-heptadecadienoic acid.

Acidic conditions (pH~1.1–1.5) cause 12-HHT to rearrange in a time- and temperature-dependent process to its 5-cis isomer, 12-hydroxy-5E,8E,10E-heptadecatrienoic acid.

== Activities and clinical significance ==
=== Early studies ===
Fourteen years after the first publication on its detection in 1973, 12-HHT was reported to stimulate fetal bovine aortic and human umbilical vein endothelial cells to metabolize arachidonic acid to prostaglandin I_{2} (PGI_{2} or prostacyclin), a powerful inhibitor of platelet activation and stimulator of vasodilation (see Prostacyclin synthase). 12-HHT did not, however, alter arachidonic acid metabolism in human platelets. Shortly thereafter, 12-HHT was reported to inhibit the chemotaxis-blocking effect of a human monocyte-derived factor on human monocytes. 12-Oxo-HT, the immediate metabolite of 12-HHT, was reported to stimulate the chemotasis of human neutrophils and to inhibit platelet aggregation responses to various agents by stimulating platelets to raise their levels of cyclic adenosine monophosphate (cAMP), an intracellular signal that serves broadly to inhibit platelet activation. These studies were largely overlooked; in 1998 and 2007 publications, for example, 12-HHT was regarded as either inactive or without significant biological activity. Nonetheless, this early work suggested that 12-HHT may serve as a contributor to monocyte- and neutrophil-based inflammatory responses, and that 12-oxo-HT may serve as a counterpoise to platelet aggregation responses elicited or promoted by TXA_{2}. Relevant to the latter activity, a later study showed that this inhibitory effect was due to the ability of 12-oxo-HT to act as a partial antagonist of the thromboxane receptor: 12-oxo-HT blocks TXA_{2} binding to its receptor and thereby the responses of platelets and possibly other tissues to TXA_{2} as well as agents that depend on stimulating TXA_{2} production for their activity. Thus, 12-HHT forms simultaneously with, and by stimulating PGI_{2} production, inhibits TXA_{2}-mediated platelet activation responses while 12-oxo-HT blocks TXA_{2} receptor binding to reduce not only TXA_{2}-induced thrombosis and blood clotting but possibly also vasospasm and other actions of TXA_{2}. In this view, thromboxane synthase leads to the production of a broadly active arachidonic acid metabolite, TXA_{2}, plus two other arachidonic acid metabolites, 12-HHT and 12-oxo-HT, that serve indirectly to stimulate PGI_{2} production or directly as a receptor antagonist to moderate TXA_{2}'s action, respectively. This strategy may be essential for limiting the deleterious thrombotic and vasospastic activities of TXA_{2}.

=== 12-HHT is a BLT2 receptor agonist ===
Leukotriene B_{4} (LTB_{4}) is an arachidonic acid metabolite made by the 5-lipoxygenase enzyme pathway. It activates cells through both its high affinity (dissociation constant [Kd] of 0.5–1.5 nM) Leukotriene B4_{4} receptor 1 (BLT1 receptor) and its low affinity BLT2 receptor (Kd=23 nM); both receptors are G protein-coupled receptors that, when ligand-bound, activate cells by releasing the G_{q} alpha subunit and pertussis toxin-sensitive G_{i} alpha subunit from heterotrimeric G proteins. BLT1 receptor has a high degree of ligand-binding specificity: among a series of hydroxylated eicosanoid metabolites of arachidonic acid, it binds only LTB_{4}, 20-hydroxy-LTB_{4}, and 12-epi-LTB_{4}; among this same series, BLT2 receptor has far less specificity in that it binds not only LTB_{4}, 20-hydroxy-LTB_{4}, and 12-epi-LTB_{4}, but also 12(R)-HETE and 12(S)-HETE (i.e. the two stereoisomers of 12-hydroxyeicosatetraenoic acid) and 15(S)-HpETE and 15(S)-HETE (i.e. the two stereoisomers of 15-hydroxyicosatetraenoic acid). The BLT2 receptor's relative affinities for finding LTB_{4}, 12(S)-HETE, 12(S)-HpETE, 12(R)-HETE, 15(S)-HETE, and 20-hydroxy-LTB_{4} are ~100, 10, 10, 3, 3, and 1, respectively. All of these binding affinities are considered to be low and therefore indicating that some unknown ligand(s) might bind BLT2 with high affinity. In 2009, 12-HHT was found to bind to the BLT2 receptor with ~10-fold higher affinity than LTB_{4}; 12-HHT did not bind to the BLT1 receptor. Thus, the BLT1 receptor exhibits exquisite specificity, binding 5(S),12(R)-dihydroxy-6Z,8E,10E,14Z-eicosatetraenoic acid (i.e. LTB_{4}) but not LTB_{4}'s 12(S) or 6Z isomers while the BLT2 receptor exhibits a promiscuous finding pattern. Formyl peptide receptor 2 is a relevant and well-studied example of promiscuous receptors. Initially thought to be a second and low affinity receptor for the neutrophil tripeptide chemotactic factor, N-formyl-met-leu-phe, subsequent studies showed that it was a high affinity receptor for the arachidonic acid metabolite, lipoxin A_{4}, but also bound and was activated by a wide range of peptides, proteins, and other agents. BLT2 may ultimately prove to have binding specificity for a similarly broad range of agents.

The production of LTB_{4} and expression of BLT1 by human tissues are largely limited to bone marrow-derived cells such as the neutrophil, eosinophil, mast cell, and various types of lymphocytes and accordingly are regarded primarily as contributing to the many human defensive and pathological (ulcerative colitis, arthritis, asthma, etc.) inflammatory responses which are mediated by these cell types. Drugs that inhibit LTB_{4} production or binding to BLT1 are in use or development for the latter diseases. In contrast, the production of 12-HHT and expression of BLT2 receptors by human tissues is far wider and more robust than that of the LTB_{4}/BLT2 receptor axis. Recent studies indicate that the role(s) of the 12-HHT/BLT2 receptor axis in human physiology and pathology may be very different from those of the LTB_{4}/BLT1 axis.

=== Recent studies on 12-HHT/BLT2 receptor activities ===
==== Inflammation and allergy ====
12-HHT stimulates chemotactic responses in mouse bone marrow mast cells, which naturally express BLT2 receptors, as well as in Chinese hamster ovary cells made to express these receptors by transfection. These findings suggest that the 12-HHT/BLT2 receptor pathway may support the pro-inflammatory (i.e. chemotactic) actions of the LTB_{4}/BLT1 pathway.

On the other hand, the immortalized human skin cell line HaCaT expresses BLT2 receptors and responds to ultraviolet B (UVB) radiation by generating toxic reactive oxygen species which in turn cause the HaCaT cells to die by activating apoptotic pathways in a BLT2 receptor-dependent reaction. Topical treatment of mouse skin with a BLT2 receptor antagonist, LY255283, protects against UVB radiation-induced apoptosis and BLT2-overexpressing transgenic mice exhibited significantly more extensive skin apoptosis in response to UVB irradiation. Furthermore, 12-HHT inhibits HaCaT cells from synthesizing interleukin-6 (IL-6), a pro-inflammatory cytokine associated with cutaneous inflammation, in response to UVB radiation. These results suggest that the 12-HHT/BLT2 axis can act to suppress inflammation by promoting the orderly death of damaged cells and blocking IL-6 production. Opposition between the pro-inflammatory LTB_{4}/BLT1 and anti-inflammatory actions of the 12-HHT/BLT2 axes occurs in another setting. In a mice model of ovalbumin-induced allergic airway disease, 12-HHT and its companion cyclooxygenase metabolites, prostaglandin E_{2} and prostaglandin D_{2}, but not 12 other lipoxygenase or cycloxygenase metabolites, showed a statistically significantly increase in bronchoalveolar lavage fluid levels after intratracheal ovalbumin challenge; after this challenge, only 12-HHT, among the monitored BLT2 receptor-activating ligands (LTB_{4}, the 12(S) stereoisomer of 12-HETE, and 15(S)-HETE) attained levels capable of activating BLT2 receptors. Also, BLT2 knockout mice exhibited a greatly enhanced response to ovalbumin challenge. Finally, BLT2 receptor expression was significantly reduced in allergy-regulating CD4+ T cells from patients with asthma compared to healthy control subjects. Unlike LTB_{4} and its BLT1 receptor, which are implicated in contributing to allergen-based airway disease in mice and humans, 12-HHT and its BLT2 receptor appear to suppress this disease in mice and may do so in humans. While further studies to probe the role of the 12-HHT/BLT2 axis in human inflammatory and allergic diseases, the current studies indicate that 12-HHT, acting through BLT2, may serve to promote or limit, inflammatory and to promote allergic responses.

==== Wound healing ====
High dose aspirin treatment (which inhibits cyclooxygenases-1 and -2 to block their production of 12-HHT), thromboxane synthase knockout, and BLT2 receptor knockout, but not TXA_{2} receptor knockout, impair keratinocyte-based re-epithelialization and thereby closure of experimentally induced wounds in mice. A synthetic BLT2 receptor agonist accelerates wound closure not only in this mouse model but also in the db/db mouse model of obesity, diabetes, and dyslipidemia due to leptin receptor deficiency. 12-HHT accumulated in the wounds of the former mouse model. Companion studies using an in vitro scratch test assay indicated that 12-HHT stimulated human and mouse keratinocyte migration by a BLT2 receptor-dependent mechanism that involved the production of tumor necrosis factor α and metalloproteinases. These results indicate that the 12-HHT/BLT2 receptor axis is a critical contributor to wound healing in mice and possibly humans. The axis operates by recruiting the movement of keratinocytes to close the wound. This mechanism may underlie the suppression of wound healing that accompanies the high dose intake of aspirin and, based on mouse studies, other non-steroidal anti-inflammatory agents (NSAIDs) in humans. Synthetic BLT2 agonists may be useful for speeding the healing of chronic ulcerative wounds, particularly in patients with, for example diabetics, that have impaired wound healing.

=== Cancer ===
A large number of studies have associated BLT2 and, directly or by assumption, 12-HHT in the survival, growth, and/or spread of various human cancers. BLT2, also called leukotriene B_{4} receptor 2, is closely associated with 12-HHT in stimulation of metastasis (malignant behavior of tumor cells) in the following cancers:

- Breast cancer
- Prostate cancer
- Urinary bladder cancer
- Follicular thyroid cancer
- Renal cell carcinoma
- Transitional cell carcinoma
- Esophageal cancer
- Pancreatic cancer
- Colon cancer

== See also ==
- Leukotriene B_{4}
- Leukotriene B_{4} receptor 1
- Leukotriene B_{4} receptor 2
- 12-Hydroxyeicosatetraenoic acid
- 15-Hydroxyicosatetraenoic acid
