= Leukotriene B4 receptor 2 =

Protein-coding gene in humans

LTB4R2

Identifiers
- Aliases: LTB4R2, BLT2, BLTR2, JULF2, KPG_004, LTB4-R 2, LTB4-R2, NOP9, leukotriene B4 receptor 2
- External IDs: OMIM: 605773; MGI: 1888501; GeneCards: LTB4R2

Gene location (Human)
Chr.	Chromosome 14 (human)
Band	14q12	Start	24,305,734 bp
Band	14q12	End	24,312,053 bp

Gene location (Mouse)
Chr.	Chromosome 14 (mouse)
Band	14|14 C3	Start	55,998,885 bp
Band	14|14 C3	End	56,002,595 bp
RNA expression pattern
Bgee	Human / Mouse (ortholog); Top expressed in: skin of abdomen; mucosa of esophagus; skin of leg; granulocyte; monocyte; vagina; gonad; blood; spleen; sural nerve / Top expressed in: lip; embryo; embryo; jejunum; duodenum; esophagus; granulocyte; proximal tubule; skin of external ear; right kidney; More reference expression data
BioGPS	n/a
Gene ontology
Molecular function	G protein-coupled peptide receptor activity; G protein-coupled receptor activity; leukotriene receptor activity; signal transducer activity; leukotriene B4 receptor activity; galanin receptor activity
Cellular component	integral component of membrane; integral component of plasma membrane; membrane; nucleoplasm; plasma membrane
Biological process	chemotaxis; phospholipase C-activating G protein-coupled receptor signaling pathway; keratinocyte migration; negative regulation of adenylate cyclase activity; leukotriene signaling pathway; neuropeptide signaling pathway; signal transduction; G protein-coupled receptor signaling pathway; inflammatory response
Sources:Amigo / QuickGO
Orthologs
Databases	NCBI: entry; OMA: entry
Species	Human	Mouse
Entrez	56413	57260
Ensembl	ENSG00000213906; ENSG00000285203	ENSMUSG00000040432
UniProt	Q9NPC1	Q9JJL9
RefSeq (mRNA)	NM_019839; NM_001164692; NM_001164693	NM_020490
RefSeq (protein)	NP_001158164; NP_062813	NP_065236
Location (UCSC)	Chr 14: 24.31 – 24.31 Mb	Chr 14: 56 – 56 Mb
PubMed search
- Wikidata
View/Edit Human	View/Edit Mouse

Leukotriene B_{4} receptor 2, also known as BLT2, BLT2 receptor, and BLTR2, is an Integral membrane protein that is encoded by the LTB4R2 gene in humans and the Ltbr2 gene in mice.

Discovered several years after the leukotriene B_{4} receptor 1 (BLT1), BLT2 receptor binds leukotriene B_{4} (LTB_{4}) with far lower affinity than the BLT1 receptor does and therefore has been termed the low affinity LTB_{4} receptor. Sometime after its initial discovery, the BLT2 receptor was shown to bind and become activated by several other arachidonic acid metabolites, one of which, 12-hydroxyheptadecatrienoic acid (12-HHT), has 10- to 100-fold higher affinity for it than does LTB_{4}; 12-HHT fails to bind or activate BLT1 receptors. While BLT2 receptors have some actions similar to BLT1 receptors, they have other actions which clearly oppose those of BLT1 in regulating inflammation and allergic responses; BLT2 receptors also have actions that extend beyond those of BLT1 receptors. Laboratory, animal, and other pre-clinical studies suggest that BLT2 receptors may be involved not only in inflammation and allergy but also in human cancer.

== Function ==
BLT2 is a cell surface receptor that functions by recognizing, binding, and mediating responses to a particular set of messenger molecules or ligands. These messenger ligands are any one of a range of structurally different arachidonic acid metabolites made and released by nearby cells to act as paracrine signals for coordinating responses between cells or autocrine signals for modulating their parent cells' responses.

== Genes ==
Several years after their identification of a leukotriene B_{4} (LTB_{4}) receptor termed BLT1 or BLTR1 and encoded by the LTB4R1 gene, Shimizu and colleagues identified a second LTB_{4} receptor, BLT2 or BLTR2, encoded by the LTB4R2 gene. LTBR1 and LTBR2 encode for proteins with 45% amino acid identity that belong to the G protein-coupled receptor superfamily. The two genes form a cluster on human and mouse chromosome 14; in humans but not mice, this cluster has a very unusual configuration in that LTBR2's open reading frame overlaps the promoter and 5' untranslated region of LTBR1. The significance of this overlap is not known. Monkeys, rats, and dogs have also been shown to express LTB4R2 orthologs.

Two BLT2-like receptors, Blt2a and Blt2b, with 49% amino acid identity to each other and 34% and 29%, respectively, amino acid identities to human BLT2 have been cloned from zebrafish embryos. The latter citation presents a phylogenic tree on the amino acid relatedness of these two receptors as well as those from humans, monkeys, dogs, rats and mice to each other.

== Mechanism of action ==
BLT2 receptors, similar to BLT1 receptors, are G protein-coupled receptors that, when ligand-bound, activate G proteins that contain either the G_{i} alpha subunit and are therefore inhibited by pertussis toxin or the G_{q} alpha subunit and therefore not inhibited by pertussis toxin. (Pertussis toxin sensitivity is an imported test for G protein receptor linkages.) BLT2 receptors stimulate cells to transiently elevated cytosolic calcium ion concentrations, thereby activating calcium-activated intracellular signaling molecules; it also stimulates cells to activate extracellular signal-regulated kinases (ERKs), protein kinase B (also known as Akt), c-Jun N-terminal kinases (JNKs), Janus kinase (JAK)-STAT protein (i.e. signal transducer and activator of transcription), NADPH oxidase (NOX), and NF-κB pathways. One prominent cell-activating pathway involves BLT2 receptor activation of NOX2 or NOX1 with the subsequent production of reactive oxygen species which in turn activate the transcription inducing function of NF-κB.

== Tissue distribution ==
The human BLT2 receptor is expressed in a wide range of tissues including spleen, blood leukocytes, liver, ovary, pancreas, heart, prostate gland, testes, small intestine, kidney, lung, colon, thymus, muscle, and placenta; this contrasts with the BLT1 receptor which appears to have a more limited expression pattern including mainly circulating blood leukocytes and lymphocytes. The mouse Blt2 receptor also shows a more limited distribution pattern than the human BLT2 receptor, showing appreciable expression in the small intestine and skin, and low expression in the colon and spleen.

== Ligands ==
While initially defined as a low affinity receptor for the 5-lipoxygenase product of arachidonic acid metabolism, LTB_{4}, BLT2 binds and is activated by not only LTB_{4} but also the cycloxygenase–thromboxane synthase enzyme pathway of arachidonic acid metabolism, 12-hydroxyheptadecatrienoic acid (12-HHT) as well as by three products of the 12-lipoxygenase pathway of arachidonic acid metabolism, 12(S)-HETE, 12(S)-HpETE, and 12(R)-HETE (see 12-Hydroxyeicosatetraenoic acid), by a member of the 15-lipoxygenase pathway of arachidonic acid metabolism, 15(S)-HETE (see 15-Hydroxyicosatetraenoic acid), and by another member of the LTB_{4} family of arachidonic acid metabolites, 20-hydroxy-LTB_{4}; the relative BLT2 receptor-binding affinities of these 7 metabolites are ~1000, 100, 10, 10, 3, 3, and 1, respectively. Thus, the most recently discovered ligand, 12-HHT, which does not bind to BLT1 receptors, shows by far the highest affinity of all of the tested ligands for BLT2 receptors. Among these 7 ligand, in contrast, BLT1 binds and is activated by only LTB_{4} and 20-hydroxy-LTB_{4}.

The two BLT4-like receptors in zebrafish, Blt2a and Blt2b, when transfected into Chinese hamster ovary cells, mediate rises in cytosolic calcium responses to both 12-HHT and LTB_{4} with 12-HHT being about 500- to 1000-fold stronger that LTB_{4} in doing so; 12-HHT is inactive in this assay in Chinese hamster ovary cells made to express the zebrafish LTB_{4} receptor-1 (Blt1). Thus, BLT1 receptor exhibits exquisite specificity, binding 5(S),12(R)-dihydroxy-6Z,8E,10E,14Z-eicosatetraenoic acid (i.e. LTB_{4}) but not LTB_{4}'s 12(S) or 6Z isomers whereas the BLT2 receptor exhibits a binding pattern that includes S and R stereoisomers, arachidonic acid metabolites composed of 17 and 20 carbons, and metabolites with a hydroxyl residue at the 5, 12, or 15 position. BLT2's binding pattern can only be considered as promiscuous. This promiscuous binding pattern complicates determination of which arachidonic acid metabolite and which metabolite-forming oxygenase (i.e. cyclooxygenase or lipoxygenase) is responsible for any given BLT2-dependent response. These determinations are often critical to defining the full mechanisms involved in, as well as the means for inhibiting or promoting, the functions of BLT2.

Based on the rather large structural differences in the known BLT2 receptor ligands, there may be other as yet undefined ligands that bind to and activate this receptor. For example, the formyl peptide receptor 2 (FPL2 receptor) was initially suggested to be a second receptor with ~70% amino acid identity to formyl peptide receptor 1 (FPL1 receptor). Both receptor types bind and are activated by a series of formylated oligopeptide chemotactic factors but FLP2 receptor appears to be a promiscuous receptor in that it also binds to and is activated by lipoxins and resolvins as well as various polypeptides and proteins. The FLP2 receptor appears to be engaged primarily in dampening and resolving inflammation responses, actions which appear to be diametrically opposite to the pro-inflammatory actions of FLP1 receptors.

== Btr2 knockout mice ==
The expression of Blt2 receptors in mice appears limited to fewer tissues than the BLT2 receptor in humans; Blt1 is robustly expressed only in mouse small intestine and skin. LTB4R2 knockout mouse studies, therefore, may reveal a more limited role for the BLT2 receptor than that in humans.

BLT2 receptor knockout mice exhibit attenuated ovalbumen-induced allergic airway eosinophilia and interleukin 13 (IL-13) content in their bronchoalveolar lavage fluid compared with wild type mice and CD4-positive T cells isolated from the knockout mice showed a reduction IL-13 production but there was no change in the bronchospasm response to ovalbumin in these mice. The BLT2 receptor ligand(s) and metabolic pathway(s) producing this ligand(s) were not identified. These results indicate that the Blt2 receptor functions to promote the eosinophilic-base inflammation which accompanies and may contribute to allergic lung disease; this effect may be do in part to its ability to reduce production of the pro-allergic cytokine, IL-13; the receptor does not appear to be responsible for allergen-induced bronchospasm. BLT2 receptor could play a similar role in human allergic diseases such as asthma.

In response to the oral administration of the inflammation-inducer dextran sodium sulfate, Blt2 receptor knockout mice, compared to wild type or Blt1 receptor knockout mice, exhibited: a) more severe colitis inflammation and body weight loss; b) increased mRNA expression for the pro-inflammatory cytokines interferon-γ, IL1B, and Interleukin 6, two pro-inflammatory chemokines viz., chemokine ligand 9 (also termed chemokine ligand 10) and chemokine 19 (CCL19), and metalloproteinases-3, -10, and -13 in inflamed colon tissues; c) enhanced accumulation of interferon-producing macrophages in affected colon tissues; d) increased phosphorylation of signal transducer and activator of transcription 3 (i.e. STAT3) in the crypts of affected colon tissue; and e) reduced colon mucosa integrity and barrier function as deduced from the effects of in vitro studies on the impact of BLT2 receptor expression on leakage of FITC-dextran in Madin-Darby canine kidney II cells. These results suggest that Blt2 receptors normally function to suppress colon inflammation in mice; based on its mass content in affected colon tissues, 12-HHT appears at least partly responsible for maintaining this function by stimulating Blt2 receptors. A similar role for the 12-HHT-BLT2 axis could occur in humans and be relevant to diseases such as ulcerative colitis and Crohn's disease.

LTB4R1 gene knockout provides complete protection from the joint inflammation occurring in a mouse model of rheumatoid arthritis (collagen-induced arthritis); double knockout of LTB4R1 and LTB4R2 genes did not alter the complete protection afforded by LTB4R1 knockout. Further evidence for the role of BLT2 in arthritis was seen in a model of serum transfer arthritis where loss of BLT2 led to weakened inflammation and damage to joints.

Thus, the knockout studies available to date assign BLT2 receptors a protective role in dampening certain allergic and inflammatory responses; this role contrasts with the assignment of BLT1 receptors as contributing to both these types of responses. More study is needed to determine if BLT2 receptors protect against other allergic and inflammatory responses and if they function similarly in humans.

== Bltr2 transgenic mice ==
The overexpression of BLT2 receptors in Bltr2 transgenic mice enhances the ability of subcutaneously injected LTB_{4} and 12-HETE to stimulate new blood vessel formation in skin. Studies indicate that the actions of both ligands were mediated by Blt2 receptors and, that Vascular endothelial growth factor (VEGF) stimulated BLT2 expression and 12-HETE production in Human umbilical vein endothelial cells (HUVEC), and that BLT2 receptor or 12-lipoxygenase knockdown inhibited VEGF-induced angiogenesis in in-vitro assays. These results suggest that BLT2 receptors play critical roles in the development of VEGF-induced neovascularization and are of particular interest to the roles of BLT2 receptors in the growth and spread of cancers and in inflammation (see below).

== Activities and clinical significance ==
=== Allergic airways disease ===
Mouse bone marrow mast cells and human eosinophils exhibit in vitro chemotaxis responses to 12-HHT. Since both cell types are implicated in allergic reactions, this suggests that BLT2 receptors could contribute to allergic responses in mice and humans. However, in a mouse model of ovalbumin-induced allergic airway disease: a) 12-HHT and its companion cyclooxygenase metabolites, Prostaglandin E2 and Prostaglandin D2, but not 12 other lipoxygenase or cyclooxygenase metabolites showed a statistically significantly increase in bronchoalveolar lavage fluid levels after intratracheal ovalbumin challenge; b) only 12-HHT, among the monitored BLT2 receptor-activating ligands (i.e. LTB_{4}, the 12(S) stereoisomer of 12-HETE, and 15(S)-HETE) rose to a level capable of activating BLT2 receptors; and c) BLT2 knockout mice exhibited a greatly enhanced response to ovalbumin challenge. This study also found that the expression of BLT2 receptors was significantly reduced in CD4+ T cells (which are known to mediate allergy-reactions) taken from asthmatic compared to non-asthmatic human controls. Thus, BLT2 receptors suppress allergic airways disease in mice and may function similarly in humans. These studies also allow that BLT2 receptors play suppressive functions in other allergic diseases.

=== Inflammation ===
The high affinity BLT2 receptor agonist, 12-HHT, stimulates in vitro chemotactic responses in human neutrophils, suggesting that this receptor, similar to BLT1 receptors, contributes to inflammation by recruiting circulating blood neutrophils to disturbed tissue sites. Other studies, however, indicate that the role of BLT2 receptors in inflammation is directed toward other cell types than neutrophils and differs very much from that of BLT1 receptors. Immortalized human skin keratinocyte HaCaT cells respond to ultraviolet B (UVB) radiation by generating toxic reactive oxygen species which in turn trigger the cells to become apoptotic and eventually die. This response is BLT2 receptor-dependent since a) topical treatment of mouse skin with a BLT2 receptor antagonist, LY255283, protects against UVB radiation-induced apoptosis; b) BLT2-overexpressing transgenic mice exhibit more extensive skin apoptosis in response to UVB irradiation that wild type mice; and c) 12-HHT inhibits HaCaT cells from synthesizing the pro-inflammation mediator, interleukin-6 (IL-6), in response to UVB radiation. Furthermore, BLT2 receptor knock-out mice mount of more severe intestinal inflammation response to dextran sodium sulfate than either wild type or BLT1 receptor knockout mice (see Knockout studies). Thus, BLT2 receptors appear responsible for suppressing UVB-induced skin inflammation and, in contrast to BLT1 receptors, oppose the development and thereby dampen the severity of experimental colitis in mice.

=== Cancer ===
The Ras subfamily of small GTPases function as Signal transduction proteins by transmitting the presence of extracellular stimuli into inducing the expression of genes which regulate cellular survival, proliferation, differentiation, adherence to extracellular matrix, and motility as well as factors that are released to promote new blood vessel formation (i.e. Neovascularization) and to alter the extracellular matrix; the three members of this subfamily, KRAS, NRAS (i.e. Neuroblastoma RAS viral oncogene homolog), and HRAS, develop point mutations to become oncogenes that drive the growth and spread of some 20% of all human cancers. The highest levels of Ras mutations are found in adenocarcinoma of the pancreas (90%), colon (50%), and lung (30%) Bos, 1989).

Ras oncogenes can stimulate arachidonic acid metabolism: a) HRAS, in a rat intestinal epithelial cell line, and KRAS, in a rat lung epithelial cell line, up-regulate COX2 expression and prostaglandin synthesis; b) HRAS induces 12-lipoxygenase in the human epidermoid carcinoma A431 cells; and c) HRAS stimulates the expression of 5-lipoxygenase, 5-lipoxygenase-activating protein, LTB_{4}, and BLT2 receptors Rat2 and a rat fibroblast cell lines thereby increasing the tumor-forming ability the latter cell line in athymic mice. These studies suggest that the metabolites of cyclooxygenase, 5-lipoxygenase, and 12-lipoxygenase, i.e. 12-HHT, LTB_{4}, and 12-HTE, respectively, may act through BLT2 receptors to contribute to the growth and spread of cancers initiated and/or oncogenic Ras and possibly other oncogenes. This is supported by findings that BLT2 is abnormally expressed in many human cancers that concurrently overexpress these arachidonic acid metabolizing pathways viz., follicular thyroid adenoma, renal cell carcinoma, urinary bladder transitional cell carcinoma, esophagus squamous cell carcinoma, colon adenocarcinoma, the serous cystadenocarcinoma type of ovarian cancer, and uterine cervical carcinoma. Other studies have implicated BLT2 in these and other types of cancer as follows.

==== Prostate cancer ====
12-HHT stimulates the PC3 human prostate cancer cell line to activate several pro-growth and/or pro-survival signaling pathways including protein kinase B, phosphoinositide 3-kinase, protein kinase C, proto-oncogene tyrosine-protein kinase Src, and (by inducing the proteolytic cleavage and release of a ligand for the epidermal growth factor receptor [EGFR] receptor from HB-EGF), EGFR. When detached from surfaces, cultured non-malignant PWR-1E and PC3 prostate cancer cells die by engaging suicidal apoptosis pathways, a reaction termed anoikis. This is accompanied by increased expression of BLT2 receptors, activation of NADPH oxidase (NOX), increases in NOX-mediated production of reactive oxygen species (ROS), and ROS-induced activation of the pro-survival transcription factor, NF-κB. Ectopic expression and stimulation of BLT2 receptors by 12(S)-HETE or a synthetic BLT2 receptor agonist, CAY-10583, inhibits whereas Gene knockdown by mRNA interference or pharmacological inhibition by LY255283 enhances these cells' anoikis response to surface detachment. Unlike PC-3 cells, LNCaP and CWR22rv-1 human prostate cancer cell lines require exogenous androgen for their survival; this mimics the androgen dependency exhibited by most human prostate cancers in their early, untreated stages. Both cell lines overexpress BLT2 receptors compared to the PWR-1E non-malignant human prostate cell line. Treatment with the BLT2 receptor antagonist, Ly255283, caused both cell lines to become apoptotic; furthermore, BLT2 receptor knockdown using interference mRNA caused LNCaP but not PWR-1E cell apoptosis. The effect appears due to the loss of BLT2-induced NOX4 generation, consequential reactive oxygen species-induced NF-κB-activation, and NF-κB-stimulated expression of androgen receptors. 12-HETE also increases the survival of PC-3 cells by helping to maintain high levels of phosphorylated Rb retinoblastoma protein, an effect which reduces the ability of retinoblastoma protein to inhibit the synthesis of DNA and thereby cell division. Finally, 12-lipoxygenase is overexpressed and the mass of 12-HETE is far higher in human prostate cancer than nearby normal prostate tissue; These findings suggest that BLT2 receptors operate to promote the survival, growth, and spread of human prostate cancer It remains unclear which if any of its 12-HHT, LTB_{4}, and/or 12-HETE ligands mediate BLT2 receptor activation in the human disease.

==== Urinary bladder cancer ====
LTB_{4} and 12(S)-HETE stimulate the invasiveness in an in vitro Matrigel invasion assay of highly malignant human 253 J-BV urinary bladder cancer cell; their activity in this assay is completely inhibited by a pharmacological inhibition or siRNA knockdown of BLT2 receptors. The expression of 5-lipoxygenase, 5-lipoxygenase-activating protein, 12-lipoxygenase (enzymes synthesizing LTB_{4} and 12(S)-HETE, respectively) as wells as LTB_{4} and 12(S)-HETE were substantially elevated in these cells. Pretreatment of these cells with an inhibitor of BLT2 receptors, reduced their tumor forming ability after injection into mice; intraperitoneal injections of LY255283 into the mice also decreased the metastasis-forming ability of the cells after injection in the urinary bladder. Finally, BLT2 receptor protein was over expressed by the malignant tissues of human urinary bladder cancer and this expression was positively associated with the severity of this cancer. The action of BLT2 receptors, similar to their actions on prostate cancer cells, appeared to involve the receptors activation of the NOX, reactive species of oxygen, NK-κB pathway. These results suggest that BLT2 receptors contribute to the aggressiveness and progression of human urinary bladder cancer.

==== Breast cancer ====
Compared to non-malignant IMR-90 and immortalized but non-malignant MCF-10A human breast cancer cell lines, MCF-7, ZR-75-1, T47-D, MDA-MB-231, MDA-MB-468, MDA-MB-453, and SK-BR-3 human breast cancer cell lines (see list of breast cancer cell lines) overexpress BLT2 mRNA and protein but show relatively little expression of BLT1 mRNA; treatment of the malignant but not non-malignant cells with a BLT2 antagonist, LY255283, but not a BLT1 antagonist, U75302, blocked proliferation of the cells in culture. LY255283 concurrently caused apoptosis in estrogen receptor negative MDA-MB-468 and MDA-MB-453 but not estrogen receptor positive MCF-7 and T47-D malignant cells. Since LY255283 also inhibits the BLT1 receptor, the apoptosis-inhibiting action of BLT2 receptors was also demonstrated by showing that siRNA-induced transient gene knockdown of BLT2 receptors caused apoptosis in the MDA-MB-468 cell line. BLT2 receptors link to the activation of the NADPH oxidase, NOX1 (a synthesizer of the superoxide anion which is a reactive oxygen species that, when inappropriately overproduced, causes cell death and tissue injury); the attendant increased production of reactive oxygen species and activation of NF-κB appeared responsible for these BLT-2 receptor dependent effects. Lipopolysaccharide (i.e. endotoxin) stimulates MDA-MB-231 and MDA-MB-435 cells to increase their invasiveness as determined with in vitro Matrigel Invasion Chamber assays; this effect appears due to its ability to induce the overexpression of BLT2 receptors, the enzymes which produce LTB_{4} and 12(S)-HETEs, and the key metabolites of these enzymes, LTB_{4} and 12(S)-HETE; furthermore, the latter the binding of the latter metabolites to cells overexpressed BLT2 receptors leads to the activation of NF-κB. These results indicate that the 12-HETE/BLT2 interaction reduces the survival of cultured human breast cells by stimulating the production of reactive oxygen species and the activation of NF-κB.

Epithelial–mesenchymal transition, a process whereby epithelial cells assume a mesenchymal phenotype, is proposed to occur in a subset of cells in various cancer tissues to promote their movement from a tumor site into blood and lymphatic vessels and thereby form distant metastases. Human breast cancer often expresses and appears promoted by Ras proteins (see carcinogenesis and the Ras subfamily). The forced expression of oncogenic Ras in cultured human MCF-10A breast cancer cells markedly up-regulates BLT2 receptors and this up-regulation appears essential for the epithelial–mesenchymal transition-promoting ability of transforming growth factor beta in these cells; BLT2 receptors in these cells appear to stimulate the production of reactive oxygen species and activation of NF-κB and may thereby contribute to the metastatic ability of breast cancer.

Since BLT2 receptors are significantly elevated in human breast cancer tissue compared to non-cancerous breast tissue, the cited studies, when taken together, indicate that BLT2 receptors promote the malignant growth, invasiveness, metastasis and possibly anti-cancer drug resistance of not only cultured human breast cancer cells but also of human breast cancer.

==== Ovarian cancer ====
Compared to CAOV-3 human ovarian cancer cells, SKOV-3 and CAOV-3 human ovarian cancer cells over express BLT4 receptors, LTB_{4} and 12-HETE metabolizing enzymes, two key metabolites of these enzymes, LTB_{4} and 12-HETE, and activated STAT3 also are far more invasive in animal models. Inhibition of BLT2 receptors by LY255283 but not of BLT1 receptors by U75302 and suppression of BLT2 receptors by siRNA treatment reduced the expression of NOX4 (i.e. NADPH oxidase 4, the reactive oxygen species made by this enzyme, activated STAT3, the invasion-promoting enzyme, MMP 2, and the in vitro invasiveness (Matrigel invasion assay) of SKOV-3 and CAOV-3 cells. LY255283 also inhibited the peritoneum metastasis of intra-peritoneal injected SKOV-3 cells in athymic mice. These studies indicate that the stimulation of BLT4 receptors by LTB_{4} and/or 12-HETE operate through a NOX4-reactive oxygen species-STAT-3-MMP2 pathway to promote the metastasis of SKOV-3 and CAOV-3 cancer cells in mice and may act similarly to promote metastases in human ovarian cancer.

==== Pancreatic cancer ====
BLT2 receptor protein and mRNA was found to be markedly elevated in human advanced pancreatic intraepithelial neoplasias in their primary pancreas sites as well as in lymph node metastasis sites; mRNA for BLT1 was also elevated in these tissues but to a ~5-fold greater extent. Both receptors' mRNA were also expressed in a wide range of human pancreas cancer cell lines with BLT1 receptor mRNA ~2-fold greater than that for BLT2. The stable over expression of BLT2 in AsPC-1, Colo357, and PANC-1 human pancreas cancer cell lines increased these cells' in vitro growth rates; specific BLT2 agonists also stimulated Colo367 and Panc-1 cell growth. BLT2 receptors mediated the in vitro migration of Panc-1 cells. These results allow that BLT2 receptors may contribute to the malignant growth and metastasis of human pancreas cancer.

==== Colon cancer ====
The proliferation of Caco-2 human epithelial colorectal adenocarcinoma cells in culture was stimulated by 12-HETE and inhibited by a somewhat selective inhibitor of 12-lipoxygenase, baicalein; the stimulatory effect of 12-HETE appeared due to its interaction with BLT2 receptors based on the effects of pharmacological inhibitors.

==== Esophageal cancer ====
Esophagus squamous cell carcinoma overexpresses BLT2 receptors.

=== Other activities ===
The BLT2 receptor mediates the itch scratching behavior induced by intradermal injection of 12-HETE in mice.

== Antagonist ==
LY255283 has been presented as a "selective" BLT2 receptor antagonist. However, this compound is also a BLT1 receptor agonists and therefore cannot be used to discriminate between these two receptor types. In all of the studies using LY255283 quoted above, other methods, such as siRNA knockdown, were used in conjunction with LY255283 to identify BLT2-dependency. Currently, there are no reports on selective BLT2 receptor antagonists.

== See also ==
- Eicosanoid receptor
- 12-Hydroxyheptadecatrienoic acid
- 12-Hydroxyeicosatetraenoic acid
- 15-Hydroxyicosatetraenoic acid
