= CYP2S1 =

Protein-coding gene in the species Homo sapiens

Identifiers
- Aliases: CYP2S1, CYPIIS1, cytochrome P450 family 2 subfamily S member 1
- External IDs: OMIM: 611529; MGI: 1921384; GeneCards: CYP2S1
Enzyme activity
EC #	BRENDA	ExPASy	KEGG	MetaCyc
4.2.1.152	↗	↗	↗	↗
5.3.99.5	↗	↗	↗	↗

Gene location (Human)
Chr.	Chromosome 19 (human)
Band	19q13.2	Start	41,193,210 bp
Band	19q13.2	End	41,207,539 bp

Gene location (Mouse)
Chr.	Chromosome 7 (mouse)
Band	7|7 A3	Start	25,501,900 bp
Band	7|7 A3	End	25,516,338 bp
RNA expression pattern
Bgee	Human / Mouse (ortholog); Top expressed in: mucosa of ileum; jejunal mucosa; duodenum; nasal epithelium; gonad; olfactory zone of nasal mucosa; mucosa of transverse colon; rectum; body of stomach; tibialis anterior muscle / Top expressed in: epithelium of stomach; pyloric antrum; mucous cell of stomach; esophagus; right lung lobe; submandibular gland; colon; left colon; parotid gland; duodenum; More reference expression data
BioGPS	n/a
Gene ontology
Molecular function	iron ion binding; oxidoreductase activity; aromatase activity; protein binding; heme binding; oxidoreductase activity, acting on paired donors, with incorporation or reduction of molecular oxygen, reduced flavin or flavoprotein as one donor, and incorporation of one atom of oxygen; oxidoreductase activity, acting on paired donors, with incorporation or reduction of molecular oxygen; metal ion binding; monooxygenase activity; retinoic acid 4-hydroxylase activity; arachidonic acid epoxygenase activity; steroid hydroxylase activity
Cellular component	organelle membrane; endoplasmic reticulum membrane; endoplasmic reticulum; membrane; intracellular membrane-bounded organelle; cytoplasm
Biological process	epoxygenase P450 pathway; organic acid metabolic process; xenobiotic metabolic process
Sources:Amigo / QuickGO
Orthologs
Databases	NCBI: entry; OMA: entry
Species	Human	Mouse
Entrez	29785	74134
Ensembl	ENSG00000167600	ENSMUSG00000040703
UniProt	Q96SQ9	Q9DBX6
RefSeq (mRNA)	NM_030622	NM_028775
RefSeq (protein)	NP_085125	NP_083051
Location (UCSC)	Chr 19: 41.19 – 41.21 Mb	Chr 7: 25.5 – 25.52 Mb
PubMed search
- Wikidata
View/Edit Human	View/Edit Mouse

Cytochrome P450 2S1 is a protein that in humans is encoded by the CYP2S1 gene. The gene is located in chromosome 19q13.2 within a cluster including other CYP2 family members such as CYP2A6, CYP2A13, CYP2B6, and CYP2F1.

== Expression ==
CYP2S1 is highly expressed in epithelial tissues of the respiratory, gastrointestinal, urinary tracts, and skin and in leukocytes of the monocyte/macrophage and lymphocyte series; it is also expressed throughout Embryogenesis and, as discussed below, certain types of cancers.

== Function ==
This gene encodes a member of the cytochrome P450 superfamily of enzymes. The cytochrome P450 proteins are monooxygenases which catalyze many reactions involved in drug metabolism and synthesis of cholesterol, steroids and other lipids. This protein localizes to the endoplasmic reticulum. In rodents, the homologous protein has been shown to metabolize certain carcinogens although its specific function(s) in humans has not been clearly determined. In in vitro studies, the human enzyme has been found to metabolize all-trans-retinoic acid to 4-hydroxy-retinoic acid and 5, 6-epoxy-retinoic acid and therefore may play a role in processing retinoic acid in tissues where it is highly expressed such as the skin. CYP2S1 is significantly overexpressed and, perhaps directly related to this, its gene is significantly hypomethylated (see gene methylation in the skin of Han Chinese patients with psoriasis suggesting that it plays a role in the development of this disease.

CYP2S1 has been suggested to be involved in the growth and/or spread of certain tumors of epithelial cell origin: its higher expression in breast or colorectal cancer tissues appears associated respectively with shorter survival times or poor prognoses, and it is more highly expressed in metastasis compared to primary tumor tissues of ovarian cancer.

CYP2S1 has recently been assigned epoxygenase activity. It metabolizes 1) arachidonic acid to its various epoxides, i.e., the epoxyeicosatrienoic acids (also termed EETs); 2) docosahexaenoic acid to its various epoxides, i.e. the epoxydocosapentaenoic acids (also termed EDPs); and 3) linoleic acid to its various epoxides, i.e. vernolic acid (also termed leukotoxin) and coronaric acid (also termed isoleukotoxin). It seems likely, although not yet tested, that CYP231 will also prove able to metabolize other polyunsaturated fatty acids to their epoxides; for example, the enzyme may metabolize eicosapentaenoic acid to epoxyeicosatetraenoic acids (also termed EEQs). Animal model studies implicate the EET, EDP, and EEQ epoxides in regulating blood pressure, tissue blood flow, new blood vessel formation (i.e. angiogenesis, pain perception, and the growth of various cancers; limited studies suggest but have not proven that these epoxides may function similarly in humans (see epoxyeicosatrienoic acid, epoxydocosapentaenoic acid, eicosatetraenoic acid, and epoxygenase pages). The CYP2S1-dependent production of EETs, which stimulate the growth of various types of cancer cells, including those of the colon (see epoxyeicosatrienoic acid#cancer), could contribute to the unfavorable effects of this CYP in the sited cancers.

Vernolic and coronaric acids are potentially toxic, causing multiple organ failure and acute respiratory distress when injected into animals and suggested to be involved in causing these syndromes in humans.

CYP2S1 has also been found to metabolize Prostaglandin G2 and Prostaglandin H2 to the biologically active product, 12-Hydroxyheptadecatrienoic acid (i.e. 12(S)-hydroxyheptadeca-5Z,8E,10E-trienoic acid, also termed 12-HHT).
