= Daniel Simmons =

Daniel Simmons may refer to:

- Dan Simmons (1948–2026), novelist
- Chief Yowlachie (1890–1966), Yakima Indian actor born Daniel Simmons
- Daniel ‘Danny’ Simmons Jr (born 1953-2026), poet and illustrator
- Daniel 'Diggy' Simmons III, hip-hop singer (b. 1995)
- Daniel A. Simmons, author of self-psychology texts
- Daniel L. Simmons, chemist at Brigham Young University
- Daniel Simmons, murder victim in the Charleston church shooting
