= Cyclooxygenase-1 =

Enzyme involved in prostaglandin synthesis

PTGS1
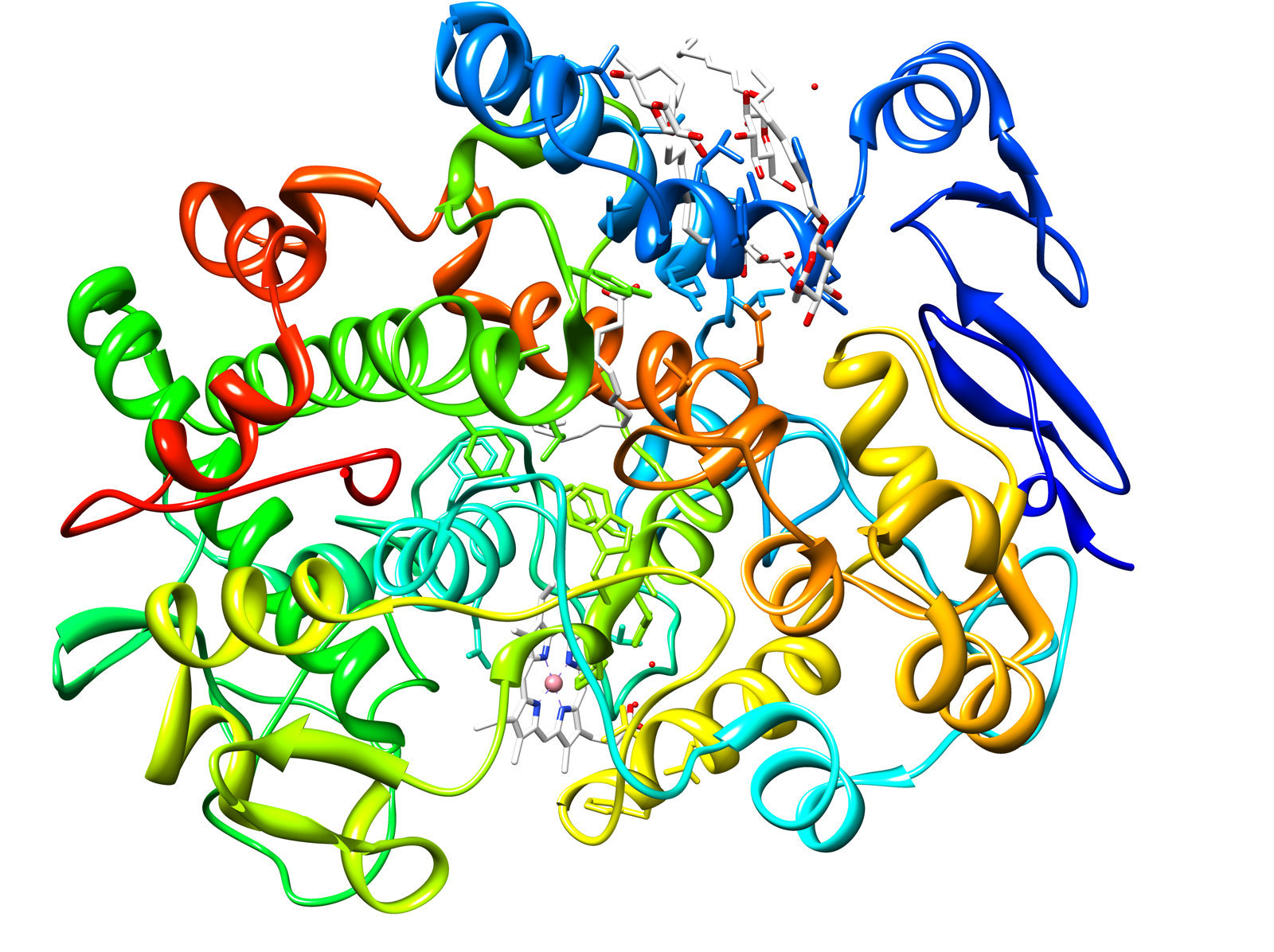

Identifiers
- Aliases: PTGS1, COX1, COX3, PCOX1, PES-1, PGG/HS, PGHS-1, PGHS1, PHS1, PTGHS, prostaglandin-endoperoxide synthase 1
- External IDs: OMIM: 176805; MGI: 97797; GeneCards: PTGS1
Enzyme activity
EC #	BRENDA	ExPASy	KEGG	MetaCyc
1.14.99.1	↗	↗	↗	↗

Gene location (Human)
Chr.	Chromosome 9 (human)
Band	9q33.2	Start	122,370,530 bp
Band	9q33.2	End	122,395,703 bp

Gene location (Mouse)
Chr.	Chromosome 2 (mouse)
Band	2 B|2 24.19 cM	Start	36,120,438 bp
Band	2 B|2 24.19 cM	End	36,142,284 bp
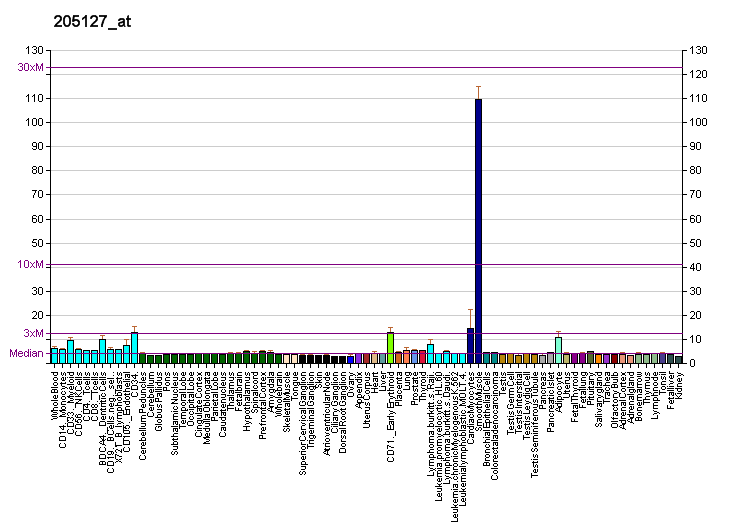

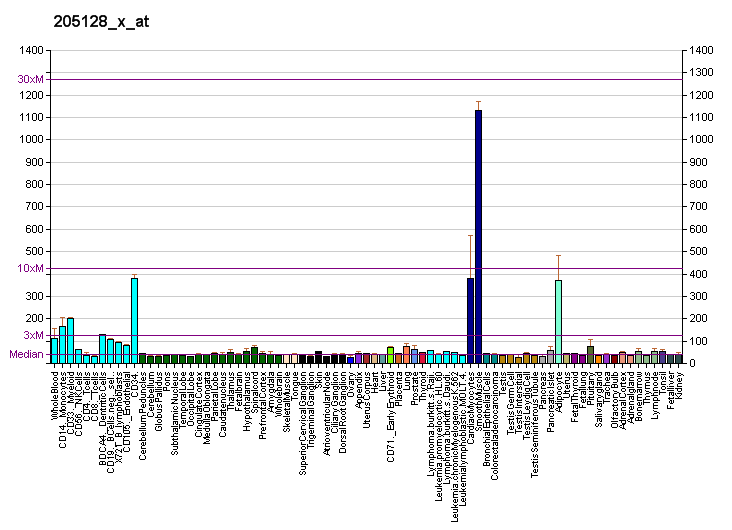

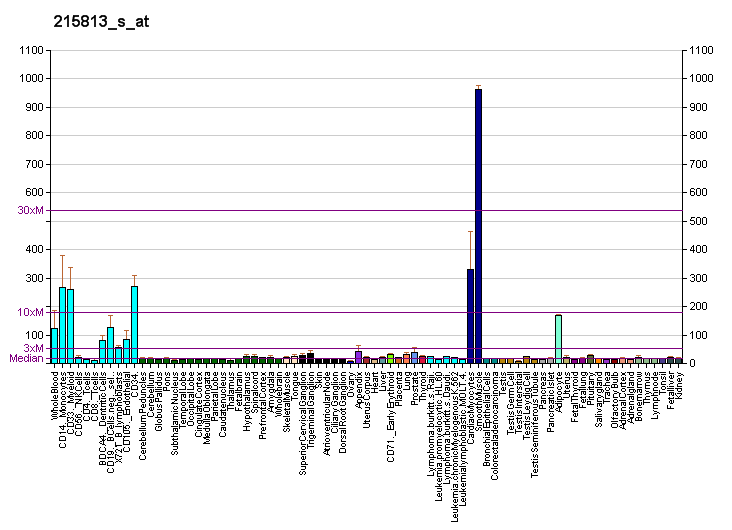
RNA expression pattern
Bgee	Human / Mouse (ortholog); Top expressed in: stromal cell of endometrium; germinal epithelium; monocyte; skin of arm; skin of thigh; muscle layer of sigmoid colon; parietal pleura; tendon of biceps brachii; skin of abdomen; urinary bladder / Top expressed in: medullary collecting duct; skin of external ear; granulocyte; left lung lobe; right lung lobe; tibiofemoral joint; transitional epithelium of urinary bladder; right lobe of liver; conjunctival fornix; lip; More reference expression data
BioGPS	More reference expression data
Gene ontology
Molecular function	oxidoreductase activity; prostaglandin-endoperoxide synthase activity; dioxygenase activity; heme binding; metal ion binding; peroxidase activity
Cellular component	nucleus; intracellular membrane-bounded organelle; photoreceptor outer segment; organelle membrane; extracellular exosome; membrane; endoplasmic reticulum; cytoplasm; Golgi apparatus; endoplasmic reticulum membrane
Biological process	prostaglandin biosynthetic process; fatty acid biosynthetic process; response to oxidative stress; regulation of cell population proliferation; prostaglandin metabolic process; regulation of blood pressure; cyclooxygenase pathway; lipid metabolism; inflammatory response; xenobiotic metabolic process; fatty acid metabolic process; cellular oxidant detoxification
Sources:Amigo / QuickGO
Orthologs
Databases	NCBI: entry; OMA: entry
Species	Human	Mouse
Entrez	5742	19224
Ensembl	ENSG00000095303	ENSMUSG00000047250
UniProt	P23219	P22437
RefSeq (mRNA)	NM_000962; NM_001271164; NM_001271165; NM_001271166; NM_001271367 NM_001271368; NM_080591	NM_008969
RefSeq (protein)	NP_000953; NP_001258093; NP_001258094; NP_001258095; NP_001258296 NP_001258297; NP_542158	NP_032995
Location (UCSC)	Chr 9: 122.37 – 122.4 Mb	Chr 2: 36.12 – 36.14 Mb
PubMed search
- Wikidata
View/Edit Human	View/Edit Mouse

Cyclooxygenase 1 (COX-1), also known as prostaglandin-endoperoxide synthase 1 (HUGO PTGS1), is an enzyme that in humans is encoded by the PTGS1 gene. In humans it is one of three cyclooxygenases. Clinically, COX-1 is notable as the target enzyme for aspirin.

== History ==
Cyclooxygenase (COX) is the central enzyme in the biosynthetic pathway to prostaglandins from arachidonic acid. This protein was isolated more than 40 years ago and cloned in 1988.

== Gene and isozymes ==
There are two isozymes of COX encoded by distinct gene products: a constitutive COX-1 (this enzyme) and an inducible COX-2, which differ in their regulation of expression and tissue distribution. The expression of these two transcripts is differentially regulated by relevant cytokines and growth factors. This gene encodes COX-1, which regulates angiogenesis in endothelial cells. COX-1 is also involved in cell signaling and maintaining tissue homeostasis. A splice variant of COX-1 termed COX-3 was identified in the central nervous system of dogs, but does not result in a functional protein in humans. Two smaller COX-1-derived proteins (the partial COX-1 proteins PCOX-1A and PCOX-1B) have also been discovered, but their precise roles are yet to be described.

== Function ==
Prostaglandin-endoperoxide synthase (PTGS), also known as cyclooxygenase (COX), is the key enzyme in prostaglandin biosynthesis. It converts free arachidonic acid, released from membrane phospholipids at the sn-2 ester binding site by the enzymatic activity of phospholipase A2, to prostaglandin (PG) H2. The reaction involves both cyclooxygenase (dioxygenase) and hydroperoxidase (peroxidase) activity. The cyclooxygenase activity incorporates two oxygen molecules into arachidonic acid or alternate polyunsaturated fatty acid substrates, such as linoleic acid and eicosapentaenoic acid. Metabolism of arachidonic acid forms a labile intermediate peroxide, PGG2, which is reduced to the corresponding alcohol, PGH2, by the enzyme's hydroperoxidase activity.

While metabolizing arachidonic acid primarily to PGG2, COX-1 also converts this fatty acid to small amounts of a racemic mixture of 15-Hydroxyicosatetraenoic acids (i.e., 15-HETEs) composed of ~22% 15(R)-HETE and ~78% 15(S)-HETE stereoisomers as well as a small amount of 11(R)-HETE. The two 15-HETE stereoisomers have intrinsic biological activities but, perhaps more importantly, can be further metabolized to a major class of anti-inflammatory agents, the lipoxins. In addition, PGG2 and PGH2 rearrange non-enzymatically to a mixture of 12-Hydroxyheptadecatrienoic acids viz.,1 2-(S)-hydroxy-5Z,8E,10E-heptadecatrienoic acid (i.e. 12-HHT) and 12-(S)-hydroxy-5Z,8Z,10E-heptadecatrienoic acid plus Malonyldialdehyde. and can be metabolized by CYP2S1 to 12-HHT (see 12-Hydroxyheptadecatrienoic acid). These alternate metabolites of COX-1 may contribute to its activities.

COX-1 promotes the production of the natural mucus lining that protects the inner stomach and contributes to reduced acid secretion and reduced pepsin content. COX-1 is normally present in a variety of areas of the body, including not only the stomach but any site of inflammation.

== Clinical significance ==
COX-1 is inhibited by nonsteroidal anti-inflammatory drugs (NSAIDs) such as aspirin. Thromboxane A2, the major product of COX-1 in platelets, induces platelet aggregation. The inhibition of COX-1 is sufficient to explain why low dose aspirin is effective at reducing cardiac events.

== See also ==
- Arachidonic acid
- Cyclooxygenase
- Cyclooxygenase 2
- NSAID
- Discovery and development of COX-2 selective inhibitors
- COX-2 selective inhibitor
