= NS-398 =

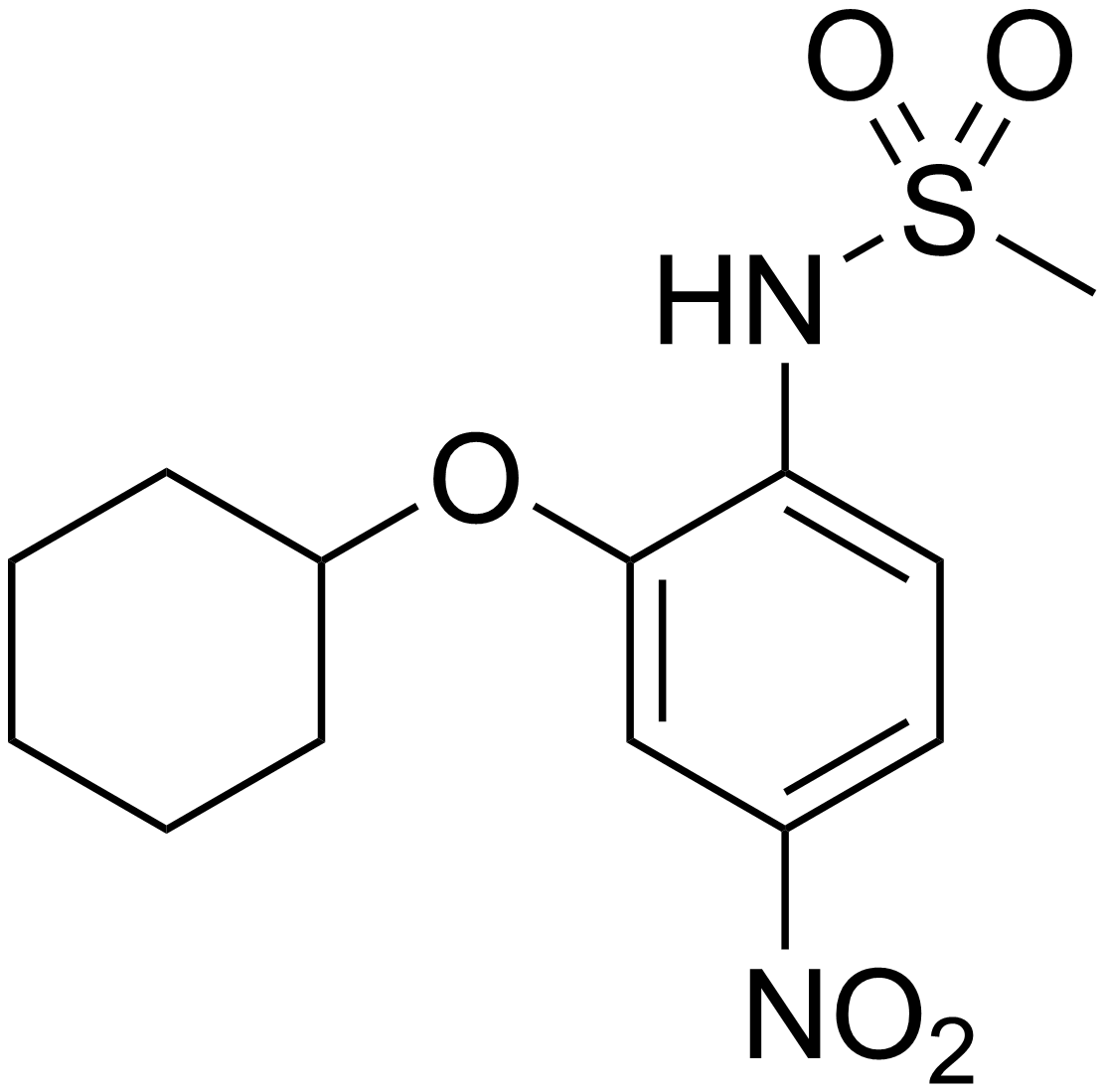

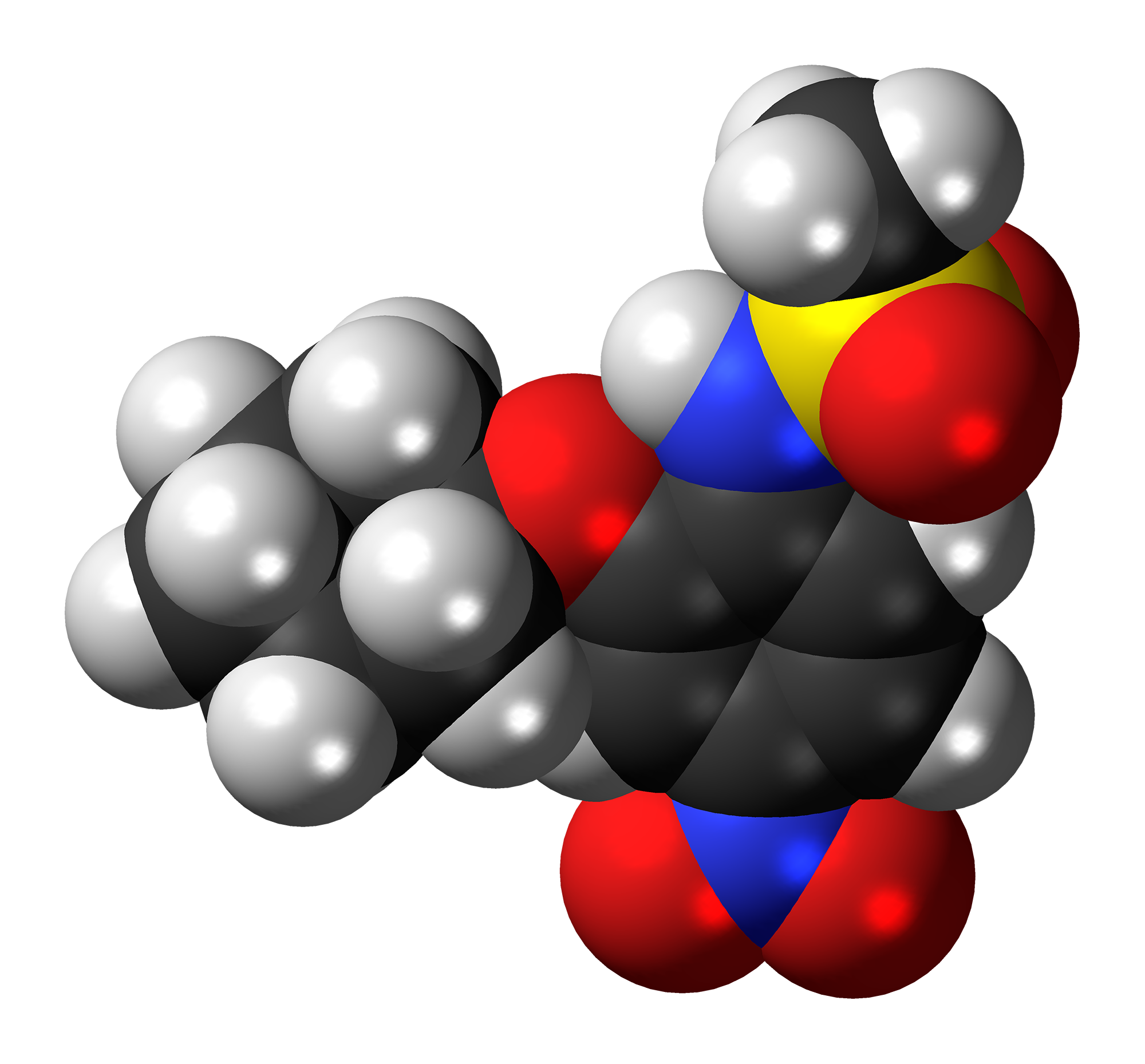

Names
- Preferred IUPAC name N-[2-(Cyclohexyloxy)-4-nitrophenyl]methanesulfonamide

Identifiers
CAS Number	123653-11-2
3D model (JSmol)	Interactive image
ChEBI	CHEBI:73458
ChEMBL	ChEMBL7162
ChemSpider	4393
DrugBank	DB14060
IUPHAR/BPS	8976
PubChem CID	4553
UNII	9SP55KM2KS
CompTox Dashboard (EPA)	DTXSID8041084
- InChI: InChI=1S/C13H18N2O5S/c1-21(18,19)14-12-8-7-10(15(16)17)9-13(12)20-11-5-3-2-4-6-11/h7-9,11,14H,2-6H2,1H3 Key: KTDZCOWXCWUPEO-UHFFFAOYSA-N; InChI=1/C13H18N2O5S/c1-21(18,19)14-12-8-7-10(15(16)17)9-13(12)20-11-5-3-2-4-6-11/h7-9,11,14H,2-6H2,1H3 Key: KTDZCOWXCWUPEO-UHFFFAOYAY
- SMILES: CS(=O)(=O)NC1=C(C=C(C=C1)[N+](=O)[O-])OC2CCCCC2

Properties
Chemical formula	C_{13}H_{18}N_{2}O_{5}S
Molar mass	314.36 g·mol^{−1}
Appearance	Off-white solid
Solubility in water	Insoluble
Solubility in DMSO	5 mg/mL

Hazards
- GHS labelling
Pictograms	(GHS07: Exclamation mark)
Signal word	Warning
Hazard statements	H302, H312, H332
Precautionary statements	P280
- Except where otherwise noted, data are given for materials in their standard state (at 25 °C [77 °F], 100 kPa). verify (what is ?) Infobox references

NS-398 is a COX-2 inhibitor used in the study of the function of cyclooxygenases.

== See also ==
- Celecoxib
- Tilmacoxib (JTE-522)
