= Cyclooxygenase-3 =

Enzyme involved in prostanoid synthesis

Cyclooxygenase-3 (COX-3) is an enzyme that is encoded by the PTGS1 (COX1) gene, but is not functional in humans. COX-3 is the third and most recently discovered cyclooxygenase (COX3050) isozyme, while the first two to be discovered were COX-1 and COX-2. The COX-3 isozyme is encoded by the same gene as COX-1, with the difference that COX-3 retains an intron that is not retained in COX-1.

The other two cyclooxygenase isozymes are known to convert dihomo-γ-linolenic acid and arachidonic acid into prostaglandins, and are the targets of nonsteroidal anti-inflammatory drugs (NSAIDs).

== Transcription ==
COX-3 is transcribed from the PTGS1 (COX1) gene, but the resulting mRNA is spliced differently. In dogs the resulting protein resembles the other two COX enzymes, but in mice and humans it does not, owing to a frame-shift mechanism. This mechanism is due to the fact that the spliced intron has 93 bases in dogs, resulting in the loss of 93:3 = 31 amino acids in the COX-3 sequence, which apparently does not impair its functionality. In humans, the intron is 94 bases long, leading to a protein with a completely different amino acid sequence from those of COX-1 or COX-2. The expressed protein does not show COX activity, and it is unlikely to play a role in prostaglandin-mediated physiological responses.

== Discovery ==
The original COX-1/COX-2 model did not fully explain the immune responses of fever and inflammation. Even though COX-2 inhibitors are as active as traditional NSAIDs in inflammatory models, there were still some unexplained issues. For example, the widespread use of the newer generation of COX-2-selective compounds demonstrated that COX-2 also has other physiological roles, e.g. in the maintenance of fluid balance by the kidneys. In addition, the COX-1/COX-2 model did not explain the properties of paracetamol (acetaminophen): although its antipyretic (fever reducing) and analgesic (pain relieving) effects might be explained by inhibition of COX-2, it is not anti-inflammatory. Daniel L. Simmons' group suggested this was because of the presence of a variant of COX-1, which they named COX-3, that would be especially sensitive to paracetamol and related compounds. If this enzyme were particularly expressed in the brain, it could explain both the characteristics of paracetamol, which has been reputed for some time of being a centrally-acting antipyretic.

COX-3 was actually discovered in 2002, and been found to be selectively inhibited by paracetamol, phenacetin, antipyrine, aminopyrine, dipyrone, and strongly inhibited by diclofenac, indomethacin, ibuprofen and aspirin in rodent studies. Acetaminophen is thought of as a mild analgesic and antipyretic suitable, at best, for mild to moderate pain. Its site of action has recently been identified as a COX-3 isoenzyme, a variant of the COX-1 enzyme. This discovery raises the possibility of developing more potent and selective drugs targeting the site.

A number of arguments counted against the COX-3 hypothesis: COX-2-selective inhibitors react weakly with the COX-3 enzymatic site, because the site is identical to that in COX-1, but they are as good at reducing fever as older NSAIDs. The fever response has also been clearly associated with a rapid induction of COX-2 expression and an associated increase in prostaglandin E2 production, with no role for COX-1 or a COX-1 gene product (e.g., COX-3). Finally, the sites of COX-3 expression do not appear to fit in well with those sites associated with fever, and the protein should be present within the hypothalamus rather than the cerebral cortex. All these considerations appeared to argue against COX-3 being the site of the antipyretic actions of NSAIDs and COX-2-selective agents. However, the results could be read as showing that paracetamol acts at a different site than the other NSAIDs and that more than one COX isoform contribute to the fever response.

Finally, the discovery of the frame-shift mechanism has made it highly unlikely that COX-3 plays a role in inflammation and fever in humans.
