= Tilmacoxib =

Chemical compound

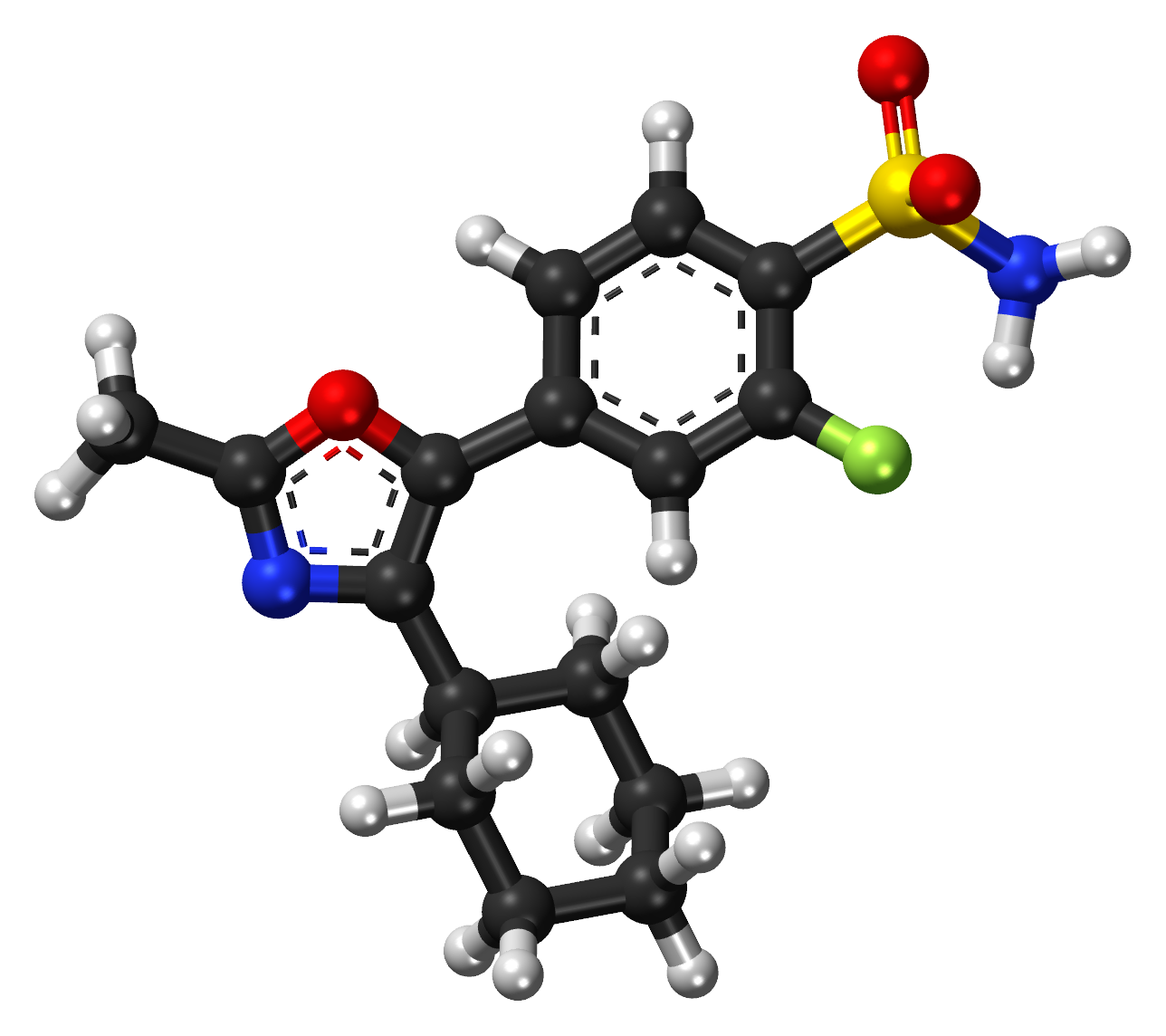

Pharmacokinetic data
- Bioavailability: solution (64–88%) compared with capsule (22–40%).

Identifiers
- IUPAC name: 4-(4-cyclohexyl-2-methyl-1,3-oxazol-5-yl)-2-fluorobenzenesulfonamide
- CAS Number: 180200-68-4
- PubChem CID: 159271
- ChemSpider: 140082
- UNII: G6VI5P84SX
- ChEBI: CHEBI:73041
- ChEMBL: ChEMBL34913
- CompTox Dashboard (EPA): DTXSID0057671

Chemical and physical data
- Formula: C_{16}H_{19}FN_{2}O_{3}S
- Molar mass: 338.40 g·mol^{−1}
- 3D model (JSmol): Interactive image
- SMILES: O=S(=O)(N)c3ccc(c1oc(nc1C2CCCCC2)C)cc3F
- InChI: InChI=1S/C16H19FN2O3S/c1-10-19-15(11-5-3-2-4-6-11)16(22-10)12-7-8-14(13(17)9-12)23(18,20)21/h7-9,11H,2-6H2,1H3,(H2,18,20,21); Key:MIMJSJSRRDZIPW-UHFFFAOYSA-N

Tilmacoxib or JTE-522 is a COX-2 inhibitor and is an effective chemopreventive agent against rat experimental liver fibrosis.

== See also ==
- NS-398
- Celecoxib
