= Relda Marie Cailleau =

American scientist

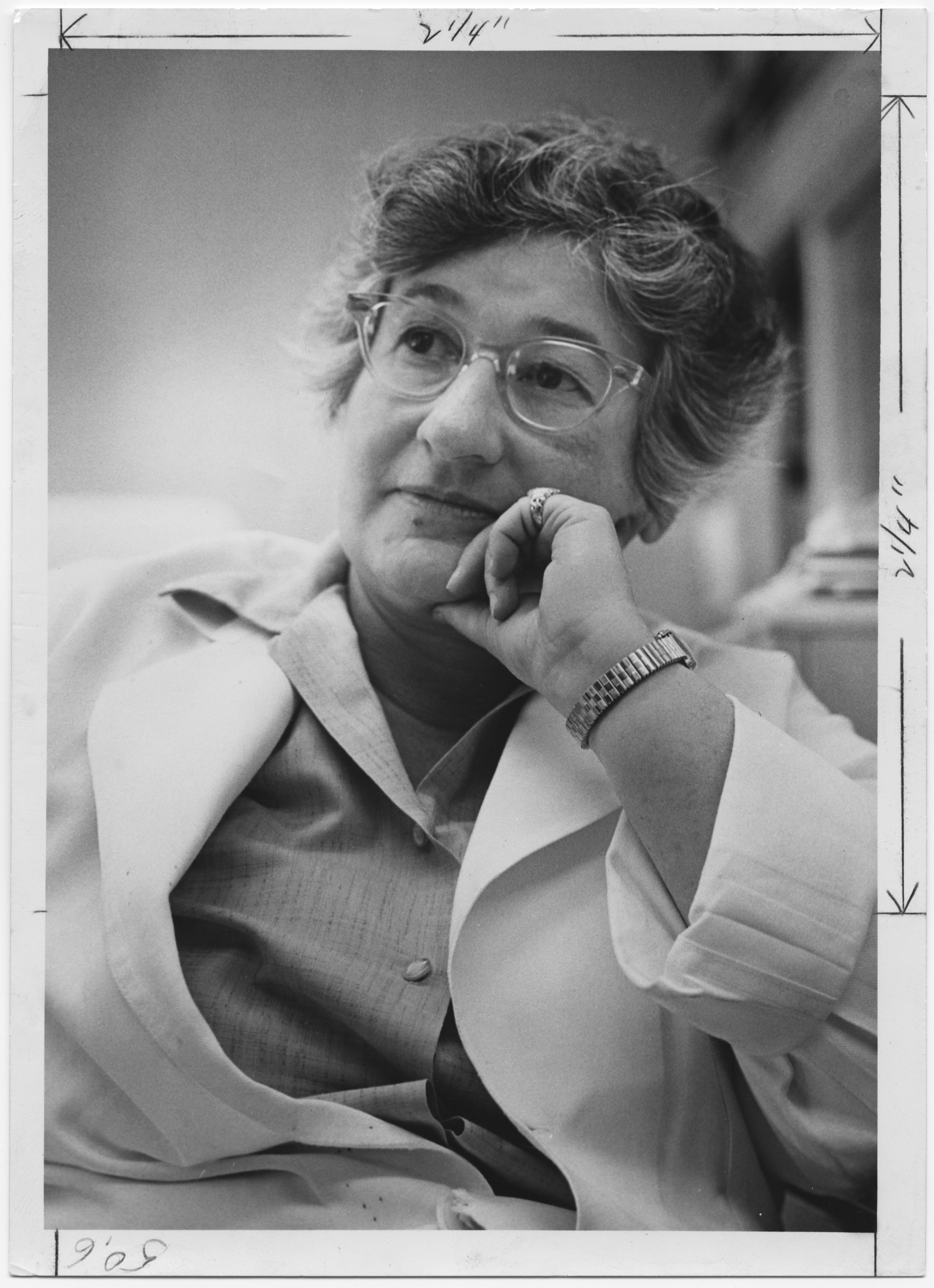
- Cailleau in her laboratory in Berkeley, California in 1965. Courtesy of the McGovern Historical Center, University of Texas Medical Library
- Born: February 1, 1909; San Francisco, California
- Died: February 28, 1995 (aged 86); Berkeley, California
- Education: University of California, Berkeley; University of Paris
- Known for: Discovery of breast cancer cell lines
- Parent(s): Armand Cailleau; Rose Relda Adler Cailleau
- Relatives: Armand Cailleau, Jr. (brother)

Relda Marie Cailleau (1 February 1909 - 28 February 1995) was an American scientist primarily known for her establishment of a series of breast cancer cell lines that have been crucial to the discovery of anticancer drugs and an understanding of breast cancer biology.

== Early life and education ==
Cailleau was born in San Francisco, California. Her father, Armand Cailleau (1856-1930) was born in France and immigrated from Paris in 1877. He settled in San Francisco and established a successful men's clothing store in 1877 at the corner of Geary and Grant Avenue. Her mother, Rose Relda Adler Cailleau (d.1936), was a well-known soprano opera singer who debuted at the Opéra Comique in Paris in 1899 and toured throughout Europe. After her marriage in London in 1903 to Cailleau, she performed in the San Francisco area and gave voice lessons. Relda Cailleau had one brother Armand Cailleau, Jr. As a child, Relda Cailleau was an original "Termite" from Lewis Terman's study of gifted children.

Cailleau graduated from Girls High School in San Francisco in 1926. She completed her bachelor's degree at the University of California, Berkeley in 1930, with a major in bacteriology. She later earned a master's degree in biochemistry at Berkeley working in the laboratory of Charles Atwood Kofoid who was known for his studies of marine protozoans and the effects of parasites on human health. Cailleau's work with Kofoid examined nutrition in normal rats.

Cailleau later pursued graduate work in France at the Institut Pasteur at the University of Paris, receiving her doctorate in 1937 under the tutelage of the Nobel Prize winner Andre Lwoff. Her thesis “La Nutrition des Flagellés tétramitidés: Les stérols, facteurs de croissance pour les Trichomonades (The Nutrition of Flagellates Tetramitidae: Sterols, Growth Factors for Trichomonads) was presented to the Faculty of Sciences of the University of Paris for a docteur ès sciences naturelles degree, equivalent to a Ph.D. in the natural sciences. Her work on the growth requirements of Trichomonadidae in artificial media led to major advancements in this field.

== Career and research ==
Cailleau returned to the United States in 1939 and began her research career at various institutions in California. In 1944, she was working at the Laboratory of Home Economics at UC Berkeley studying human nutrition. In 1946, she returned to Lwoff's group at the Pasteur Institute. She published several papers on bacterial metabolism with Lwoff.

Leaving France in 1949, Cailleau began work at UC Berkeley in the Dept. of Biochemistry. She joined the Cancer Research Institute at the University of California at San Francisco Medical Center in 1955. At this time, Cailleau joined a small group of pioneers studying methods to establish cell lines from human tissue. She was one of the first to establish a cell line (MAC-21) from a human mucinous adenocarcinoma. Despite extensive work on this line as a surrogate for human lung cancer cells, MAC-21 was later found to have been contaminated with HeLa Cells. This may have been due to the fact that experiments were simultaneously conducted on the viral infectivity of both MAC-21 and HeLa cells. The publication of this paper led to a bitter dispute between Cailleau and Walter Nelson-Rees. Nelson-Rees subsequently published a series of papers in major scientific journals pleading for more stringent methods to establish the true identity of cultured cell lines.

Cailleau retired from the San Francisco Cancer Institute in 1970 as an Associate Research Biochemist. She then relocated to the M. D. Anderson Cancer Center in Houston, with her collaborator William John Reeves Jr, who had worked under her tutelage as a post doctoral fellow at UCSF.

Importance of Breast Cancer Cell Lines

In 1970, Cailleau continued her collaboration with Reeves to establish a series of breast cancer cell lines that would be useful in cancer research. Several of these lines have proved to be crucial for development of anticancer drugs and for an understanding of the genesis of breast cancer. Some examples of the 20 lines that were isolated are as follows:

MDA-MB -468 The MDA-MB-468 cell line was established from a pleural effusion of a 51 year old black woman with metastatic breast adenocarcinoma. In collaboration with Ron Buick, Cailleau's group reported that MDA-MB-468 expressed a very high number of Epidermal Growth Factor receptors and was growth-inhibited by EGF at concentrations that stimulated growth of cells with lower numbers of receptors. The basis for the elevated receptor level was both EGF receptor gene amplification and gene over-expression. This group established a threshold model for EGF-induced growth inhibition in which the response to EGF was related to the number of EGF receptors. This line has proved crucial for the discovery of EGFR related therapies such as antibodies like Cetuximab and kinase inhibitors such as Gefitinib currently used in treatment of breast and lung cancer. This cell line was for many years a member of the NCI 60 drug panel that was used to choose disease specific anti-cancer drugs for further development.

MDA-MB -453 was derived in 1976 by Cailleau's group from a pleural effusion of a 48 year old Caucasian woman with metastatic carcinoma of the breast that involved lymph nodes, brain and both pleural and pericardial cavities. The cell line expresses Epidermal Growth Factor, Transforming growth factor alpha and Fibroblast growth factor. Gene expression profiling has revealed that this cell line may be a useful model for apocrine carcinoma of the breast. The MDA-MB-453 cell line is androgen receptor-positive and `triple-negative' for estrogen receptor-α, progesterone receptor and the Her-2/neu protein expression.

MDA-MB 231 The MDA-MB-231 cell line is an epithelial, human breast cancer cell line that was established from a pleural effusion of a 51-year-old Caucasian female with metastatic mammary adenocarcinoma. This cell line is commonly used as a model of highly aggressive, invasive triple-negative breast cancer that lacks expression of estrogen receptor (ER), progesterone receptor (PR) expression, and HER2 (human epidermal growth factor receptor 2) amplification.. The invasiveness of the MDA-MB-231 cells is mediated by proteolytic degradation of the extracellular matrix. MDA-MB-231 has served as a surrogate for development of drugs targeted to breast cancer as well as a model for breast cancer metastasis to bone. It is also a member of the NCI 60 drug panel.

MDA-MB 435 was also designated as of breast cancer origin from the initial study of Cailleau. Although it was used for many years as a breast cancer cell line and was a member of the NCI 60 panel, the line was first discovered to be derived from a melanoma in 2000. At that time, cDNA micro array analysis of the NCI-60 panel showed that the expression pattern of MDA-MB-435 closely resembled the patterns seen in melanoma cell lines.

Cailleau remained at MD Anderson for 17 years. In 1987, she retired and returned to Berkeley.

== Personal life ==
Cailleau died in Berkeley, California in 1995. At the time of her death in 1995, Cailleau was survived by her niece, Denise Norris of San Jose and her nephew, John Cailleau (an active member of the gay rights movement who died in 2005).
