= MDA-MB-468 =

Cell line used in breast cancer research

MDA-MB-468 is a cell line that was isolated from a 51-year-old female human in 1977, and is commonly used in breast cancer research. MDA-MB-468 cells were extracted from a pleural effusion of mammary gland and breast tissues, and have proven useful for the study of metastasis, migration, and breast cancer proliferation.

The cell line was isolated in 1977 by Relda Cailleau, et al., from a pleural effusion of a 51-year-old Black female patient with metastatic adenocarcinoma of the breast. Although the tissue donor was heterozygous for G6PD alleles, the cell line consistently showed only the G6PD A phenotype. MDA-MB-468 cells have a modal chromosome number of 64, though the actual number can vary from 60 to 67 in different cells.

MDA-MB-468 has been used to test chemical breast cancer treatments.

== See also ==
- MCF-7
