= CYP2F1 =

Protein-coding gene in the species Homo sapiens

Identifiers
- Aliases: CYP2F1, C2F1, CYP2F, CYPIIF1, cytochrome P450 family 2 subfamily F member 1
- External IDs: OMIM: 124070; MGI: 88608; GeneCards: CYP2F1
Enzyme activity
EC #	BRENDA	ExPASy	KEGG	MetaCyc
1.14.14.1	↗	↗	↗	↗

Gene location (Human)
Chr.	Chromosome 19 (human)
Band	19q13.2	Start	41,114,432 bp
Band	19q13.2	End	41,128,381 bp

Gene location (Mouse)
Chr.	Chromosome 7 (mouse)
Band	7|7 A3	Start	26,819,334 bp
Band	7|7 A3	End	26,833,085 bp
RNA expression pattern
Bgee	Human / Mouse (ortholog); Top expressed in: testicle; olfactory zone of nasal mucosa; gonad; stromal cell of endometrium; right lung; right testis; left testis; sural nerve; minor salivary glands; bone marrow / Top expressed in: right lung; right lung lobe; olfactory system; olfactory epithelium; left lobe of liver; lacrimal gland; conjunctival fornix; parotid gland; esophagus; left lung; More reference expression data
BioGPS	n/a
Gene ontology
Molecular function	iron ion binding; oxygen binding; arachidonic acid epoxygenase activity; oxidoreductase activity, acting on paired donors, with incorporation or reduction of molecular oxygen, reduced flavin or flavoprotein as one donor, and incorporation of one atom of oxygen; metal ion binding; monooxygenase activity; heme binding; oxidoreductase activity, acting on paired donors, with incorporation or reduction of molecular oxygen; oxidoreductase activity; aromatase activity; steroid hydroxylase activity
Cellular component	organelle membrane; endoplasmic reticulum membrane; intracellular membrane-bounded organelle; membrane; endoplasmic reticulum; cytoplasm
Biological process	epoxygenase P450 pathway; trichloroethylene metabolic process; xenobiotic metabolic process; response to toxic substance; organic acid metabolic process
Sources:Amigo / QuickGO
Orthologs
Databases	NCBI: entry; OMA: entry
Species	Human	Mouse
Entrez	1572	13107
Ensembl	ENSG00000197446	ENSMUSG00000052974
UniProt	P24903	P33267
RefSeq (mRNA)	NM_000774	NM_007817
RefSeq (protein)	NP_000765	NP_031843
Location (UCSC)	Chr 19: 41.11 – 41.13 Mb	Chr 7: 26.82 – 26.83 Mb
PubMed search
- Wikidata
View/Edit Human	View/Edit Mouse

Cytochrome P450 2F1 is a protein that in humans is encoded by the CYP2F1 gene.

This gene encodes a member of the cytochrome P450 superfamily of enzymes. The cytochrome P450 proteins are monooxygenases which catalyze many reactions involved in drug metabolism and synthesis of cholesterol, steroids and other lipids. This protein localizes to the endoplasmic reticulum and is known to dehydrogenate 3-methylindole, an endogenous toxin derived from the fermentation of tryptophan, as well as xenobiotic substrates, such as naphthalene and ethoxycoumarin. This gene is part of a large cluster of cytochrome P450 genes from the CYP2A, CYP2B and CYP2F subfamilies on chromosome 19q.
