= Cyclooxygenase-2 =

Human enzyme involved in inflammation

PTGS2
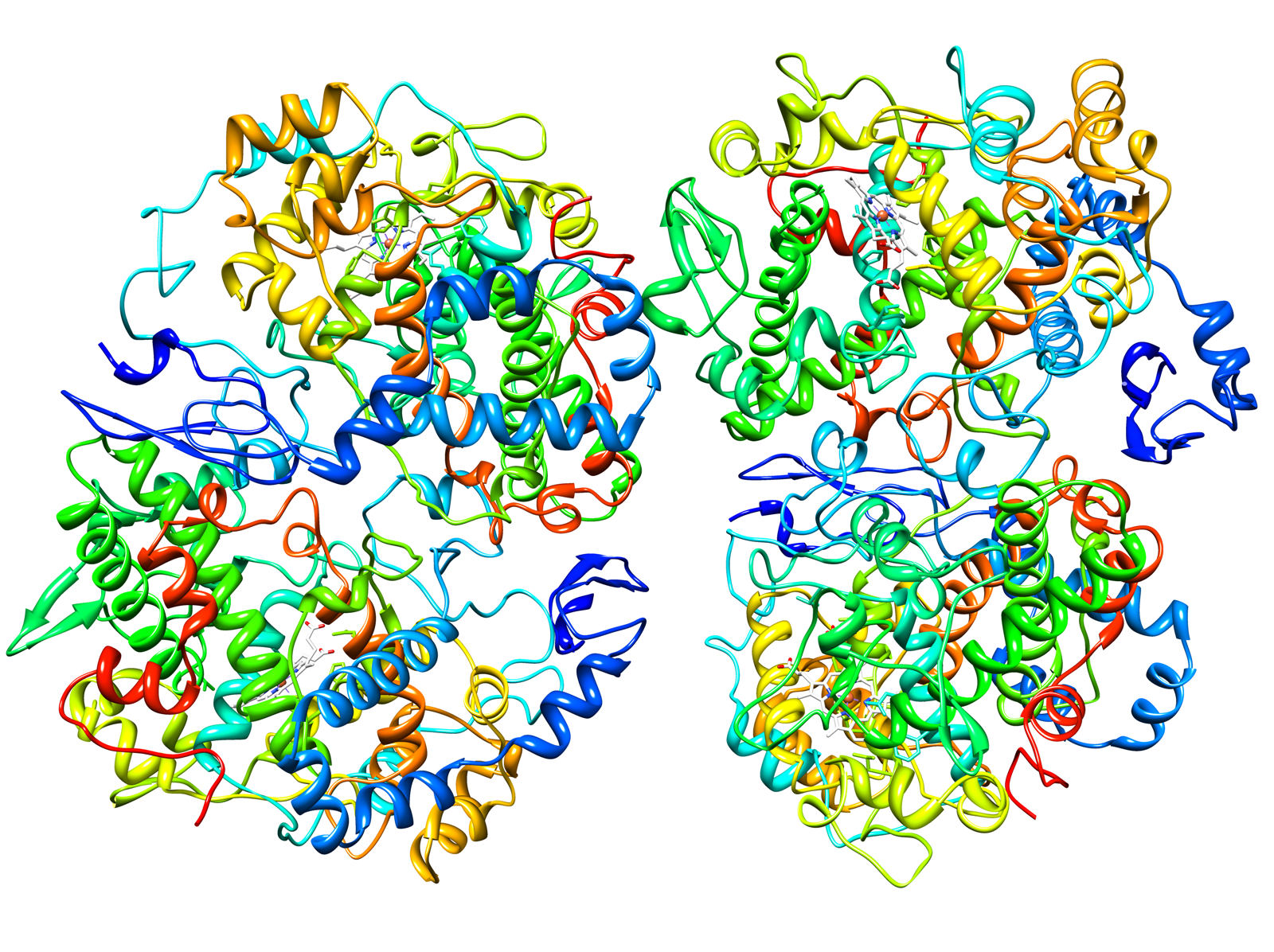

Identifiers
- Aliases: PTGS2, COX-2, COX2, GRIPGHS, PGG/HS, PGHS-2, PHS-2, hCox-2, prostaglandin-endoperoxide synthase 2
- External IDs: OMIM: 600262; MGI: 97798; GeneCards: PTGS2
Available structures
PDB	Ortholog search: PDBe RCSB
PDB	List of PDB id codes 5F1A, 5F19, 5IKQ, 5IKT, 5IKV, 5IKR
Enzyme activity
EC #	BRENDA	ExPASy	KEGG	MetaCyc
1.14.99.1	↗	↗	↗	↗

Gene location (Human)
Chr.	Chromosome 1 (human)
Band	1q31.1	Start	186,671,791 bp
Band	1q31.1	End	186,680,922 bp

Gene location (Mouse)
Chr.	Chromosome 1 (mouse)
Band	1 G1|1 63.84 cM	Start	149,975,782 bp
Band	1 G1|1 63.84 cM	End	149,983,978 bp
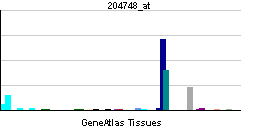
RNA expression pattern
Bgee	Human / Mouse (ortholog); Top expressed in: seminal vesicula; cartilage tissue; mucosa of urinary bladder; beta cell; periodontal fiber; vena cava; visceral pleura; saphenous vein; mucosa of paranasal sinus; gallbladder / Top expressed in: granulocyte; decidua; gastrula; stroma of bone marrow; dentate gyrus; cumulus cell; endothelial cell of lymphatic vessel; right lung lobe; calvaria; subdivision of hippocampus; More reference expression data
BioGPS	More reference expression data
Gene ontology
Molecular function	arachidonate 15-lipoxygenase activity; metal ion binding; heme binding; enzyme binding; oxidoreductase activity; protein homodimerization activity; dioxygenase activity; protein binding; peroxidase activity; prostaglandin-endoperoxide synthase activity; oxidoreductase activity, acting on single donors with incorporation of molecular oxygen, incorporation of two atoms of oxygen; transferase activity
Cellular component	cytoplasm; endoplasmic reticulum lumen; membrane; caveola; neuron projection; organelle membrane; endoplasmic reticulum; intracellular membrane-bounded organelle; endoplasmic reticulum membrane; protein-containing complex
Biological process	response to fructose; learning; response to organic substance; lipoxygenase pathway; cellular response to mechanical stimulus; response to manganese ion; angiogenesis; cellular response to hypoxia; embryo implantation; negative regulation of cell population proliferation; response to cytokine; negative regulation of smooth muscle contraction; memory; response to oxidative stress; maintenance of blood-brain barrier; response to lithium ion; response to tumor necrosis factor; fatty acid biosynthetic process; positive regulation of synaptic transmission, glutamatergic; positive regulation of vasoconstriction; response to organonitrogen compound; inflammatory response; positive regulation of smooth muscle contraction; bone mineralization; response to fatty acid; response to vitamin D; cellular response to UV; positive regulation of fever generation; cellular response to fluid shear stress; positive regulation of synaptic plasticity; regulation of blood pressure; response to lipopolysaccharide; positive regulation of platelet-derived growth factor production; regulation of inflammatory response; brown fat cell differentiation; sensory perception of pain; response to radiation; prostaglandin biosynthetic process; cellular response to ATP; ovulation; positive regulation of smooth muscle cell proliferation; hair cycle; response to estradiol; positive regulation of cell death; positive regulation of cell migration involved in sprouting angiogenesis; response to organic cyclic compound; lipid metabolism; positive regulation of nitric oxide biosynthetic process; response to glucocorticoid; cyclooxygenase pathway; fatty acid metabolic process; positive regulation of fibroblast growth factor production; decidualization; regulation of cell population proliferation; positive regulation of cell population proliferation; negative regulation of calcium ion transport; positive regulation of apoptotic process; positive regulation of transforming growth factor beta production; positive regulation of vascular endothelial growth factor production; positive regulation of brown fat cell differentiation; negative regulation of synaptic transmission, dopaminergic; cellular oxidant detoxification; ageing; NAD biosynthesis via nicotinamide riboside salvage pathway; cellular response to heat; positive regulation of prostaglandin biosynthetic process; positive regulation of peptidyl-serine phosphorylation; negative regulation of apoptotic process; negative regulation of cysteine-type endopeptidase activity involved in apoptotic process; cellular response to non-ionic osmotic stress; negative regulation of intrinsic apoptotic signaling pathway in response to osmotic stress; cellular response to lead ion; response to angiotensin; prostaglandin metabolic process; positive regulation of protein import into nucleus; cytokine-mediated signaling pathway; long-chain fatty acid biosynthetic process; negative regulation of cell cycle; regulation of neuroinflammatory response
Sources:Amigo / QuickGO
Orthologs
Databases	NCBI: entry; OMA: entry
Species	Human	Mouse
Entrez	5743	19225
Ensembl	ENSG00000073756	ENSMUSG00000032487
UniProt	P35354	Q05769
RefSeq (mRNA)	NM_000963	NM_011198
RefSeq (protein)	NP_000954	NP_035328
Location (UCSC)	Chr 1: 186.67 – 186.68 Mb	Chr 1: 149.98 – 149.98 Mb
PubMed search
- Wikidata
View/Edit Human	View/Edit Mouse

Cyclooxygenase-2 (COX-2), also known as prostaglandin-endoperoxide synthase 2 (HUGO PTGS2), is an enzyme that in humans is encoded by the PTGS2 gene. In humans it is one of three cyclooxygenases. It is involved in the conversion of arachidonic acid to prostaglandin H_{2}, an important precursor of prostacyclin, which is expressed in inflammation.

== Function ==
PTGS2 (COX-2), converts arachidonic acid (AA) to prostaglandin endoperoxide H2. PTGSs are targets for NSAIDs and PTGS2 (COX-2) specific inhibitors called coxibs. PTGS-2 is a sequence homodimer. Each monomer of the enzyme has a peroxidase and a PTGS (COX) active site. The PTGS (COX) enzymes catalyze the conversion of AA to prostaglandins in two steps. First, hydrogen is abstracted from carbon 13 of arachidonic acid, and then two molecules of oxygen are added by the PTGS2 (COX-2), giving PGG_{2}. Second, PGG_{2} is reduced to PGH_{2} in the peroxidase active site. The synthesized PGH_{2} is converted to prostaglandins (PGD_{2}, PGE_{2}, PGF_{2α}), prostacyclin (PGI_{2}), or thromboxane A_{2} by tissue-specific isomerases (Figure 2).

While metabolizing arachidonic acid primarily to PGG_{2}, COX-2 also converts this fatty acid to small amounts of a racemic mixture of 15-hydroxyicosatetraenoic acids (i.e., 15-HETEs) composed of ~22% 15(R)-HETE and ~78% 15(S)-HETE stereoisomers as well as a small amount of 11(R)-HETE. The two 15-HETE stereoisomers have intrinsic biological activities but, perhaps more importantly, can be further metabolized to a major class of agents, the lipoxins. Furthermore, aspirin-treated COX-2 metabolizes arachidonic acid almost exclusively to 15(R)-HETE which product can be further metabolized to epi-lipoxins. The lipoxins and epi-lipoxins are potent anti-inflammatory agents and may contribute to the overall activities of the two COX's as well as to aspirin.

COX-2 is naturally inhibited by calcitriol (the active form of vitamin D).

== Mechanism ==
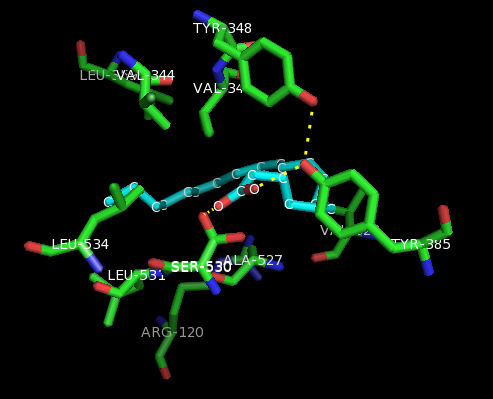
Arachidonic acid bound to the PTGS2 (COX-2) enzyme. Polar interactions between arachidonic acid (cyan) and Ser-530 and Tyr-385 residues are shown with yellow dashed lines. The substrate is stabilized by hydrophobic interactions.

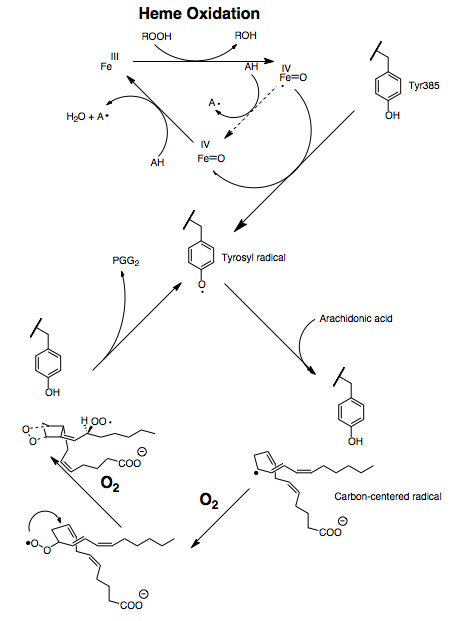
Mechanism of COX activation and catalysis. A hydroperoxide oxidizes the heme to a ferryl-oxo derivative that either is reduced in the first step of the peroxidase cycle or oxidizes Tyrosine 385 to a tyrosyl radical. The tyrosyl radical can then oxidize the 13-pro(S) hydrogen of arachidonic acid to initiate the COX cycle.

Both the peroxidase and PTGS activities are inactivated during catalysis by mechanism-based, first-order processes, which means that PGHS-2 peroxidase or PTGS activities fall to zero within 1–2 minutes, even in the presence of sufficient substrates.

The conversion of arachidonic acid to PGG_{2} can be shown as a series of radical reactions analogous to polyunsaturated fatty acid autoxidation. The 13-pro(S) -hydrogen is abstracted and dioxygen traps the pentadienyl radical at carbon 11. The 11-peroxyl radical cyclizes at carbon 9 and the carbon-centered radical generated at C-8 cyclizes at carbon 12, generating the endoperoxide. The allylic radical generated is trapped by dioxygen at carbon 15 to form the 15-(S) -peroxyl radical; this radical is then reduced to PGG_{2}. This is supported by the following evidence: 1) a significant kinetic isotope effect is observed for the abstraction of the 13-pro (S)-hydrogen; 2) carbon-centered radicals are trapped during catalysis; 3) small amounts of oxidation products are formed due to the oxygen trapping of an allylic radical intermediate at positions 13 and 15.

Another mechanism in which the 13-pro (S)-hydrogen is deprotonated and the carbanion is oxidized to a radical is theoretically possible. However, oxygenation of 10,10-difluoroarachidonic acid to 11-(S)-hydroxyeicosa-5,8,12,14-tetraenoic acid is not consistent with the generation of a carbanion intermediate because it would eliminate fluoride to form a conjugated diene. The absence of endoperoxide-containing products derived from 10,10-difluoroarachidonic acid has been thought to indicate the importance of a C-10 carbocation in PGG_{2} synthesis. However, the cationic mechanism requires that endoperoxide formation comes before the removal of the 13-pro (S)-hydrogen. This is not consistent with the results of the isotope experiments of arachidonic acid oxygenation.

== Structure ==
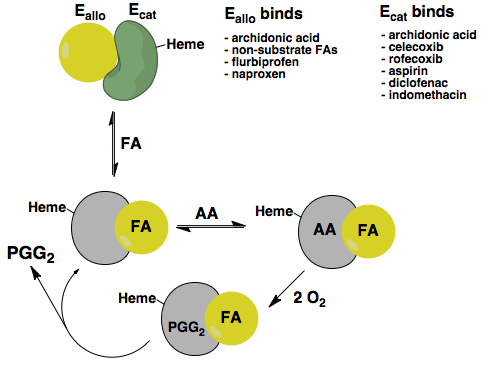
As shown, different ligands bind either the allosteric or the catalytic subunit. Allosteric subunit binds a non-substrate, activating FA (e.g., palmitic acid). The allosteric subunit with bound fatty acid activates the catalytic subunit by decreasing the Km for AA.

PTGS2 (COX-2) exists as a homodimer, each monomer with a molecular mass of about 70 kDa. The tertiary and quaternary structures of PTGS1 (COX-1) and PTGS2 (COX-2) enzymes are almost identical. Each subunit has three different structural domains: a short N-terminal epidermal growth factor (EGF) domain; an α-helical membrane-binding moiety; and a C-terminal catalytic domain. PTGS (COX, which can be confused with "cytochrome oxidase") enzymes are monotopic membrane proteins; the membrane-binding domain consists of a series of amphipathic α helices with several hydrophobic amino acids exposed to a membrane monolayer. PTGS1 (COX-1) and PTGS2 (COX-2) are bifunctional enzymes that carry out two consecutive chemical reactions in spatially distinct but mechanistically coupled active sites. Both the cyclooxygenase and the peroxidase active sites are located in the catalytic domain, which accounts for approximately 80% of the protein. The catalytic domain is homologous to mammalian peroxidases such as myeloperoxidase.

It has been found that human PTGS2 (COX-2) functions as a conformational heterodimer having a catalytic monomer (E-cat) and an allosteric monomer (E-allo). Heme binds only to the peroxidase site of E-cat while substrates, as well as certain inhibitors (e.g. celecoxib), bind the COX site of E-cat. E-cat is regulated by E-allo in a way dependent on what ligand is bound to E-allo. Substrate and non-substrate fatty acids (FAs) and some PTGS (COX) inhibitors (e.g. naproxen) preferentially bind to the PTGS (COX) site of E-allo. Arachidonic acid can bind to E-cat and E-allo, but the affinity of AA for E-allo is 25 times that for Ecat. Palmitic acid, an efficacious stimulator of huPGHS-2, binds only E-allo in palmitic acid/murine PGHS-2 co-crystals. Non-substrate FAs can potentiate or attenuate PTGS (COX) inhibitors depending on the fatty acid and whether the inhibitor binds E-cat or E-allo. Studies suggest that the concentration and composition of the free fatty acid pool in the environment in which PGHS-2 functions in cells, also referred to as the FA tone, is a key factor regulating the activity of PGHS-2 and its response to PTGS (COX) inhibitors.

== Clinical significance ==
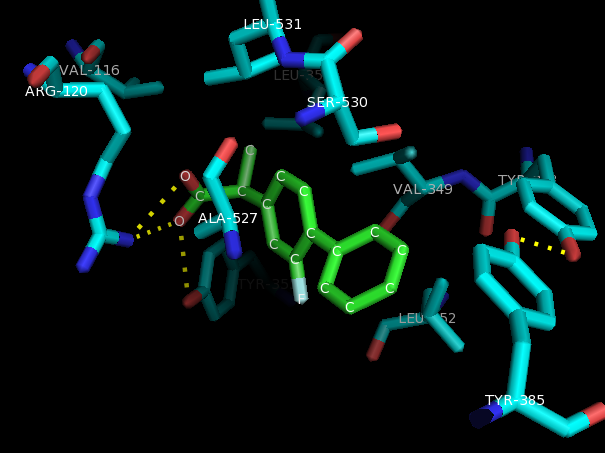
NSAID (non-specific inhibitor of PTGS2 (COX-2)) flurbiprofen (green) bound to PTGS2 (COX-2). Flurbiprofen is stabilized via hydrophobic interactions and polar interactions (Tyr-355 and Arg-120).

PTGS2 (COX-2) is unexpressed under normal conditions in most cells, but elevated levels are found during inflammation. PTGS1 (COX-1) is constitutively expressed in many tissues and is the predominant form in gastric mucosa and in the kidneys. Inhibition of PTGS1 (COX-1) reduces the basal production of cytoprotective PGE_{2} and PGI_{2} in the stomach, which may contribute to gastric ulceration. Since PTGS2 (COX-2) is generally expressed only in cells where prostaglandins are upregulated (e.g., during inflammation), drug-candidates that selectively inhibit PTGS2 (COX-2) were suspected to show fewer side-effects but proved to substantially increase risk for cardiovascular events such as heart attack and stroke. Two different mechanisms may explain contradictory effects. Low-dose aspirin protects against heart attacks and strokes by blocking PTGS1 (COX-1) from forming a prostaglandin called thromboxane A2. It sticks platelets together and promotes clotting; inhibiting this helps prevent heart disease. On the other hand, PTGS2 (COX-2) is a more important source of prostaglandins, particularly prostacyclin which is found in blood vessel lining. Prostacyclin relaxes or unsticks platelets, so selective COX-2 inhibitors (coxibs) increase risk of cardiovascular events due to clotting.

Non-steroidal anti-inflammatory drugs (NSAIDs) inhibit prostaglandin production by PTGS1 (COX-1) and PTGS2 (COX-2). NSAIDs selective for inhibition of PTGS2 (COX-2) are less likely than traditional drugs to cause gastrointestinal adverse effects, but could cause cardiovascular events, such as heart failure, myocardial infarction, and stroke. Studies with human pharmacology and genetics, genetically manipulated rodents, and other animal models and randomized trials indicate that this is due to suppression of PTGS2 (COX-2)-dependent cardioprotective prostaglandins, prostacyclin in particular.

The expression of PTGS2 (COX-2) is upregulated in many cancers. The overexpression of PTGS2 (COX-2) along with increased angiogenesis and SLC2A1 (GLUT-1) expression is significantly associated with gallbladder carcinomas. Furthermore, the product of PTGS2 (COX-2), PGH_{2} is converted by prostaglandin E_{2} synthase into PGE_{2}, which in turn can stimulate cancer progression. Consequently, inhibiting PTGS2 (COX-2) may have benefit in the prevention and treatment of these types of cancer.

COX-2 expression was found in human idiopathic epiretinal membranes. Cyclooxygenases blocking by lornoxicam in acute stage of inflammation reduced the frequency of membrane formation by 43% in the dispase model of PVR and by 31% in the concanavalin one. Lornoxicam not only normalized the expression of cyclooxygenases in both models of PVR, but also neutralized the changes of the retina and the choroid thickness caused by the injection of pro-inflammatory agents. These facts underline the importance of cyclooxygenases and prostaglandins in the development of PVR.

PTGS2 gene upregulation has also been linked with multiple stages of human reproduction. Presence of gene is found in the chorionic plate, in the amnion epithelium, syncytiotrophoblasts, villous fibroblasts, chorionic trophoblasts, amniotic trophoblasts, as well as the basal plate of the placenta, in the decidual cells and extravillous cytotrophoblasts. During the process of chorioamnionitis/deciduitis, the upregulation of PTGS2 in the amnion and choriodecidua is one of three limited effects of inflammation in the uterus. Increased expression of the PTGS2 gene in the fetal membranes is connected to the presence of inflammation, causing uterine prostaglandin gene expression and immunolocalization of prostaglandin pathway proteins in chorionic trophoblast cells and adjacent decidua, or choriodecidua. PTGS2 is linked with the inflammatory system and has been observed in inflammatory leukocytes. It has been noted that there is a positive correlation with PTGS2 expression in the amnion during spontaneous labour and was discovered to have increased expression with gestational age following the presence of labour with no change observed in amnion and choriodecidua during either preterm or term labour. Additionally, oxytocin stimulates the expression of PTGS2 in myometrial cells.

The mutant allele PTGS2 5939C carriers among the Han Chinese population have been shown to have a higher risk of gastric cancer. In addition, a connection was found between Helicobacter pylori infection and the presence of the 5939C allele.

During an ischemic stroke, the deprivation of oxygen and glucose triggers a cascade of inflammatory responses, leading to increased COX-2 expression, particularly in neurons, glial cells, and endothelial cells. This upregulation contributes to the production of pro-inflammatory prostaglandins such as PGE2, which exacerbates neuronal damage by promoting excitotoxicity, oxidative stress, and apoptosis. Additionally, COX-2-derived prostaglandins can impair the integrity of the BBB, allowing peripheral immune cells and inflammatory mediators to infiltrate the brain, further worsening cerebral injury.

== Interactions ==
PTGS2 has been shown to interact with caveolin 1.

== History ==
PTGS2 (COX-2) was discovered in 1991 by the Daniel Simmons laboratory at Brigham Young University.

== See also ==
- Arachidonic acid
- Cyclooxygenase
- Cyclooxygenase 1
- NSAID
- Discovery and development of COX-2 selective inhibitors
- COX-2 selective inhibitor
