= CYP2A13 =

Protein-coding gene in the species Homo sapiens

Identifiers
- Aliases: CYP2A13, CPAD, CYP2A, CYPIIA13, cytochrome P450 family 2 subfamily A member 13
- External IDs: OMIM: 608055; MGI: 88597; GeneCards: CYP2A13
Available structures
PDB	Ortholog search: PDBe RCSB
PDB	List of PDB id codes 2P85, 2PG5, 2PG6, 2PG7, 3T3S, 4EJG, 4EJH, 4EJI
Enzyme activity
EC #	BRENDA	ExPASy	KEGG	MetaCyc
1.14.14.1	↗	↗	↗	↗

Gene location (Human)
Chr.	Chromosome 19 (human)
Band	19q13.2	Start	41,088,451 bp
Band	19q13.2	End	41,096,195 bp

Gene location (Mouse)
Chr.	Chromosome 7 (mouse)
Band	7 A3|7 15.54 cM	Start	26,534,730 bp
Band	7 A3|7 15.54 cM	End	26,542,973 bp
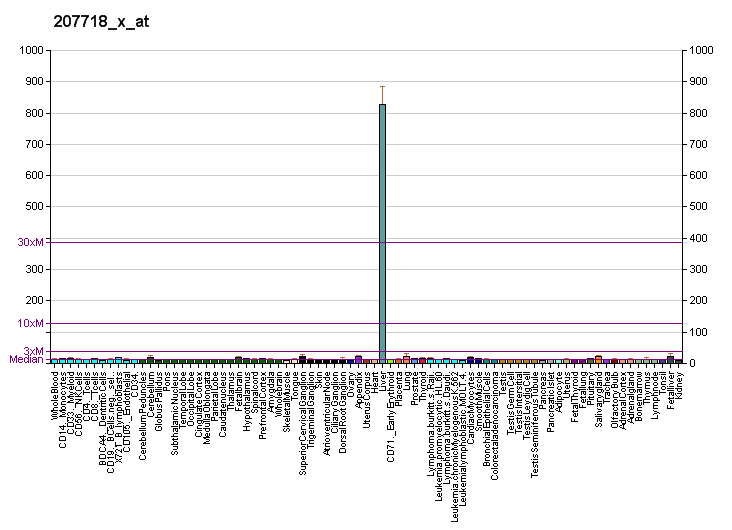

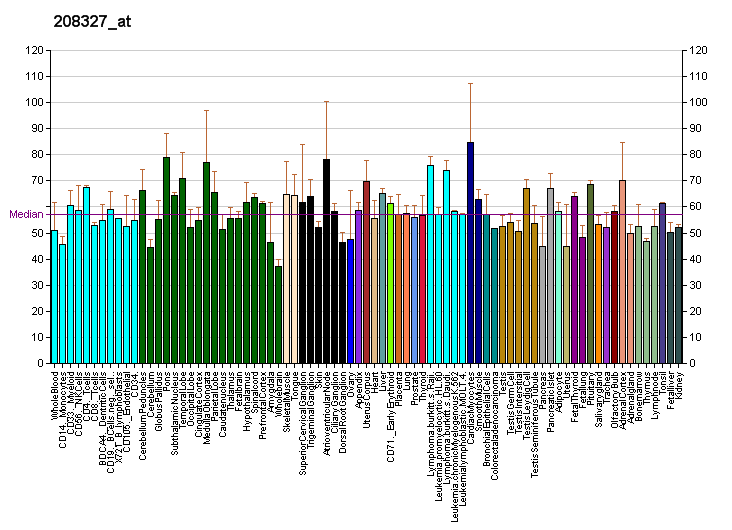

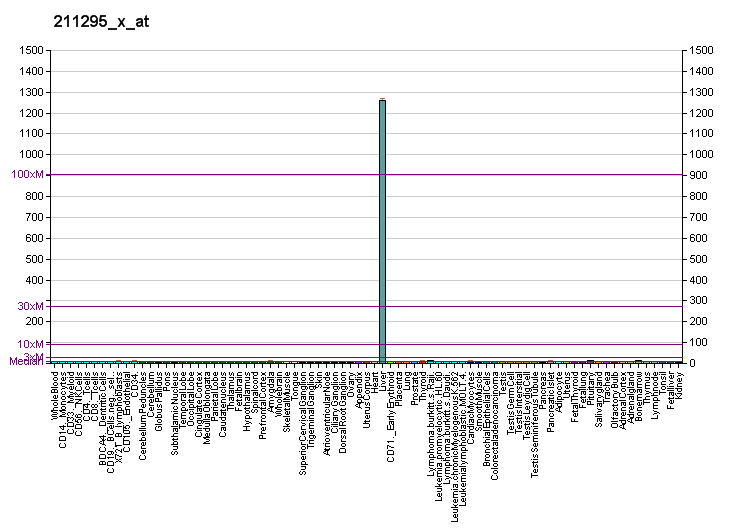
RNA expression pattern
Bgee	Human / Mouse (ortholog); Top expressed in: nasal epithelium; olfactory zone of nasal mucosa; Brodmann area 10; quadriceps femoris muscle; paraflocculus of cerebellum; mucosa of paranasal sinus; middle frontal gyrus; frontal pole; epithelium of bronchus; bronchial epithelial cell / Top expressed in: proximal tubule; human kidney; right kidney; hepatobiliary system; liver; esophagus; respiratory epithelium; thymus; nasal epithelium; olfactory epithelium; More reference expression data
BioGPS	More reference expression data
Gene ontology
Molecular function	iron ion binding; oxidoreductase activity; aromatase activity; arachidonic acid epoxygenase activity; oxidoreductase activity, acting on paired donors, with incorporation or reduction of molecular oxygen, reduced flavin or flavoprotein as one donor, and incorporation of one atom of oxygen; heme binding; oxidoreductase activity, acting on paired donors, with incorporation or reduction of molecular oxygen; metal ion binding; coumarin 7-hydroxylase activity; steroid hydroxylase activity; monooxygenase activity
Cellular component	organelle membrane; endoplasmic reticulum membrane; endoplasmic reticulum; membrane; intracellular membrane-bounded organelle; cytoplasm
Biological process	xenobiotic metabolic process; epoxygenase P450 pathway; coumarin metabolic process; organic acid metabolic process
Sources:Amigo / QuickGO
Orthologs
Databases	NCBI: entry; OMA: entry
Species	Human	Mouse
Entrez	1553	13087
Ensembl	ENSG00000197838	ENSMUSG00000005547
UniProt	Q16696	P20852
RefSeq (mRNA)	NM_000766	NM_007812
RefSeq (protein)	NP_000757	n/a
Location (UCSC)	Chr 19: 41.09 – 41.1 Mb	Chr 7: 26.53 – 26.54 Mb
PubMed search
- Wikidata
View/Edit Human	View/Edit Mouse

Cytochrome P450 2A13 is a protein that in humans is encoded by the CYP2A13 gene.

This gene encodes a member of the cytochrome P450 superfamily of enzymes. The cytochrome P450 proteins are monooxygenases which catalyze many reactions involved in drug metabolism and synthesis of cholesterol, steroids and other lipids. This protein localizes to the endoplasmic reticulum. Although its endogenous substrate has not been determined, it is known to metabolize 4-(methylnitrosamino)-1-(3-pyridyl)-1-butanone, a major nitrosamine specific to tobacco. This gene is part of a large cluster of cytochrome P450 genes from the CYP2A, CYP2B and CYP2F subfamilies on chromosome 19q.
