= Daniel A. Simmons =

British writer

Daniel Augustus Simmons is an author known for creating self-psychology literature. An example of his work is "The Realization System," self-published by Judge Simmons during the 1920s in the US as a Private Course of 12 Lessons in Practical Psychology, and published in book form in the U.K. some years later. (1936, Psychology Publishing Co. Manchester), and now available in audio and ebook form.

Another text by Judge Simmons which is now available in the public domain is The Science of Religion: Fundamental Faiths Expressed In Modern Terms (1916).

Concepts covered in this author's work include The Law of Attraction, made famous in recent years by the resurgence of interest in Charles F. Haanel and his most popular work The Master Key System and Subconscious programming through auto-suggestion.
