= Daniel L. Simmons =

American professor

Daniel L. Simmons is a professor of chemistry and former director of the Cancer Research Center at Brigham Young University (BYU). He was the discoverer of the COX-2 enzyme that is the target of celecoxib (Celebrex) and other COX-2 inhibitors. He and BYU felt that Pfizer had not properly credited or paid them for Simmons work in this development and brought a suit against Pfizer.

In 2014, the Cancer Research Center at Brigham Young University was renamed The Simmons Center for Cancer Research in his honor after he stepped down as director after 17 years.

Simmons has bachelor's and master's degrees from BYU. He earned his Ph.D. from the University of Wisconsin in 1986. From 1986-1989 he held a post-doctoral Fellowship at Harvard University.

Simmons discovered the COX-2 and COX-3 enzymes.

== Sources ==
- Thomson, Linda (October 28, 2009). "Judge orders Pfizer to pay BYU $852K for suit delays". Deseret News. Archived from the original on October 31, 2009.
- BYU Chemistry Department bio of Simmons
- Utah Science medals awards including a short bio of Simmons
