= HaCaT =

Cell line

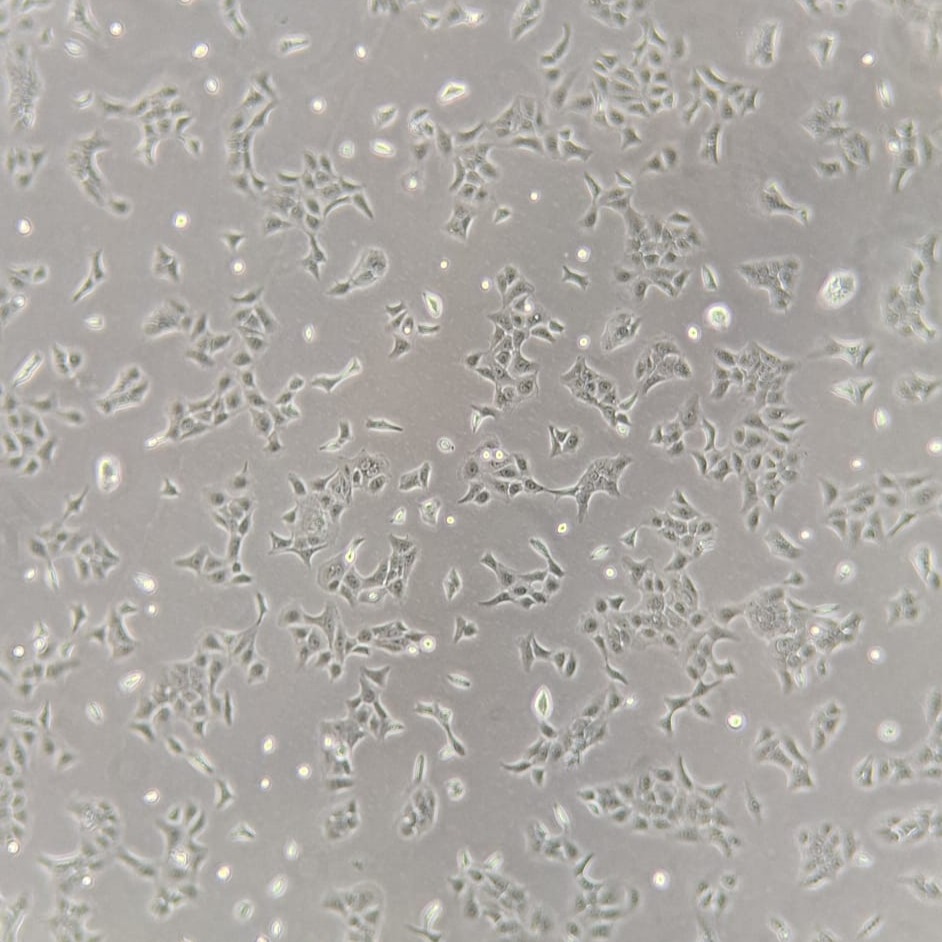
HaCaT cells (human keratinocytes) at 30-40% confluence, observed via phase contrast microscopy at 100x magnification.

HaCaT is a spontaneously transformed aneuploid immortal keratinocyte cell line from adult human skin, widely used in scientific research. HaCaT cells are utilized for their high capacity to differentiate and proliferate in vitro. Their use in research allows for the characterization of human keratinocyte using a model that is reproducible and addresses issues such as short culture lifespan and variations between cell lines that would otherwise be encountered. These cells have allowed the characterization of several processes, such as their utilization as a model system for vitamin D_{3} metabolism in the skin.
