= Cyclooxygenase =

Class of enzymes

Prostaglandin-endoperoxide synthase

Identifiers
- EC no.: 1.14.99.1
- CAS no.: 9055-65-6

Databases
- IntEnz: IntEnz view
- BRENDA: BRENDA entry
- ExPASy: NiceZyme view
- KEGG: KEGG entry
- MetaCyc: metabolic pathway
- PRIAM: profile
- PDB structures: RCSB PDB PDBe PDBsum
- Gene Ontology: AmiGO / QuickGO
Search
- PMC: articles
- PubMed: articles
- NCBI: proteins

Cyclooxygenase 1
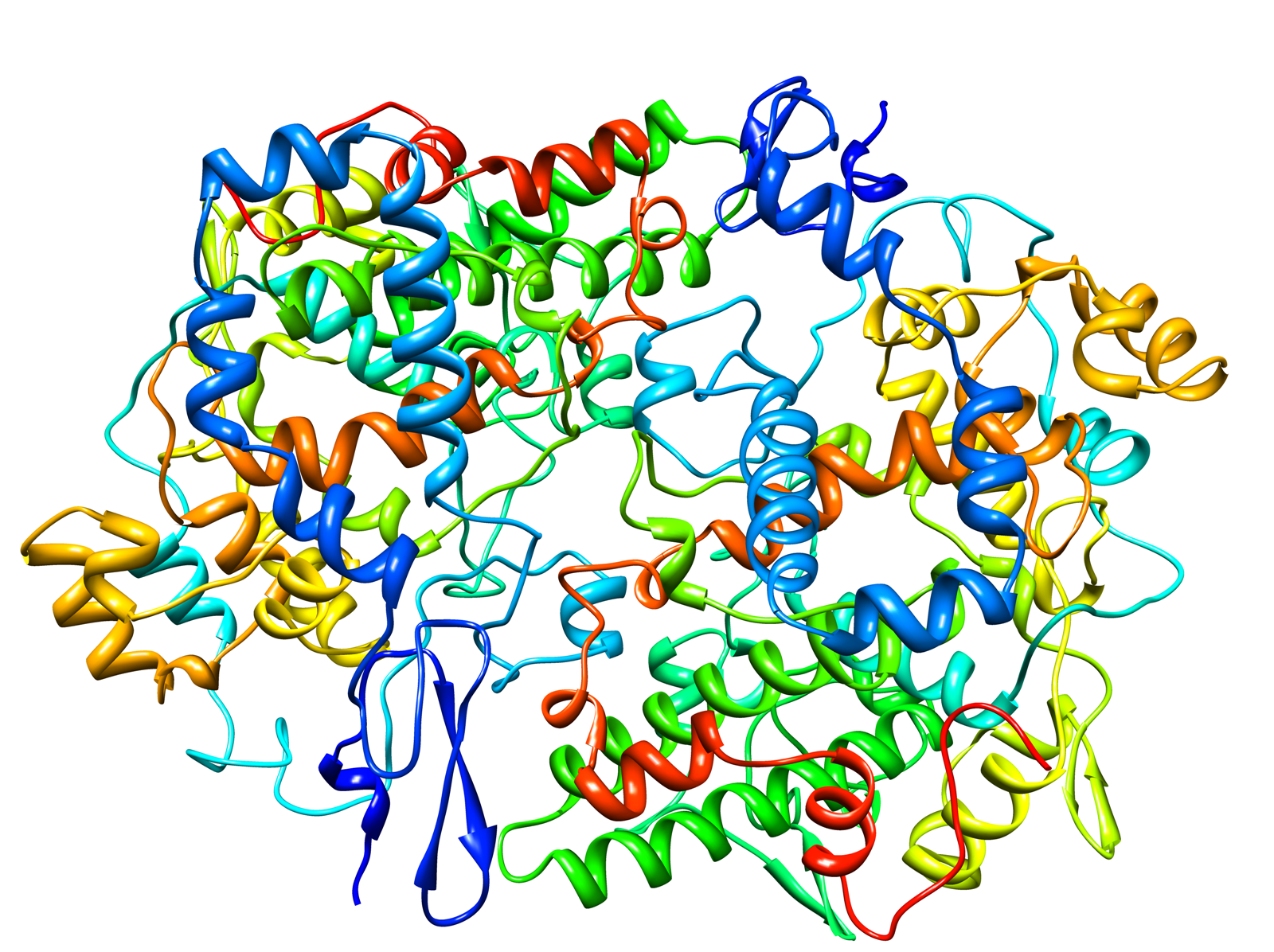
- Crystallographic structure of prostaglandin H2 synthase-1 complex with flurbiprofen

Identifiers
- Symbol: PTGS1
- Alt. symbols: COX-1
- NCBI gene: 5742
- HGNC: 9604
- OMIM: 176805
- PDB: 1CQE
- RefSeq: NM_080591
- UniProt: P23219

Other data
- EC number: 1.14.99.1
- Locus: Chr. 9 q32-q33.3
Search for
- Structures: Swiss-model
- Domains: InterPro

Cyclooxygenase 2
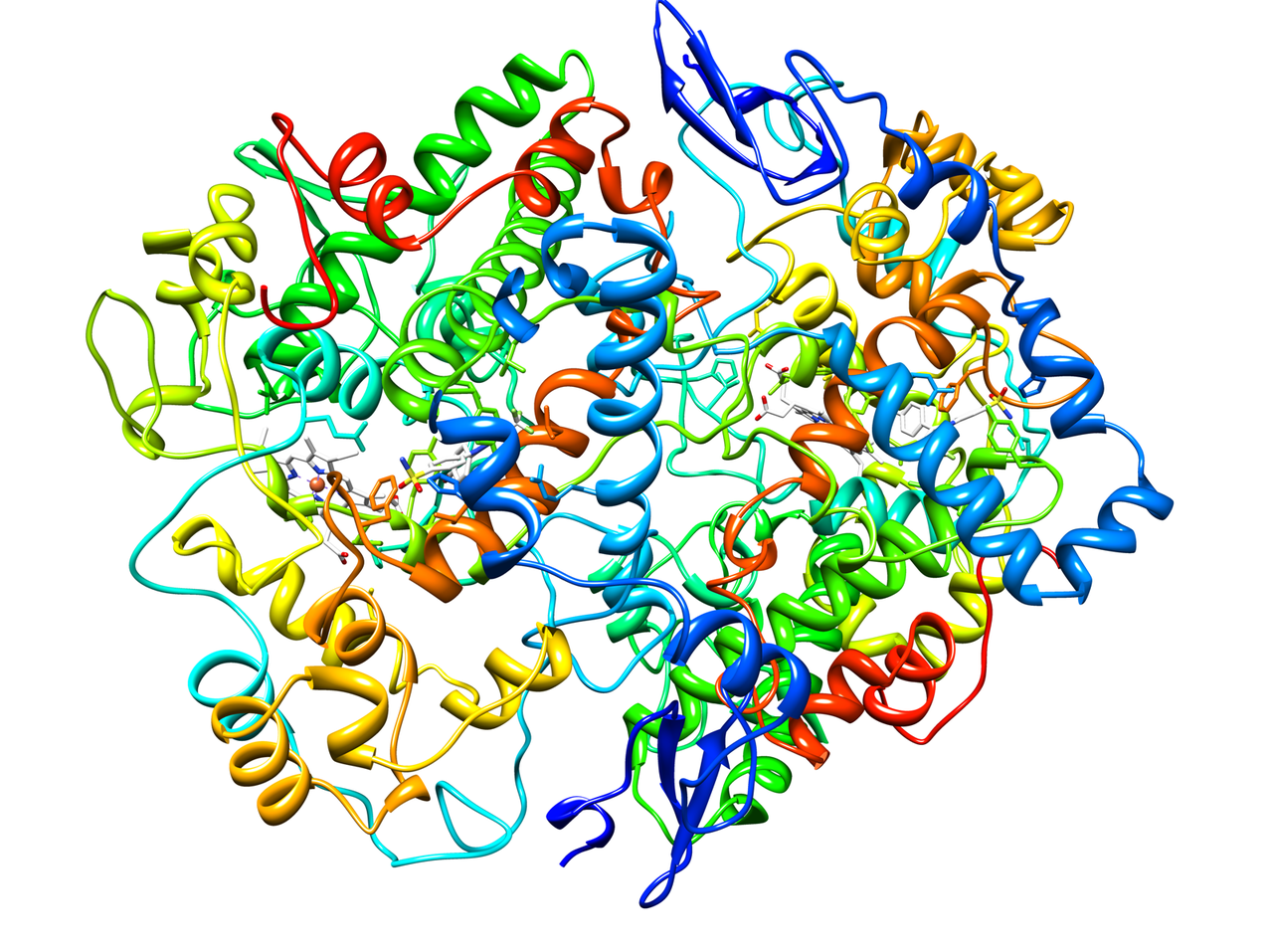
- Cyclooxygenase-2 (prostaglandin synthase-2) in complex with a COX-2 selective inhibitor

Identifiers
- Symbol: PTGS2
- Alt. symbols: COX-2
- NCBI gene: 5743
- HGNC: 9605
- OMIM: 600262
- PDB: 6COX
- RefSeq: NM_000963
- UniProt: P35354

Other data
- EC number: 1.14.99.1
- Locus: Chr. 1 q25.2-25.3
Search for
- Structures: Swiss-model
- Domains: InterPro

Cyclooxygenase (COX), officially known as prostaglandin-endoperoxide synthase (PTGS), is an enzyme (specifically, a family of isozymes, EC 1.14.99.1) that is responsible for biosynthesis of prostanoids, including thromboxane and prostaglandins such as prostacyclin, from arachidonic acid. A member of the animal-type heme peroxidase family, it is also known as prostaglandin G/H synthase. The specific reaction catalyzed is the conversion from arachidonic acid to prostaglandin H_{2} via a short-lived prostaglandin G_{2} intermediate.

Pharmaceutical inhibition of COX can provide relief from the symptoms of inflammation and pain. Nonsteroidal anti-inflammatory drugs (NSAIDs), such as aspirin and ibuprofen, exert their effects through inhibition of COX. Those that are specific to the COX-2 isozyme are called COX-2 inhibitors. The active metabolite (AM404) of paracetamol is a COX inhibitor, a fact to which some or all of its therapeutic effect has been attributed.

In medicine, the root symbol "COX" is encountered more often than "PTGS". In genetics, "PTGS" is officially used for this family of genes and proteins because the root symbol "COX" was already used for the cytochrome c oxidase family, but in the medical literature the two human isozymes, PTGS1 and PTGS2, are still frequently called COX-1 and COX-2. The names "prostaglandin synthase (PHS)", "prostaglandin synthetase (PHS)", and "prostaglandin-endoperoxide synthetase (PES)" are older terms still sometimes used to refer to COX.

== Biology ==
In terms of their molecular biology, COX-1 and COX-2 are of similar molecular weight, approximately 70 and 72 kDa, respectively, and having 65% amino acid sequence homology and near-identical catalytic sites. Both proteins have three domains: an N-terminal EGF-like domain, a small 4-helical membrane anchor, and a core heme-peroxidase catalytic domain. Both form dimers. The membrane anchor fixes the proteins into the endoplasmic reticulum (ER) and microsome membrane.

== Pharmacology ==
COX is a common target for anti-inflammatory drugs. The most significant difference between the isoenzymes, which allows for selective inhibition, is the substitution of isoleucine at position 523 in COX-1 with valine in COX-2. The smaller Val_{523} residue in COX-2 allows access to a hydrophobic side-pocket in the enzyme (which Ile_{523} sterically hinders). Drug molecules, such as DuP-697 and the coxibs derived from it, bind to this alternative site and are considered to be selective inhibitors of COX-2.

=== Classical NSAIDs ===
The main COX inhibitors are the non-steroidal anti-inflammatory drugs.

The classical COX inhibitors are not selective and inhibit all types of COX. The resulting inhibition of prostaglandin and thromboxane synthesis has the effect of reduced inflammation, as well as antipyretic, antithrombotic and analgesic effects. The most frequent adverse effect of NSAIDs is irritation of the gastric mucosa as prostaglandins normally have a protective role in the gastrointestinal tract. Some NSAIDs are also acidic which may cause additional damage to the gastrointestinal tract.

=== Newer NSAIDs ===
Selectivity for COX-2 is the main feature of celecoxib, etoricoxib, and other members of this drug class. Since COX-2 is mostly specific to inflammed tissue, selective COX-2 inhibitors avoid irritating the COX-1 enzymes of stomach lining and reduce peptic ulcers. However, selective COX-2 inhibitors reduce the platelet inhibitor prostacyclin, allowing COX-1 enzymes to excessively produce thromboxane lipids. Thus, selective COX-2 inhibitors raise the risk of blood clotting, resulting in kidney failure, heart attack, thrombosis, and stroke. Rofecoxib (brand name Vioxx) was withdrawn in 2004 because of such concerns. Some other COX-2 selective NSAIDs, such as celecoxib and etoricoxib, are still on the market.

=== Natural COX inhibition ===
Culinary mushrooms, like maitake, may be able to partially inhibit COX-1 and COX-2.

A variety of flavonoids have been found to inhibit COX-2.

Fish oils provide alternative fatty acids to arachidonic acid. These acids can be turned into some anti-inflammatory prostacyclins by COX instead of pro-inflammatory prostaglandins.

Hyperforin has been shown to inhibit COX-1 (but not COX-2) with a 3-18 times lower IC_{50} compared to aspirin, a range that may be relevant for typical doses.

Calcitriol (vitamin D) significantly inhibits the expression of the COX-2 gene.

Caution should be exercised in combining low dose aspirin with COX-2 inhibitors due to potential increased damage to the gastric mucosa. COX-2 is upregulated when COX-1 is suppressed with aspirin, which is thought to be important in enhancing mucosal defense mechanisms and lessening the erosion by aspirin.

=== Cardiovascular side-effects of COX inhibitors ===
COX-2 inhibitors have been found to increase the risk of atherothrombosis even with short-term use. A 2006 analysis of 139 randomised trials and almost 150,000 participants showed that selective COX-2 inhibitors are associated with a moderately increased risk of vascular events, mainly due to a twofold increased risk of myocardial infarction, and also that high-dose regimens of some traditional NSAIDs (such as diclofenac and ibuprofen, but not naproxen) are associated with a similar increase in risk of vascular events.

This evidence, however, has been contradicted by the 2016 PRECISION (Prospective Randomized Evaluation of Celecoxib Integrated Safety versus Ibuprofen or Naproxen) trial of 24,081 participants, which shows a lower incidence of cardiovascular death (including hemorrhagic death), nonfatal myocardial infarction, or nonfatal stroke for Celecoxib as compared to both Naproxen and Ibuprofen.

Fish oils (e.g., cod liver oil) have been proposed as a reasonable alternative for the treatment of rheumatoid arthritis and other conditions as a consequence of the fact that they provide less cardiovascular risk than other treatments including NSAIDs.

=== Effects of COX on the immune system ===
Inhibition of COX-2 using celecoxib has been shown to reduce the immunosuppressive TGFβ expression in hepatocytes attenuating EMT in human hepatocellular carcinoma

== See also ==
- Cyclooxygenase-1
- Cyclooxygenase-2
- Cyclooxygenase-3 (not functional in humans)
- Discovery and development of COX-2 selective inhibitors
