= Leukotriene B4 receptor 1 =

Protein-coding gene in the species Homo sapiens

LTB4R

Identifiers
- Aliases: LTB4R, BLT1, BLTR, CMKRL1, GPR16, LTB4R1, LTBR1, P2RY7, P2Y7, leukotriene B4 receptor
- External IDs: OMIM: 601531; MGI: 1309472; GeneCards: LTB4R

Gene location (Human)
Chr.	Chromosome 14 (human)
Band	14q12	Start	24,311,450 bp
Band	14q12	End	24,318,036 bp

Gene location (Mouse)
Chr.	Chromosome 14 (mouse)
Band	14 C3|14 28.19 cM	Start	56,003,419 bp
Band	14 C3|14 28.19 cM	End	56,005,951 bp
RNA expression pattern
Bgee	Human / Mouse (ortholog); Top expressed in: skin of abdomen; blood; skin of leg; monocyte; granulocyte; spleen; vagina; olfactory zone of nasal mucosa; bone marrow; minor salivary glands / Top expressed in: granulocyte; tibiofemoral joint; lip; bone marrow; skin of external ear; jejunum; embryo; embryo; blood; esophagus; More reference expression data
BioGPS	n/a
Gene ontology
Molecular function	nucleotide binding; G protein-coupled peptide receptor activity; G protein-coupled receptor activity; leukotriene receptor activity; signal transducer activity; leukotriene B4 receptor activity; galanin receptor activity
Cellular component	integral component of membrane; membrane raft; plasma membrane; integral component of plasma membrane; membrane
Biological process	G protein-coupled receptor signaling pathway; phospholipase C-activating G protein-coupled receptor signaling pathway; leukotriene signaling pathway; muscle contraction; neuropeptide signaling pathway; immune response; signal transduction; inflammatory response
Sources:Amigo / QuickGO
Orthologs
Databases	NCBI: entry; OMA: entry
Species	Human	Mouse
Entrez	1241	16995
Ensembl	ENSG00000213903; ENSG00000285456	ENSMUSG00000046908
UniProt	Q15722	O88855
RefSeq (mRNA)	NM_181657; NM_001143919	NM_008519
RefSeq (protein)	NP_001137391; NP_858043	NP_032545
Location (UCSC)	Chr 14: 24.31 – 24.32 Mb	Chr 14: 56 – 56.01 Mb
PubMed search
- Wikidata
View/Edit Human	View/Edit Mouse

Leukotriene B_{4} receptor 1, also known as BLT1 or BLT1 receptor, is a protein that in humans is encoded by the LTB4R gene.

== See also ==
- Eicosanoid receptor
- Etalocib, an antagonist at the leukotriene B_{4} receptor
