= Prostaglandin G2 =

Chemical compound

Prostaglandin G_{2}

Names
- IUPAC name (5Z)-7-{(1R,4S,5R,6R)-6-[(1E,3S)-3-Hydroperoxy-1-octen-1-yl]-2,3-dioxabicyclo[2.2.1]hept-5-yl}-5-heptenoic acid

Identifiers
CAS Number	51982-36-6
3D model (JSmol)	Interactive image
ChEBI	CHEBI:27647
ChemSpider	4444406
EC Number	200-662-2
KEGG	C05956
PubChem CID	5280883
UNII	AZ87DUD2Y8
CompTox Dashboard (EPA)	DTXSID00866229
- InChI: InChI=1S/C20H32O6/c1-2-3-6-9-15(24-23)12-13-17-16(18-14-19(17)26-25-18)10-7-4-5-8-11-20(21)22/h4,7,12-13,15-19,23H,2-3,5-6,8-11,14H2,1H3,(H,21,22)/b7-4-,13-12+/t15-,16+,17+,18-,19+/m0/s1 Key: SGUKUZOVHSFKPH-YNNPMVKQSA-N; InChI=1/C20H32O6/c1-2-3-6-9-15(24-23)12-13-17-16(18-14-19(17)26-25-18)10-7-4-5-8-11-20(21)22/h4,7,12-13,15-19,23H,2-3,5-6,8-11,14H2,1H3,(H,21,22)/b7-4-,13-12+/t15-,16+,17+,18-,19+/m0/s1 Key: SGUKUZOVHSFKPH-YNNPMVKQBO
- SMILES: CCCCC[C@@H](/C=C/[C@H]1[C@H]2C[C@@H]([C@@H]1C/C=C\CCCC(=O)O)OO2)OO

Properties
Chemical formula	C_{20}H_{32}O_{6}
Molar mass	368.470 g·mol^{−1}
- Except where otherwise noted, data are given for materials in their standard state (at 25 °C [77 °F], 100 kPa). Infobox references

Prostaglandin G_{2} (PGG_{2}) is an organic peroxide belonging to the family of prostaglandins. The compound has been isolated as a solid, although it is usually used in vivo. It quickly converts into prostaglandin H_{2}, a process catalyzed by the enzyme cyclooxygenase (COX).

Prostaglandin G_{2} is produced from the fatty acid arachidonic acid. The reaction, a double oxygenation, requires the enzyme COX, which inserts two molecules of O_{2} into the C-H bonds of the substrate acid.
