= Hepoxilin-epoxide hydrolase =

Class of enzymes

Identifiers
- EC no.: 3.3.2.7
- CAS no.: 122096-98-4

Databases
- BRENDA: enzyme data
- ExPASy: NiceZyme view
- KEGG: enzyme entry
- MetaCyc: metabolic pathway
- Rhea: reactions
- PDB structures: RCSB PDB PDBe PDBsum
- Gene Ontology: AmiGO / QuickGO
Search
- PMC: articles
- PubMed: articles
- NCBI: proteins

Hepoxilin-epoxide hydrolase (EC 3.3.2.7) is an enzyme that catalyzes the conversion of the epoxyalcohol metabolites arachidonic acid, hepoxilin A3 and hepoxilin B3 to their tri-hydroxyl products, trioxolin A3 and trioxilin B3, respectively. These reactions in general inactivate the two biologically active hepoxilins.

== Enzyme activity ==
Hepoxilin-epoxide hydrolase converts the epoxide residue in hepoxilins A3 and B3 to vicinal (chemistry) diols as exemplified in the following enzyme reaction for the metabolism of hepoxilin A3 to trioxilin A3:

hepoxilin A3
H_{2}O
trioxilin A3

The substrates of this enzyme are 8-hydroxy-11S,12S-epoxy-(5Z,9E,14Z)-eicosatrienoic acid, i.e. hepoxilin A3 and water. Its product is 8,11,12-trihydroxy-(5Z,9E,14Z)-eicosatrienoic acid, i.e. the triol, trioxilin A3.

== Epoxide hydrolases ==
Epoxide hydrolases represent a group of enzymes that convert various types of epoxides to vicinal diols. Several members of this group have this metabolic activity on fatty acid epoxides including microsomal epoxide hydrolase (i.e. epoxide hydrolase 1 or EH1), soluble epoxide hydrolase (i.e. epoxide hydrolase 2 or EH2), epoxide hydrolase 3 (EH3), epoxide hydrolase 4 (EH4), and leukotriene A4 hydrolase (see epoxide hydrolase). The systematic name of this enzyme class is (5Z,9E,14Z)-(8xi,11R,12S)-11,12-epoxy-8-hydroxyicosa-5,9,14-trienoat e hydrolase. Other names in common use include hepoxilin epoxide hydrolase, hepoxylin hydrolase, and hepoxilin A3 hydrolase. Since the hepoxilins are metabolites of arachidonic acid, hepoxilin-epoxide hydrolase participates in arachidonic acid metabolism.

== Identity of hepoxilin-epoxide hydrolase ==
Studies have shown that soluble epoxide hydrolase (i.e. epoxide hydrolase 2 or EH2) readily metabolizes a) hepoxilin A3 to trioxilin A3 and b) hepoxilin B3 (10-hydroxy-11S,12S-epoxy-(5Z,9E,14Z)-eicosatrienoic acid) to trioxilin B3 (10,11,12-trihydroxy-(5Z,9E,14Z)-eicosatrienoic acid. Soluble epoxide hydrolase (i.e. epoxide hydrolase 2 or EH2) sEH also appears to be the hepoxilin hydrolase that is responsible for inactivating the epoxyalcohol metabolites of arachidonic acid, hepoxilin A3 and hepoxiin B3. Soluble epoxide hydrolase is widely expressed in a diversity of human and other mammal tissues and therefore appears to be the hepoxilin hydrolase responsible for inactivating hepoxilin A3 and B3 (see soluble epoxide hydrolase#Function and epoxide hydrolase#Hepoxilin-epoxide hydrolase). The ability of EH1, EH3, EH4, and leukotriene A4 hydrolase to metabolize hepoxilins to trioxilins has not yet been reported.

== Function ==
Hepoxilins possess several activities (see hepoxilin#Physiological effects) whereas their trioxilin products are generally considered to be inactive. Accordingly, the soluble epoxide hydrolase metabolic pathway is considered to function in vivo to inactivate or limit the activity of the hepoxilins. The other fatty acid epoxide hydrolases cited in the epoxide hydrolases section (above) have not be reported for hepoxilin-epoxide hydrolase activity, could possibly exhibit this, and therefore contribute to inactivating the hepoxilins.
