= Epoxide hydrolase =

Enzyme that metabolizes compounds containing epoxides

microsomal epoxide hydrolase

Identifiers
- EC no.: 3.3.2.9
- CAS no.: 9048-63-9

Databases
- BRENDA: enzyme data
- ExPASy: NiceZyme view
- KEGG: enzyme entry
- MetaCyc: metabolic pathway
- Rhea: reactions
- PDB structures: RCSB PDB PDBe PDBsum
- Gene Ontology: AmiGO / QuickGO
Search
- PMC: articles
- PubMed: articles
- NCBI: proteins

soluble epoxide hydrolase
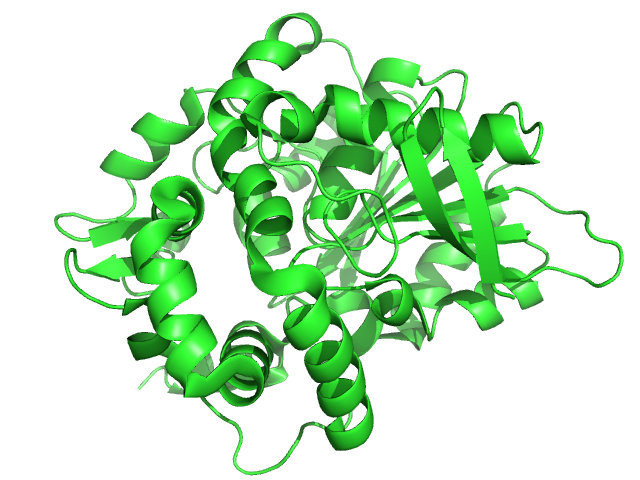
- Epoxide hydrolase from Mycobacterium tuberculosis.

Identifiers
- EC no.: 3.3.2.10
- CAS no.: 9048-63-9

Databases
- BRENDA: enzyme data
- ExPASy: NiceZyme view
- KEGG: enzyme entry
- MetaCyc: metabolic pathway
- Rhea: reactions
- PDB structures: RCSB PDB PDBe PDBsum
- Gene Ontology: AmiGO / QuickGO
Search
- PMC: articles
- PubMed: articles
- NCBI: proteins

Epoxide hydrolases (EHs), also known as epoxide hydratases, are enzymes that metabolize compounds that contain an epoxide residue; they convert this residue to two hydroxyl residues through an epoxide hydrolysis reaction to form diol products. Several enzymes possess EH activity. Microsomal epoxide hydrolase (epoxide hydrolase 1, EH1, or mEH), soluble epoxide hydrolase (sEH, epoxide hydrolase 2, EH2, or cytoplasmic epoxide hydrolase), and the more recently discovered but not as yet well defined functionally, epoxide hydrolase 3 (EH3) and epoxide hydrolase 4 (EH4) are structurally closely related isozymes. Other enzymes with epoxide hydrolase activity include leukotriene A4 hydrolase, Cholesterol-5,6-oxide hydrolase, MEST (gene) (Peg1/MEST), and Hepoxilin-epoxide hydrolase. The hydrolases are distinguished from each other by their substrate preferences and, directly related to this, their functions.

== Classification ==
=== mEH (EH1), sEH (EH2), EH3, and EH4 isozymes ===
Humans express four epoxide hydrolase isozymes: mEH, sEH, EH3, and EH4. These isozymes are known (mEH and sEH) or presumed (EH3 and EH4) to share a common structure that includes containing an Alpha/beta hydrolase fold and a common reaction mechanism wherein they add water to epoxides to form vicinal cis (see (cis-trans isomerism); see (epoxide#Olefin (alkene) oxidation using organic peroxides and metal catalysts)) diol products. They differ, however, in subcellular location, substrate preferences, tissue expression, and/or function.

epoxide hydrolase 1, microsomal

Identifiers
- Symbol: EPHX1
- NCBI gene: 2052
- HGNC: 3401
- OMIM: 132810
- RefSeq: NM_000120
- UniProt: Q9NQV0

Other data
- EC number: 3.3.2.9
- Locus: Chr. 1 q42.1
Search for
- Structures: Swiss-model
- Domains: InterPro

epoxide hydrolase 2, cytoplasmic

Identifiers
- Symbol: EPHX2
- NCBI gene: 2053
- HGNC: 3402
- OMIM: 132811
- RefSeq: NM_001979
- UniProt: P34913

Other data
- EC number: 3.3.2.10
- Locus: Chr. 8 p21
Search for
- Structures: Swiss-model
- Domains: InterPro

epoxide hydrolase 3

Identifiers
- Symbol: EPHX3
- Alt. symbols: ABHD9
- NCBI gene: 79852
- HGNC: 23760
- RefSeq: NM_024794
- UniProt: Q9H6B9

Other data
- EC number: 3.3.-.-
- Locus: Chr. 19 p13.13
Search for
- Structures: Swiss-model
- Domains: InterPro

epoxide hydrolase 4

Identifiers
- Symbol: EPHX4
- Alt. symbols: ABHD7
- NCBI gene: 253152
- HGNC: 23758
- RefSeq: NM_173567
- UniProt: Q8IUS5

Other data
- EC number: 3.3.-.-
- Locus: Chr. 1 p22.1
Search for
- Structures: Swiss-model
- Domains: InterPro

==== mEH ====
mEH is widely expressed in virtually all mammalian cells as an endoplasmic reticulum-bound (i.e. microsomal-bound) enzyme with its C terminal catalytic domain facing the cytoplasm; in some tissues, however, mEH has been found bound to the cell surface plasma membrane with its catalytic domain facing the extracellular space. The primary function of mEH is to convert potentially toxic xenobiotics and other compounds that possess epoxide residues (which is often due to their initial metabolism by cytochrome P450 enzymes to epoxides) to diols. Epoxides are highly reactive electrophilic compounds that form adducts with DNA and proteins and also cause strand breaks in DHA; in consequence, epoxides can cause gene mutations, cancer, and the inactivation of critical proteins. The diols thereby formed are more soluble, usually not toxic or far less toxic than their epoxide predecessors, are readily further metabolized, and ultimately excreted in the urine. mEH also metabolizes certain epoxides of polyunsaturated fatty acids such as the epoxyeicosatrienoic acids (EETs) but its activity in doing this is far less than that of sEH; mEH therefore may play a minor role, compared to sEH, in limiting the bioactivity of these cell signaling compounds (see microsomal epoxide hydrolase).

==== sEH ====
sEH is widely expressed in mammalian cells as a cytosolic enzyme where it primarily serves the function of converting epoxyeicosatrienoic acids (EETs), epoxyeicosatetraenoic acids (EQAs), and epoxydocosapentaenoic acids (DPAs) to their corresponding diols, thereby limiting or ending their cell signaling actions; in this capacity, sEH appears to play a critical in vivo role in limiting the effects of these epoxides in animal models and possibly humans. However, sEH also metabolizes the epoxides of linoleic acid viz., Vernolic acid (leukotoxin) and Coronaric acids (isoleukotoxin) to their corresponding diols which are highly toxic in animal models and possibly humans (see Vernolic acid#Toxicity, Coronaric acid#toxicity, and soluble epoxide hydrolase). sEH also possesses hepoxilin-epoxide hydrolase activity, converting bioactive hepoxilins to their inactive trioxilin products (see below section "Hepoxilin-epoxide hydrolase").

==== EH3 ====
Human EH3 is a recently characterized protein with epoxy hydrolase activity for metabolizing epoxyeicosatrienoic acids (EETs) and vernolic acids (leukotoxins) to their corresponding diols; in these capacities they may thereby limit the cell signaling activity of the EETs and contribute to the toxicity of the leukotoxins. mRNA for EH3 is most strongly expressed in the lung, skin, and upper gastrointestinal tract tissues of mice. The function of EH3 in humans, mice, or other mammals has not yet been determined although the gene for EH3 has been validated as being hypermethylated on CpG sites in its promoter region in human prostate cancer tissue, particularly in the tissues of more advanced or morphologically-based (i.e. Gleason score) more aggressive cancers; this suggests that the gene silencing of EH3 due to this hypermethylation may contribute to the onset and/or progression of prostate cancer. Similar CpG site hypermethylations in the promoter of for the EH3 gene have been validated for other cancers. This promoter methylation pattern, although not yet validated, was also found in human melanoma.

==== EH4 ====
The gene for EH4, EPHX4, is projected to encode an epoxide hydrolase closely related in amino acid sequence and structure to mEH, sEH, and EH3. The activity and function of EH4 has not yet been defined.

=== Other epoxy hydrolases ===
==== Leukotriene A4 hydrolase ====
Leukotriene A4 hydrolase (LTA4H) acts primarily, if not exclusively, to hydrolyze leukotriene A4 (LTA4, i.e. 5S,6S-oxido-7E,9E,11Z,14Z-eicosatetetraenoic acid; IUPAC name 4-{(2S,3S)-3-[(1E,3E,5Z,8Z)-1,3,5,8-Tetradecatetraen-1-yl]-2-oxiranyl}butanoic acid) to its diol metabolite, leukotriene B4 (LTB4, i.e. 5S,12R-dihydroxy-6Z,8E,10E,14Z-eicosatetraenoic acid; IUPAC name 5S,6Z,8E,10E,12R,14Z)-5,12-Dihydroxy-6,8,10,14-eicosatetraenoic acid). LTB4 is an important recruiter and activator of leukocytes involved in mediation in inflammatory responses and diseases. The enzyme also possess aminopeptidase activity, degrading, for example, the leukocyte chemotactic factor tripeptide, Pro-Gly-Pro (PGP); the function of the aminopeptidase activity of LTA4AH is unknown but has been proposed to be involved in limiting inflammatory reactions caused by this or other aminopeptidase-susceptible peptides.

==== Cholesterol-5,6-oxide hydrolase ====
(Cholesterol epoxide hydrolase or ChEH), is located in the endoplasmic reticulum and to a lesser extent plasma membrane of various cell types but most highly expressed in liver. The enzyme catalyzes the conversion of certain 3-hydroxyl-5,6-epoxides of cholesterol to their 3,5,6-trihydroxy products (see Cholesterol-5,6-oxide hydrolase). The function of ChEH is unknown.

==== Peg1/MEST ====
The substrates and physiological function of Peg1/MEST are not known; however, the protein may play a role in mammalian development and abnormalities in its expression by its gene (PEG1/MEST)by, for example, loss of Genomic imprinting, overexpression, or promoter switching, has been linked to certain types of cancer and tumors in humans such as invasive cervical cancer, uterine leiomyomas, and cancers of the breast, lung, and colon (see MEST (gene)).

==== Hepoxilin-epoxide hydrolase ====
Hepoxilin-epoxide hydrolase or hepoxilin hydrolase is currently best defined as an enzyme activity that converts the biologically active monohydroxy-epoxide metabolites of arachidonic acid hepoxilin A3s and hepoxilin B3s to essentially inactive trihydroxy products, the trioxilins. That is, hepoxilin A3s (8-hydroxy-11,12-oxido-5Z,9E,14Z-eicosatrienoic acid) are metabolized to trioxilin A3s (8,11,12-trihydroxy-5Z,9E,14Z-eicosatrienoic acids) and hepoxilins B3s (10-hydroxy-11,12-oxido-5Z,8Z,14Z-eicosatrienoic acids) are metabolized to trioxilin B3s (10,11,12-trihydroxy-5Z,8Z,14Z-eicosatrienoic acids). However, this activity has not been characterized at the purified protein or gene level and recent work indicate that sEH readily metabolizes an hepoxilin A3 to a trioxilin A3 and that hepoxilin-epoxide hydrolase activity is due to sEH, at least as it is detected in mouse liver.

==== Mycobacterium tuberculosis ====
Mycobacterium tuberculosis, the causative agent of tuberculosis, expresses at least six different forms of epoxide hydrolase (forms A-F). The structure of epoxide hydrolase B reveals that the enzyme is a monomer and contains an alpha/beta hydrolase fold. In addition to providing insights into the enzyme mechanism, this hydrolase currently serves as a platform for rational drug design of potent inhibitors. In particular, urea based inhibitors have been developed. These inhibitors directly target the catalytic cavity. It is hypothesized that the structure of epoxide hydrolase B may allow for drug design to inhibit all other Mycobacterium tuberculosis hydrolases as long as they contain similar alpha/beta folds. The structure of hydrolase B contains a cap domain, which is hypothesized to regulate the active site of the hydrolase. Furthermore, Asp104, His333, and Asp302 form the catalytic triad of the protein and is critical to function of the protein. At present, other structures of Mycobacterium tuberculosis hydrolase have not been solved. Model studies on pharmacological susceptibility of these epoxide hydrolases continue.
