= Epoxide hydrase =

Epoxide hydrase may refer to:

- Microsomal epoxide hydrolase
- Soluble epoxide hydrolase
- Epoxide hydrolase
