= SEH =

SEH or Seh may refer to:

== Science and technology ==
- Lipid-phosphate phosphatase, an enzyme
- Soluble epoxide hydrolase, an enzyme which catalyzes the addition of water to epoxides
- Spinal extradural haematoma
- Structured Exception Handling, a computing concept designed to handle the occurrence of program exceptions

== Transportation ==
- Shoreham railway station, Kent, England (National Rail station code SEH)
- Sky Express (Greece) (ICAO airline code SEH)
- South German Railway Museum, (German: Süddeutsches Eisenbahnmuseum Heilbronn), Germany
- Senggeh Airport (IATA airport code), Indonesia; see List of airports by IATA code

== Other uses ==
- St Edmund Hall, Oxford, England
- Shin-Etsu Handotai, a semiconductor wafer manufacturer for the integrated circuit industry; see Soitec
- Seh, a village in Iran
