= CTDNEP1 =

Protein-coding gene in the species Homo sapiens

Identifiers
- Aliases: CTDNEP1, DULLARD, HSA011916, NET56, CTD nuclear envelope phosphatase 1
- External IDs: OMIM: 610684; MGI: 1914431; GeneCards: CTDNEP1
Enzyme activity
| EC # | BRENDA | ExPASy | KEGG | MetaCyc |
|---|---|---|---|---|
| 3.1.3.16 | ↗ | ↗ | ↗ | ↗ |

Gene location (Mouse)
| Chr. | Chromosome 11 (mouse) |
| Band | 11|11 B3 | Start | 69,871,982 bp |
| Band | 11|11 B3 | End | 69,881,427 bp |
RNA expression pattern
| Bgee | Human / Mouse (ortholog); Top expressed in: gastrocnemius muscle; skeletal muscle tissue; ganglionic eminence; stromal cell of endometrium; skin of abdomen; canal of the cervix; spleen; smooth muscle tissue; lymph node; fallopian tube / Top expressed in: muscle of thigh; lip; dentate gyrus of hippocampal formation granule cell; skeletal muscle tissue; tail of embryo; ventricular zone; ankle; genital tubercle; superior frontal gyrus; upper arm; More reference expression data |
| BioGPS | n/a |
Gene ontology
| Molecular function | phosphoprotein phosphatase activity; phosphatase activity; protein serine/threonine phosphatase activity; protein binding; hydrolase activity |
| Cellular component | cytoplasm; integral component of membrane; nuclear membrane; nuclear envelope; endoplasmic reticulum membrane; membrane; Nem1-Spo7 phosphatase complex; endoplasmic reticulum; nucleus; lipid droplet |
| Biological process | positive regulation of triglyceride biosynthetic process; nuclear envelope organization; positive regulation of canonical Wnt signaling pathway; protein dephosphorylation; gamete generation; mitotic nuclear membrane disassembly; protein localization to nucleus; mesoderm development; dephosphorylation |
Sources:Amigo / QuickGO
Orthologs
| Databases | NCBI: entry |
| Species | Human | Mouse |
| Entrez | 23399 | 67181 |
| Ensembl | n/a | ENSMUSG00000018559 |
| UniProt | O95476 | Q3TP92 |
| RefSeq (mRNA) | NM_015343; NM_001143775 | NM_026017 |
| RefSeq (protein) | NP_001137247; NP_056158 | NP_080293 |
| Location (UCSC) | n/a | Chr 11: 69.87 – 69.88 Mb |
| PubMed search |
- Wikidata
| View/Edit Human | View/Edit Mouse |

In cell biology, CTDNEP1 (CTD nuclear envelope phosphatase 1) is a protein coding gene involved in neural development. It is a member of DXDX(T/V) phosphatase family and is a potential regulator of neural tube development in Xenopus. The gene promotes neural development by inhibiting bone morphogenetic proteins (BMPs). The encoded protein is relatively small and only contains 244 amino acids.

== Description ==
CTDnep1, which stands for CTD nuclear envelope phosphatase 1. It is a protein coding gene, which include phosphatase activity and protein serine/threonine phosphatase activity. CTDnep1 encodes a protein serine/threonine phosphatase and dephosphorylates LPIN1 and LPIN2. LPIN1 and LPIN2 catalyze the reaction of the conversion of phosphatidic acid to diacylglycerol. The reaction can affect and change the lipid concentration of the endoplasmic reticulum and the nucleus.

== Dullard and BNP signaling ==
Neural development happens in the dorsal ectoderm. In the genus Xenopus, over expression of CTDNEP1 undergoes apoptosis in early development. CTDNEP1 helps promote Ubiquitin by proteosomal degradation. CTDNEP1 mRNA is derived from maternal genes and is localized within the animal neural hemisphere. Functioning negatively for the regulation of Bone Morphogenetic Proteins (BMPs), CTDNEP1 conserves the C-terminal region of NLI-IF, in which is fairly dominant in cellular functions. CTDNEP1 is essential for inhibiting BMP receptor activation during Xenopus neuralization.

== Human Dullard ==
Human CTDNEP1 has shown that the protein has two membrane spanning regions. One end is the N-terminal end, which helps localize the protein to the nuclear envelope. CTDNEP1 dephosphorylates the mammalian phosphatidic acid phosphatase, lipin. CTDNEP1 participates in a unique phosphatase cascade regulating nuclear membrane biogenesis, and that this cascade is conserved from yeast to mammals. There is belief that CTDNEP1 may have other targets that is not only associated with the nuclear envelope. In recent studies, CTDNEP1 interacts with BMP type 1 to inhibit dependent phosphorylation. This can conclude that it is a potential source for regulating the level of BMP signaling and can affect germ cell specification.

CTD nuclear envelope phosphatase 1 is a protein in humans that is encoded by the CTDNEP1 gene.
