= Medulloblastoma =

Most common type of primary brain cancer in children

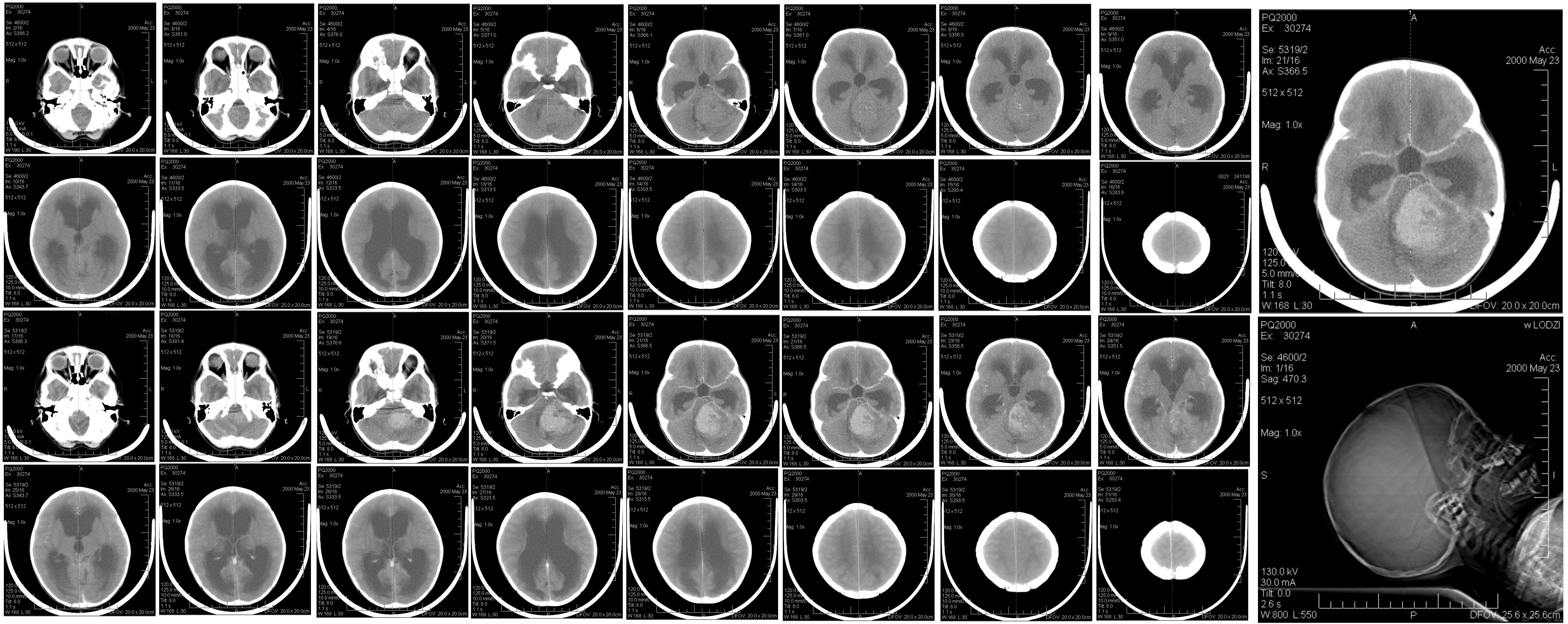
- CT scan, showing a tumorous mass in the posterior fossa, giving rise to obstructive hydrocephalus, in a six-year-old girl
- Pronunciation: /məˌdʌloʊblæˈstoʊmə/
- Specialty: Neuro-oncology, neurosurgery
- Symptoms: Headaches; Nausea; Vomiting; Tiredness; Clumsiness; Dizziness; Change in vision Handwriting problems
- Usual onset: Between 5 and 9 years old
- Prognosis: Five-year survival rate: 72.1%
- Frequency: About 500 children diagnosed annually in the United States

Medulloblastoma is a common type of primary brain cancer in children. It originates in the part of the brain that is towards the back and the bottom, on the floor of the skull, in the cerebellum, or posterior fossa.

The brain is divided into two main parts, the larger cerebrum on top and the smaller cerebellum below towards the back. They are separated by a membrane called the tentorium. Tumors that originate in the cerebellum or the surrounding region below the tentorium are, therefore, called infratentorial.

Historically, medulloblastomas have been classified as a primitive neuroectodermal tumor (PNET), but it is now known that medulloblastoma is distinct from supratentorial PNETs and they are no longer considered similar entities.

Medulloblastomas are invasive, rapidly growing tumors that, unlike most brain tumors, spread through the cerebrospinal fluid and frequently metastasize to different locations along the surface of the brain and spinal cord. Metastasis all the way down to the cauda equina at the base of the spinal cord is termed "drop metastasis".

The cumulative relative survival rate for all age groups and histology follow-up was 60%, 52%, and 47% at 5 years, 10 years, and 20 years, respectively, with children doing better than adults.

== Signs and symptoms ==
Signs and symptoms are mainly due to secondary increased intracranial pressure due to blockage of the fourth ventricle and tumors are usually present for 1 to 5 months before diagnosis is made. The child typically becomes listless, with repeated episodes of vomiting, and a morning headache, which might lead to a misdiagnosis of gastrointestinal disease or migraine. Soon after, the child will develop a stumbling gait, truncal ataxia, frequent falls, diplopia, papilledema, and sixth cranial nerve palsy. Positional vertigo and nystagmus are also frequent, and facial sensory loss or motor weakness may be present. Decerebrate attacks appear late in the disease.

Extraneural metastasis to the rest of the body is rare, and when it occurs, it is in the setting of relapse, more commonly in the era prior to routine chemotherapy.

== Pathogenesis ==
Medulloblastomas are usually found in the vicinity of the fourth ventricle, between the brainstem and the cerebellum. Tumors with similar appearance and characteristics originate in other parts of the brain, but they are not identical to medulloblastoma.

Although medulloblastomas are thought to originate from immature or embryonal cells at their earliest stage of development, the cell of origin depends on the subgroup of medulloblastoma. WNT tumors originate from the lower rhombic lip of the brainstem, while SHH tumors originate from the external granular layer.

Currently, medulloblastomas are thought to arise from cerebellar stem cells that have been prevented from dividing and differentiating into their normal cell types. This accounts for the histologic variants seen on biopsy. Both perivascular pseudorosette and Homer Wright pseudorosette formations are highly characteristic of medulloblastomas and are seen in up to half of cases. The classic rosette with tumor cells around a central lumen can be seen.

In the past, medulloblastoma was classified using histology, but integrated genomic studies have revealed that medulloblastoma (MB) is composed of four distinct molecular and clinical variants termed WNT/β-catenin, Sonic Hedgehog, Group 3, and Group 4. Of these subgroups, WNT patients have an excellent prognosis and group 3 patients have a poor prognosis. The WNT subgroup makes up about 10% of all MB cases and it originates from pontine mossy fiber neurons from the embryonic lower rhombic lip of the dorsal hindbrain. The SHH subgroup makes up 25% of all MB cases and it has a good prognosis if is does not contain a MYCN amplification or TP53 mutation which can greatly worsen its prognosis. This subgroup originates from granule neuron precursors (GNP) and nestin-expressing progenitors in the external granular layer. Group 3 and 4 have more complicated molecular features as there is no unified activated pathway, these subgroups are therefore clustered based on their transcriptional profile and genomic methylation pattern. Group 3 is the most aggressive subgroup with high metastatic potential and poor overall survival, it makes up about 25% of all MB cases. Group 4 is the largest subgroup making up about 40% of all MB cases. Group 4 originate from both unipolar brush cells and GNP lineage, it is likely that they come from bipotential progenitor cells. Group 3 clusters more towards the GNPs and has stem-like properties.

Subgroup-specific alternative splicing further confirms the existence of these distinct subgroups and highlights the transcriptional heterogeneity between subgroups. Amplification of the Sonic Hedgehog pathway is the best characterized subgroup, with 25% of human tumors having mutations in Patched, Sufu (Suppressor of Fused Homolog), Smoothened, or other genes in this pathway. In the WNT subgroup the WNT pathway activating gene CTNNB1 is mutated in 86% of the cases, this mutation promotes the stabilization and nuclear localization of β-catenin. If this mutation is absent other WNT activating mutations are always present for example the APC gene.

Medulloblastomas are also seen in Gorlin syndrome as well as Turcot syndrome. Recurrent mutations in the genes CTNNB1, PTCH1, MLL2, SMARCA4, DDX3X, CTDNEP1, KDM6A, and TBR1 were identified in individuals with medulloblastoma.Additional pathways disrupted in some medulloblastomas include MYC, Notch, BMP, and TGF-β signaling pathways.

== Diagnosis ==
The tumor is distinctive on T1- and T2-weighted MRI with heterogeneous enhancement and a typical location adjacent to and extension into the fourth ventricle. Histologically, the tumor is solid, pink-gray in color, and is well circumscribed. The tumor is very cellular, with high mitotic activity, little cytoplasm, and a tendency to form clusters and rosettes.

The Chang staging system can be used in making the diagnosis.

DNA methylation profiling of medulloblastoma allows robust sub-classification and improved outcome prediction using formalin-fixed biopsies.

Correct diagnosis of medulloblastoma may require ruling out atypical teratoid rhabdoid tumor.

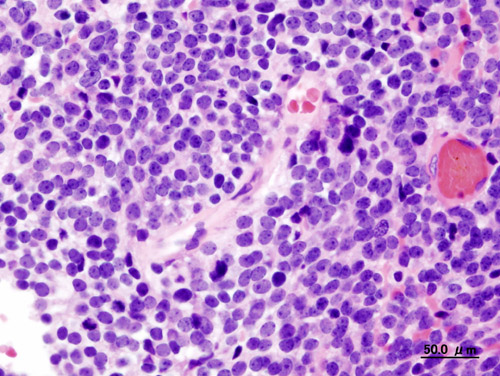
Cerebellar medulloblastoma in an adult

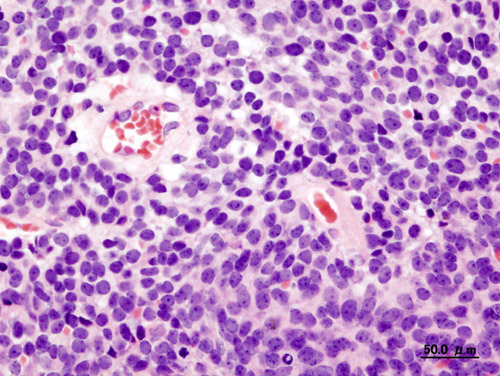
Cerebellar medulloblastoma in an adult

== Treatment ==
Treatment begins with maximal surgical removal of the tumor. The addition of radiation to the entire neuraxis and chemotherapy may increase the disease-free survival. This combination may permit a 5-year survival in more than 80% of cases. Some evidence indicates that proton beam irradiation reduces the impact of radiation on the cochlear and cardiovascular areas and reduces the cognitive late effects of cranial irradiation.

The presence of desmoplastic features such as connective tissue formation offers a better prognosis. Prognosis is worse if the child is less than 3 years old, degree of resection is inadequate, or if any CSF, spinal, supratentorial, or systemic spread occurs. Dementia after radiotherapy and chemotherapy is a common outcome appearing two to four years following treatment. Side effects from radiation treatment can include cognitive impairment, psychiatric illness, bone growth retardation, hearing loss, and endocrine disruption. Increased intracranial pressure may be controlled with corticosteroids or a ventriculoperitoneal shunt. An approach to monitor tumor development and treatment response by liquid biopsy is promising, but remains challenging.

=== Chemotherapy ===
Chemotherapy is often used as part of treatment. Evidence of benefit, however, is not clear as of 2013. A few different chemotherapeutic regimens for medulloblastoma are used; most involve a combination of lomustine, cisplatin, carboplatin, vincristine, or cyclophosphamide. In younger patients (less than 3–4 years of age), chemotherapy can delay, or in some cases possibly even eliminate, the need for radiotherapy. However, both chemotherapy and radiotherapy often have long-term toxicity effects, including delays in physical and cognitive development, higher risk of second cancers, and increased cardiac disease risks.

== Outcomes ==
Array-based karyotyping of 260 medulloblastomas resulted in the following clinical subgroups based on cytogenetic profiles:

- Poor prognosis: gain of 6q or amplification of MYC or MYCN
- Intermediate: gain of 17q or an i(17q) without gain of 6q or amplification of MYC or MYCN
- Excellent prognosis: 6q and 17q balanced or 6q deletion

Transcriptional profiling shows the existence of four main subgroups (Wnt, Shh, Group 3, and Group 4).

- Very good prognosis: WNT group, CTNNB1 mutation
- Infants good prognosis, others intermediate: SHH group, PTCH1/SMO/SUFU mutation, GLI2 amplification, or MYCN amplification
- Poor prognosis: Group 3, MYC amplification, photoreceptor/GABAergic gene expression
- Intermediate prognosis: Group 4, gene expression of neuronal/glutamatergic, CDK6 amplification, MYCN amplification

=== Survival ===
The historical cumulative relative survival rate for all age groups and histology follow-up was 60%, 52%, and 47% at 5 years, 10 years, and 20 years, respectively. Patients diagnosed with a medulloblastoma or PNET are 50 times more likely to die than a matched member of the general population. A population-based (SEER) 5-year relative survival rates indicated 69% overall: 72% in children (1–9 years) and 67% in adults (20+ years). The 20-year survival rate is 51% in children. Children and adults have different survival profiles, with adults faring worse than children only after the fourth year after diagnosis (after controlling for increased background mortality). Before the fourth year, survival probabilities are nearly identical. Long-term sequelae of standard treatment include hypothalamic-pituitary and thyroid dysfunction and intellectual impairment. The hormonal and intellectual deficits created by these therapies causes significant impairment of the survivors.

In current clinical studies, the patients are divided into low-, standard- and high-risk groups:

- Depending on the study, healing rates of up to 100% are achieved in the low-risk group (usually WNT-activated). The current efforts are therefore moving in the direction of reducing the intensity of the therapy and thus the negative long-term consequences while confirming the high healing rates.
- In the HIT-SIOP PNET 4 study, in which 340 children and adolescents of the standard-risk group between the ages of four and 21 from several European countries participated, the 5-year survival rate was between 85% and 87% depending on the randomization. Around 78% of the patients remained without relapse for 5 years and are therefore considered to be cured. After a relapse, the prognosis was very poor. Despite intensive treatment, only four of 66 patients were still alive 5 years after a relapse.
- A US study involved 161 patients between the ages of three and 21 with a high-risk profile. Depending on the randomization, half of the patients additionally received carboplatin daily during the radiation. The 5-year survival rate of patients with carboplatin was 82%, those without 68%. The European SIOP PNET 5 study is currently taking place and will run until April 2024, in which an attempt is made to confirm the promising results with carboplatin during irradiation in the standard risk group.

== Epidemiology ==
Medulloblastomas affect just under two people per million per year, and affect children 10 times more than adults. Medulloblastoma is the second-most frequent brain tumor in children after pilocytic astrocytoma and the most common malignant brain tumor in children, comprising 14.5% of newly diagnosed brain tumors. In adults, medulloblastoma is rare, comprising fewer than 2% of CNS malignancies.

The rate of new cases of childhood medulloblastoma is higher in males (62%) than females (38%), a feature that is not seen in adults. Medulloblastoma and other PNETs are more prevalent in younger children than older children. About 40% of medulloblastoma patients are diagnosed before the age of five, 31% are between the ages of 5 and 9, 18.3% are between the ages of 10 and 14, and 12.7% are between the ages of 15 and 19.

== Research models ==
Using gene transfer of SV40 large T-antigen in neuronal precursor cells of rats, a brain tumor model was established. The PNETs were histologically indistinguishable from the human counterparts and have been used to identify new genes involved in human brain tumor carcinogenesis. The model was used to confirm p53 as one of the genes involved in human medulloblastomas, but since only about 10% of the human tumors showed mutations in that gene, the model can be used to identify the other binding partners of SV40 Large T- antigen, other than p53. In a mouse model, high medulloblastoma frequency appears to be caused by the down regulation of Cxcl3, with Cxcl3 being induced by Tis21. Consistently, the treatment with Cxcl3 completely prevents the growth of medulloblastoma lesions in a Shh-type mouse model of medulloblastoma. Thus, CXCL3 is a target for medulloblastoma therapy.
