= Epoxide hydrolase 3 =

Protein-coding gene in the species Homo sapiens

EPHX3

Identifiers
- Aliases: EPHX3, ABHD9, EH3, epoxide hydrolase 3
- External IDs: OMIM: 617400; MGI: 1919182; GeneCards: EPHX3
Enzyme activity
EC #	BRENDA	ExPASy	KEGG	MetaCyc
3.3.2.10	↗	↗	↗	↗

Gene location (Human)
Chr.	Chromosome 19 (human)
Band	19p13.12	Start	15,226,919 bp
Band	19p13.12	End	15,233,435 bp

Gene location (Mouse)
Chr.	Chromosome 17 (mouse)
Band	17|17 B1	Start	32,402,744 bp
Band	17|17 B1	End	32,408,523 bp
RNA expression pattern
Bgee	Human / Mouse (ortholog); Top expressed in: skin of abdomen; skin of leg; human penis; skin of thigh; vulva; skin of arm; epithelium of esophagus; gums; testicle; gingival epithelium / Top expressed in: esophagus; skin of abdomen; lip; skin of back; hair follicle; skin of external ear; condyle; conjunctival fornix; cornea; fossa; More reference expression data
BioGPS	n/a
Gene ontology
Molecular function	catalytic activity; hydrolase activity; epoxide hydrolase activity
Cellular component	endoplasmic reticulum; membrane; integral component of membrane; organelle membrane; intracellular membrane-bounded organelle
Biological process	epoxide metabolic process; lipid metabolism
Sources:Amigo / QuickGO
Orthologs
Databases	NCBI: entry; OMA: entry
Species	Human	Mouse
Entrez	79852	71932
Ensembl	ENSG00000105131	ENSMUSG00000037577
UniProt	Q9H6B9	Q3V1F8
RefSeq (mRNA)	NM_024794; NM_001142886	NM_001033163; NM_001347341
RefSeq (protein)	NP_001136358; NP_079070	NP_001028335; NP_001334270
Location (UCSC)	Chr 19: 15.23 – 15.23 Mb	Chr 17: 32.4 – 32.41 Mb
PubMed search
- Wikidata
View/Edit Human	View/Edit Mouse

Epoxide hydrolase 3 (ABHD9, EH3, EPHX3) is a protein that in humans is encoded by the EPHX3 gene. It is the third defined isozyme in a set of epoxide hydrolase isozymes, the epoxide hydrolases. This set includes the Microsomal epoxide hydrolase (also termed epoxide hydrolase 1, EPHX1, mEH, and EH1); the epoxide hydrolase 2 (also termed soluble epoxide hydrolase, EPHX2, sEH and EH2); and the far less well defined enzymatically, epoxide hydrolase 4 (also termed ABHD7 and EH4). All four enzyme contain an Alpha/beta hydrolase fold suggesting that they have Hydrolysis activity. EH1, EH2, and EH3 have been shown to have such activity in that they add water to epoxides of unsaturated fatty acids to form vicinal cis (see cis-trans isomerism) products; the activity of EH4 has not been reported. The former three EH's differ in subcellular location, tissue expression patterns, substrate preferences, and thereby functions. These functions include limiting the biologically actions of certain fatty acid epoxides, increasing the toxicity of other fatty acid epoxides, and contributing to the metabolism of drugs and other xenobiotics.

== History ==
EH3 was first named ABHD9 owing to its possession of a particular Protein domain, the Alpha/beta hydrolase fold or α/β hydrolase fold domain. This domain is found in more than 30 other human hydrolytic enzymes including the four epoxide hydrolases. The gene for EH3 (EPHX3) was discovered on chromosome locus 19p13.13 in sequencing the human.genome Based on its amino acid sequence, it was projected to encode a protein with an α/β hydrolase fold domain; the encoded protein was therefore dubbed ABHD9. Some 10 years later, ABHD9 was defined to possess the ability to hydrolyze certain fatty acid epoxides.

== Expression ==
Similar to mEH but unlike sEH, EH3 is membrane-bound enzyme. Based on the expression of its mRNA in mouse tissue, EH3 has a very different distribution than mEH or sEH: EH3 expression is high in skin, lung, tongue, esophagus, and stomach; intermediate in pancreas and eye, visceral fat, lymph nodes, spleen, aortic arch, and heart; low in liver, kidney, testis, ovary intestine, and brain; and very low in skeletal muscle. Its expression in human tissues has not yet been reported.

== Activity and function ==
ABHD9 first drew attention is studies that validated that its gene, EPHX3, was hypermethylated on CpG sites in its Promoter (genetics) in human prostate cancer tissues, particularly in the tissues of more advanced or, base on morphological criteria (i.e. Gleason score), more aggressive diseases. This allows that the gene silencing of EPHX3 due to promoter hypermethylation may contribute to the onset and/or progression of prostate cancer. Similar CpG site hypermethylations in the promoter of EPHX3 have been validated for colorectal adenocarcinomas. As similar promoter methylation pattern, although not yet validated, was also found in human melanoma tissues and human gastric cancer cell lines. These studies allow but certainly do not prove that the silencing of EPHX (i.e. failure to be expressed as ABHD9 protein) is involved in the development and/or progression of certain cancers in humans.

More recently, ABHD9 was characterized as possessing epoxy hydrolase activity for metabolizing epoxyeicosatrienoic acids (EETs) and epoxides of linoleic acid (i.e. vernolic acids [also termed leukotoxins] to their corresponding diols. For example, it metabolizes one particular EET (14,15-epoxy-5Z,8Z,11Z-eicosatrienoic acid) as follows:

14,15-epoxy-5Z,8Z,11Z-eicosatrienoic acid + H_{2}O → 14,15-dihydroxy-5Z,8Z,11Z-eicosatrienoic acid

In this particular reaction, the enzyme inactivates the EET and thereby may function to limit the biological activity of this as well as the other EETs upon which it acts in, for example, regulating blood pressure (see epoxyeicosatrienoic acids. In its hydrolysis one isomer of vernolic acid (12S,13R-epoxy-cis-9-octadecenoic acid)

12S,13R-epoxy-cis-9-octadecenoic acid + H_{2}O → 12S,13R-dihydroxy-9Z-octadecenoic acids

to a diol, however, the enzyme increases its toxicity in, for example, contributing to acute respiratory distress syndromes (see vernolic acid). The enzyme thereby may function to limit the cell signaling activity of the EETs yet contribute to the toxic actions of linoleic acid epoxides.

While mEH and to a lesser extent sEH metabolize drugs, foreign toxic chemicals, and certain endogenous compounds that are not simple fatty acids (see Microsomal epoxide hydrolase and epoxide hydrolase 2), the activity of EH3 on such substrates, while likely, has not yet been reported.
