= MESTIT1 =

An Error has occurred retrieving Wikidata item for infobox

In molecular biology, MEST intronic transcript 1, antisense RNA (non-protein coding), also known as MESTIT1 or PEG1-AS, is a long non-coding RNA. It is an imprinted gene, which is paternally expressed. In humans, it is found on chromosome 7q32, imprinted genes on chromosome 7 are believed to be involved in Russell-Silver syndrome (RSS). However, it is believed that MESTIT1 is unlikely to cause Russell-Silver syndrome as there is a lack of mutations in this gene in Russell-Silver syndrome patients. MESTIT1 may regulate the expression of the MEST gene.

== See also ==
- Long noncoding RNA
