= Aminopeptidase O =

Protein-coding gene in the species Homo sapiens

AOPEP

Identifiers
- Aliases: AOPEP, chromosome 9 open reading frame 3, AP-O, APO, C90RF3, ONPEP, aminopeptidase O (putative), C9orf3
- External IDs: MGI: 1919311; GeneCards: AOPEP

Gene location (Human)
Chr.	Chromosome 9 (human)
Band	9q22.32	Start	94,726,701 bp
Band	9q22.32	End	95,087,218 bp

Gene location (Mouse)
Chr.	Chromosome 13 (mouse)
Band	13|13 B3	Start	63,112,707 bp
Band	13|13 B3	End	63,473,910 bp
RNA expression pattern
Bgee	Human / Mouse (ortholog); Top expressed in: apex of heart; right coronary artery; ascending aorta; Descending thoracic aorta; body of uterus; popliteal artery; tibial arteries; left uterine tube; sural nerve; left coronary artery / Top expressed in: lip; ascending aorta; genital tubercle; right kidney; aortic valve; muscle of thigh; tail of embryo; superior frontal gyrus; interventricular septum; primary visual cortex; More reference expression data
BioGPS	n/a
Gene ontology
Molecular function	peptide binding; zinc ion binding; peptidase activity; metallopeptidase activity; hydrolase activity; metal ion binding; metalloaminopeptidase activity; aminopeptidase activity
Cellular component	cytoplasm; nucleolus; cytosol; nucleus
Biological process	proteolysis; peptide catabolic process; angiotensin maturation
Sources:Amigo / QuickGO
Orthologs
Databases	NCBI: entry; OMA: entry
Species	Human	Mouse
Entrez	84909	72061
Ensembl	ENSG00000148120	ENSMUSG00000021458
UniProt	Q8N6M6	Q8BXQ6
RefSeq (mRNA)	NM_001193329; NM_001193330; NM_001193331; NM_032823	NM_001289924; NM_001289926; NM_028079
RefSeq (protein)	NP_001180258; NP_001180260; NP_116212	NP_001276853; NP_001276855
Location (UCSC)	Chr 9: 94.73 – 95.09 Mb	Chr 13: 63.11 – 63.47 Mb
PubMed search
- Wikidata
View/Edit Human	View/Edit Mouse

Aminopeptidase O (APO), also known as C9orf3, is an enzyme which in humans is encoded by the AOPEP gene. The protein encoded by this gene is an aminopeptidase which is most closely related in sequence to leukotriene A4 hydrolase (LTA4H). APO is a member of the M1 metalloproteinase family.

== Structure ==
The C9ORF3 aminopeptidase enzyme contains the following domains:

- LTA4H-like N-terminal domain
- gluzincin aminopeptidase domain
- SH3-like motif
- ARM C-terminal domain

== Function ==
The C9ORF3 aminopeptidase cleaves the N-terminal amino acid from polypeptides and shows a strong preference for peptides in which the N-terminus is arginine and to a lesser extent asparagine. Furthermore, the activity of the enzyme is inhibited by o-phenanthroline, a metalloprotease inhibitor and by arphamenine A, a potent inhibitor of aminopeptidases such as LTA4H. Also able to cleave angiotensin III to generate angiotensin IV, a bioactive peptide of the renin–angiotensin pathway.

Due to its aminopeptidase activity this enzyme may play a role in the proteolytic processing of bioactive peptides in those tissues where it is expressed.

== Tissue distribution ==
C9ORF3 Messenger RNA has been detected in human pancreas, placenta, liver, testis, and heart. The expression in the heart suggests this enzyme may also play a role in the regulating the physiology of cardiac muscle. Several ApO isoforms are expressed predominantly in blood vessels suggesting that ApO plays a role in vascular cell biology.

== Clinical significance ==
High expression levels of C9ORF3 is positively correlated with maximal oxygen uptake (VO_{2} max) and the amount of "slow-twitch" type 1 muscle fibers.
