= Phospholipid phosphatase 1 =

Enzyme found in humans

PLPP1

Identifiers
- Aliases: PLPP1, LLP1a, LPP1, PAP-2a, PAP2, PPAP2A, phospholipid phosphatase 1
- External IDs: OMIM: 607124; MGI: 108412; GeneCards: PLPP1
Enzyme activity
EC #	BRENDA	ExPASy	KEGG	MetaCyc
3.1.3.4	↗	↗	↗	↗
3.1.3.106	↗	↗	↗	↗
3.6.1.75	↗	↗	↗	↗

Gene location (Human)
Chr.	Chromosome 5 (human)
Band	5q11.2	Start	55,424,854 bp
Band	5q11.2	End	55,534,969 bp

Gene location (Mouse)
Chr.	Chromosome 13 (mouse)
Band	13|13 D2.2	Start	112,937,326 bp
Band	13|13 D2.2	End	113,004,428 bp
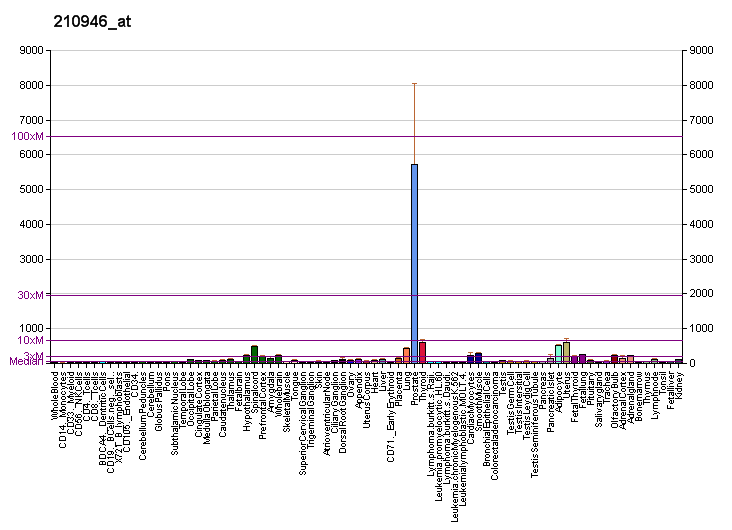

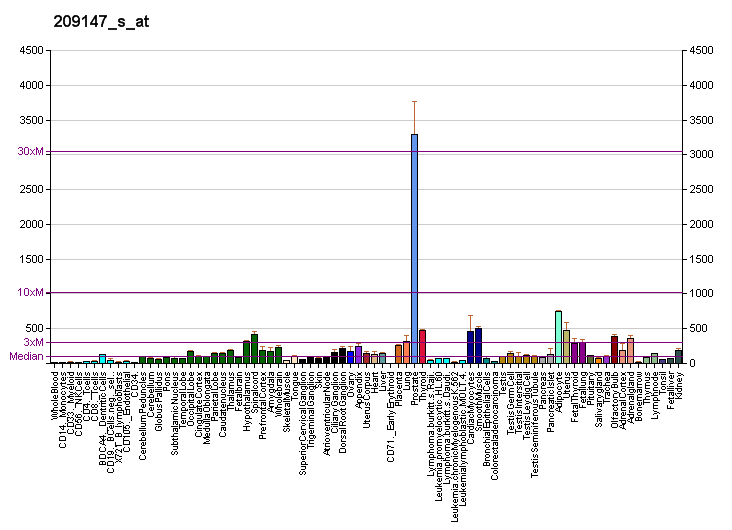
RNA expression pattern
Bgee	Human / Mouse (ortholog); Top expressed in: decidua; gallbladder; prostate; glomerulus; metanephric glomerulus; left coronary artery; right coronary artery; mucosa of urinary bladder; abdominal fat; pericardium / Top expressed in: seminal vesicula; endothelial cell of lymphatic vessel; gastrula; decidua; ankle; right lung lobe; adrenal gland; semi-lunar valve; molar; carotid body; More reference expression data
BioGPS	More reference expression data
Gene ontology
Molecular function	phosphatidate phosphatase activity; hydrolase activity; sphingosine-1-phosphate phosphatase activity; lipid phosphatase activity; phosphatase activity
Cellular component	integral component of membrane; plasma membrane; integral component of plasma membrane; extracellular exosome; membrane
Biological process	androgen receptor signaling pathway; phospholipid metabolic process; regulation of lipid metabolic process; protein dephosphorylation; protein kinase C-activating G protein-coupled receptor signaling pathway; intracellular steroid hormone receptor signaling pathway; sphingolipid biosynthetic process; germ cell migration; negative regulation of cell population proliferation; lipid metabolism; phospholipid dephosphorylation
Sources:Amigo / QuickGO
Orthologs
Databases	NCBI: entry; OMA: entry
Species	Human	Mouse
Entrez	8611	19012
Ensembl	ENSG00000067113	ENSMUSG00000021759
UniProt	O14494	Q61469
RefSeq (mRNA)	NM_003711; NM_176895	NM_008247; NM_008903
RefSeq (protein)	NP_003702; NP_795714	NP_032273; NP_032929
Location (UCSC)	Chr 5: 55.42 – 55.53 Mb	Chr 13: 112.94 – 113 Mb
PubMed search
- Wikidata
View/Edit Human	View/Edit Mouse

Phospholipid phosphatase 1 is an enzyme that in humans is encoded by the PLPP1 gene (previously PPAP2A).

== Function ==
Phospholipid phosphatase 1 is a member of the phosphatidic acid phosphatase (PAP) family. PAPs convert phosphatidic acid to diacylglycerol, and function in de novo synthesis of glycerolipids as well as in receptor-activated signal transduction mediated by phospholipase D. This protein is an integral membrane glycoprotein, and has been shown to be a surface enzyme that plays an active role in the hydrolysis and uptake of lipids from extracellular space. The expression of this gene is found to be regulated by androgen in a prostatic adenocarcinoma cell line. At least two alternatively spliced transcript variants encoding distinct isoforms have been described.
