= Phospholipid phosphatase 4 =

Enzyme found in humans

PLPP4

Identifiers
- Aliases: PLPP4, DPPL2, PPAPDC1, PPAPDC1A, phospholipid phosphatase 4
- External IDs: MGI: 2685936; GeneCards: PLPP4
Enzyme activity
EC #	BRENDA	ExPASy	KEGG	MetaCyc
3.1.3.4	↗	↗	↗	↗
3.6.1.75	↗	↗	↗	↗

Gene location (Human)
Chr.	Chromosome 10 (human)
Band	10q26.12	Start	120,457,227 bp
Band	10q26.12	End	120,592,065 bp

Gene location (Mouse)
Chr.	Chromosome 7 (mouse)
Band	7|7 F3	Start	128,858,755 bp
Band	7|7 F3	End	128,993,136 bp
RNA expression pattern
Bgee	Human / Mouse (ortholog); Top expressed in: oocyte; secondary oocyte; hypothalamus; hippocampus proper; substantia nigra; C1 segment; amygdala; pons; stromal cell of endometrium; putamen / Top expressed in: olfactory bulb; hypothalamus; embryo; embryo; dentate gyrus of hippocampal formation granule cell; mesencephalon; cerebellum; cerebellar cortex; striatum of neuraxis; primary visual cortex; More reference expression data
BioGPS	n/a
Gene ontology
Molecular function	hydrolase activity; phosphatidate phosphatase activity; identical protein binding; phosphatase activity
Cellular component	integral component of membrane; plasma membrane; integral component of plasma membrane; membrane
Biological process	phospholipid metabolic process; phospholipid dephosphorylation; Fc-gamma receptor signaling pathway involved in phagocytosis; signal transduction; blastocyst hatching
Sources:Amigo / QuickGO
Orthologs
Databases	NCBI: entry; OMA: entry
Species	Human	Mouse
Entrez	196051	381925
Ensembl	ENSG00000203805	ENSMUSG00000070366
UniProt	Q5VZY2	Q0VBU9
RefSeq (mRNA)	NM_001030059; NM_001318166; NM_001318167; NM_001318168; NM_001318169	NM_001080963
RefSeq (protein)	NP_001025230; NP_001305095; NP_001305096; NP_001305097; NP_001305098	NP_001074432
Location (UCSC)	Chr 10: 120.46 – 120.59 Mb	Chr 7: 128.86 – 128.99 Mb
PubMed search
- Wikidata
View/Edit Human	View/Edit Mouse

Phospholipid phosphatase 4 is an enzyme that in humans is encoded by the PLPP4 gene (previously PPAPDC1A). PLPP4 has phosphatidate phosphatase activity.
