= EPHX1 =

Protein-coding gene in humans

Identifiers
- Aliases: EPHX1, EPHX, EPOX, HYL1, MEH, epoxide hydrolase 1
- External IDs: OMIM: 132810; MGI: 95405; GeneCards: EPHX1
Enzyme activity
EC #	BRENDA	ExPASy	KEGG	MetaCyc
3.3.2.9	↗	↗	↗	↗

Gene location (Human)
Chr.	Chromosome 1 (human)
Band	1q42.12	Start	225,810,092 bp
Band	1q42.12	End	225,845,563 bp

Gene location (Mouse)
Chr.	Chromosome 1 (mouse)
Band	1 H4|1 84.48 cM	Start	180,803,775 bp
Band	1 H4|1 84.48 cM	End	180,848,469 bp
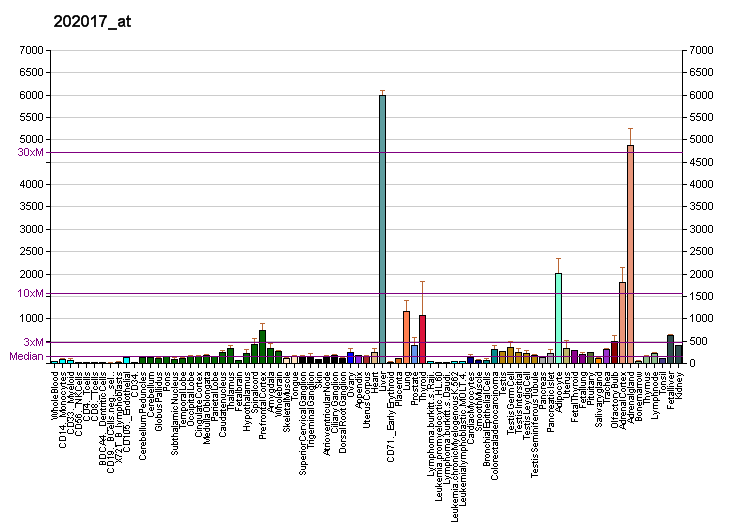
RNA expression pattern
Bgee	Human / Mouse (ortholog); Top expressed in: right adrenal cortex; left adrenal gland; left adrenal cortex; right lobe of liver; left ovary; right ovary; olfactory zone of nasal mucosa; right uterine tube; bronchial epithelial cell; nasal epithelium / Top expressed in: choroid plexus of fourth ventricle; left lobe of liver; stroma of bone marrow; nasal epithelium; olfactory epithelium; Epithelium of choroid plexus; vestibular membrane of cochlear duct; right lung lobe; iris; adrenal gland; More reference expression data
BioGPS	More reference expression data
Gene ontology
Molecular function	catalytic activity; hydrolase activity; cis-stilbene-oxide hydrolase activity; epoxide hydrolase activity; enzyme binding
Cellular component	integral component of membrane; organelle membrane; endoplasmic reticulum membrane; endoplasmic reticulum; membrane; intracellular membrane-bounded organelle; plasma membrane
Biological process	cellular aromatic compound metabolic process; xenobiotic metabolic process; aromatic compound catabolic process; response to organic cyclic compound; response to toxic substance; epoxide metabolic process; liver development; diol biosynthetic process; cellular response to organic substance; cellular response to glucocorticoid stimulus
Sources:Amigo / QuickGO
Orthologs
Databases	NCBI: entry; OMA: entry
Species	Human	Mouse
Entrez	2052	13849
Ensembl	ENSG00000143819	ENSMUSG00000038776
UniProt	P07099	Q9D379
RefSeq (mRNA)	NM_001291163; NM_000120; NM_001136018	NM_010145; NM_001312918
RefSeq (protein)	NP_000111; NP_001129490; NP_001278092; NP_001365355; NP_001365356 NP_001365357; NP_001365358; NP_001365359; NP_001365360; NP_001365361	NP_001299847; NP_034275
Location (UCSC)	Chr 1: 225.81 – 225.85 Mb	Chr 1: 180.8 – 180.85 Mb
PubMed search
- Wikidata
View/Edit Human	View/Edit Mouse

Epoxide hydrolase 1 is an enzyme encoded by the EPHX1 gene in humans.

== Function ==
Epoxide hydrolase plays an important role in both the activation and detoxification of exogenous chemicals such as polycyclic aromatic hydrocarbons.

== Discovery ==
Microsomal epoxide hydrolase 1 (EPHX1) was first isolated by Watabe and Kanehira from rabbit liver and later also purified from human liver and characterized. EPHX1 belongs to the family of α/β hydrolases and converts epoxides to diols.

== Tissue distribution ==
EPHX1 protein can be found predominantly in the membrane fraction of the endoplasmic reticulum of eucaryotic cells. Its expression in mammals is generally the highest in the liver, followed by adrenal gland, lung, kidney, and intestine. It was found also in bronchial epithelial cells and upper gastrointestinal tract. EPHX1 expression is individually variable among humans and it can be modestly induced by chemicals as phenobarbital, β-naphtoflavone, benzanthracene, trans-stilbene oxide, etc.

== Gene structure and ontology ==
Human EPHX1 orthologues were found in 127 organisms. Human microsomal epoxide hydrolase is coded by EPHX1 gene located on chromosome 1 (1q42.12). Three transcription variants differing in the 5'-untranslated region have been identified with length of 455 amino acids.

== Function ==
Conversion of epoxides to trans-dihydrodiols presents prototypical EPHX1 reaction. EPHX1 has broad substrate specificity. EPHX1 detoxifies low molecular weight chemicals, e.g., butadiene, benzene, styrene, etc., but more complex compounds as polycyclic aromatic hydrocarbons are rather bioactivated to genotoxic species.

EPHX1 mediates the sodium-dependent transport of bile acids into hepatocytes. Androstene oxide and epoxyestratrienol have been shown as endogenous EPHX1 substrates. EPHX1 also metabolizes endocannabinoid 2-arachidonoylglycerol to arachidonic acid and may play an important role in the endocannabinoid signaling pathway.

== Clinical significance ==
Mutations in EPHX1 have been linked with preeclampsia, elevated blood levels of bile salts (i.e. hypercholanemia), Fetal hydantoin syndrome, and diphenylhydantoin toxicity. Functional single nucleotide polymorphisms (SNPs) in EPHX1 have been found and frequently studied. Two SNPs – Y113H (rs1051740, T337C) and H139R (rs2234922, A416G) – seemed to influence EPHX1 activity in vitro and their combination was used for deduction of EPHX1 activity. However, their functional effect was not confirmed in human liver microsomes.

Due to the EPHX1 role in metabolism of procarcinogens and existence of gene variations with functional effect a number of association studies has been conducted. Significant associations between EPHX1 SNPs and risk of lung, upper aerodigestive tract, breast, and ovarian cancers have been observed in various populations. Meta-analyses confirmed associations of rs1051740 and rs2234922 SNPs with the risk of lung cancer. Meta-analyses reporting no association of these SNPs with esophageal and hepatocellular cancer risk have been reported as well). Genetically predicted low EPHX1 activity was associated with increased risk of developing tobacco-related cancer in smokers from 47089 Danish individuals. Recent meta-analysis comprising 8,259 patients with chronic obstructive pulmonary disease (COPD) and 42,883 controls reported that the predicted slow activity EPHX1 phenotype is a significant risk factor for COPD in Caucasian, but not in Asian population. Role of EPHX1 expression in pathogenesis of neurodegeneration as Alzheimer's disease, methamphetamine-induced drug dependence, and cerebral metabolism of epoxyeicosatrienoic acids was suggested. Modulation of metabolism of epoxyeicosatrienoic acids by EPHX1 may interfere with, e.g., signal transmission of neurons, vasodilation, cardiovascular homeostasis, and inflammation. Transformation of the current knowledge about EPHX1 into clinical applications is, however, limited by the lack of crystal structure of the enzyme and by the complex relations between its genotype and phenotype.
