= Microsomal epoxide hydrolase =

Enzyme

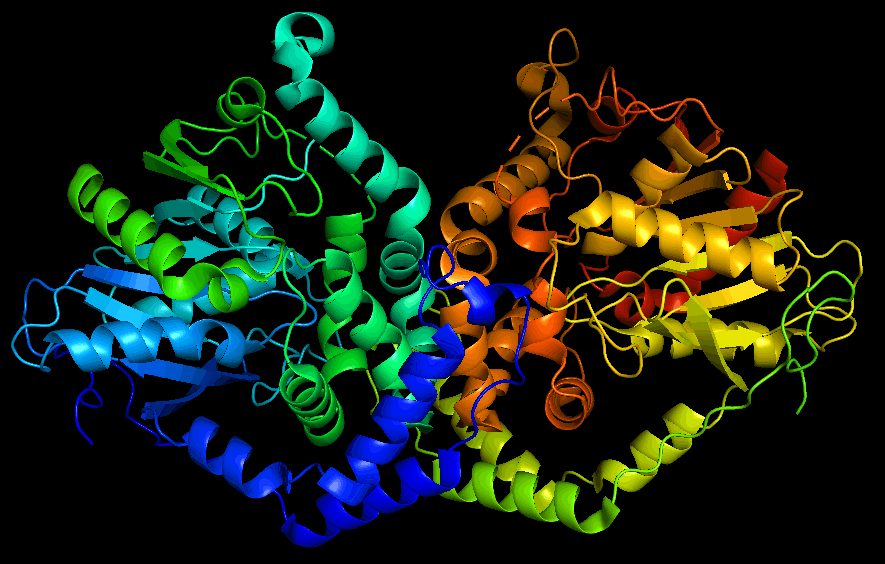
- A cartoon depiction of microsomal epoxide hydrolase from Aspergillus niger

Identifiers
- EC no.: 3.3.2.9

Databases
- IntEnz: IntEnz view
- BRENDA: BRENDA entry
- ExPASy: NiceZyme view
- KEGG: KEGG entry
- MetaCyc: metabolic pathway
- PRIAM: profile
- PDB structures: RCSB PDB PDBe PDBsum
Search
- PMC: articles
- PubMed: articles
- NCBI: proteins

In enzymology, a microsomal epoxide hydrolase (mEH) (EC 3.3.2.9) is an enzyme that catalyzes the hydrolysis reaction between an epoxide and water to form a diol.

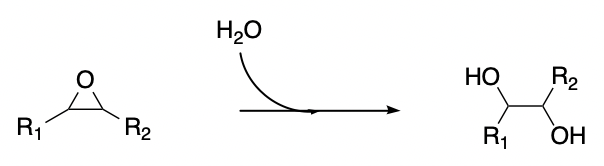
Hydrolysis of an epoxide ring

This enzyme plays a role in the uptake of bile salts within the large intestine. It functions as a Na+ dependent transporter. This enzyme participates in metabolism of xenobiotics by cytochrome p450. mEH has been identified as playing a large role in the detoxification and bioactivation of a wide variety of substrates, such as polycyclic aromatic hydrocarbons (PAHs), which are known for their carcinogenic properties.

The human homolog of microsomal epoxide hydrolase is EPHX1 and is located on chromosome 1.

== Nomenclature ==
This enzyme belongs to the family of hydrolases, specifically those acting on ether bonds (ether hydrolases). The systematic name of this enzyme class is cis-stilbene-oxide hydrolase. Other names in common use include epoxide hydratase (ambiguous), microsomal epoxide hydratase (ambiguous), epoxide hydrase, microsomal epoxide hydrase, arene-oxide hydratase (ambiguous), benzo[a]pyrene-4,5-oxide hydratase, benzo(a)pyrene-4,5-epoxide hydratase, aryl epoxide hydrase (ambiguous), cis-epoxide hydrolase, and mEH.

== Structure ==
Microsomal epoxide hydrolase is a single polypeptide chain composed of 455 amino acids with a molecular weight of 52.96 kDa. It is known that the N-terminal region of the enzyme is responsible for anchoring the protein to the cell membrane, while the C-terminal region of the enzyme contains catalytic residues. Microsomal epoxide hydrolase belongs to the superfamily α/β-hydrolase fold enzymes. The center of all α/β-hydrolase fold enzymes is an alpha/beta-sheet consisted of 8 beta strands connected by 6 alpha helices. The three dimensional structure of mEH has been elucidated from Aspergillus niger. Although no 3D modeling has been solved for the mammalian mEH enzyme (EPHX1), the overall homology between fungal and mammalian mEH is relatively high. This high homology has allowed for the elucidation overall general structure and subsequent catalytic mechanism of EPHX1 in humans by comparisons to existing structures of fungal mEH.

== Mechanism ==
α/β-hydrolase fold enzymes use a catalytic triad in their active site. The catalytic triad present in microsomal epoxide hydrolase is composed of glutamine, histidine and aspartic acid. The substrate is positioned in an orientation poised for nucleophilic attack through hydrogen bonding stabilization from two nearby tyrosine residues The proposed mechanism for the mEH-catalyzed reaction first involves a nucleophilic attack on the oxirane ring of the substrate from the aspartic acid residue near the active site, which forms an ester intermediate. The second step in this mechanism is hydrolysis of the ester that occurs by an activated water molecule. The activation of water is facilitated by proton abstraction via the catalytic triad between a water molecule, glutamine, and histidine. After hydrolysis, the substrate is then released from its bond to the aspartic acid residue, liberating the diol product from the enzyme active site.

The mechanism of microsomal epoxide hydrolase

The active site of this enzyme lies within a hydrophobic pocket in the enzyme, which in turn leads to the enzyme's preferential reactivity with molecules with hydrophobic side-chains. The mEH enzyme typically binds to small organic epoxides, such as styrene epoxide and cis-stillbene-oxide. mEH does not catalyze the hydrolysis of bulkier molecules, as their large side-chains may sterically disrupt the charge relay system responsible for water activation.

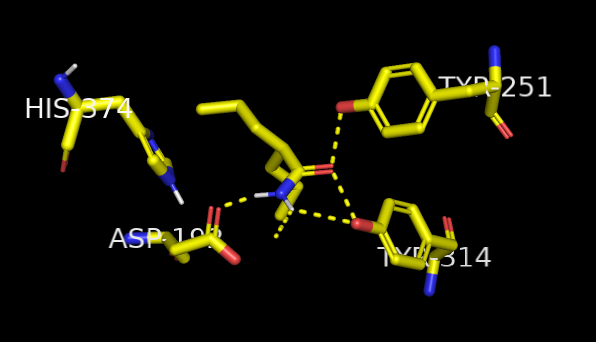
Active site of mEH from Aspergillus niger bound to small molecule 2-propoylpentanamide.

== Function ==
In humans, mEH has been found in the ovary, lung, kidney, lymphocytes, epithelial cells, and liver. Microsomal epoxide hydrolase serves as a protective enzyme against potentially harmful small molecules derived from the external environment. This hydrolysis of genotoxic epoxides causes subsequent effects in several signal transduction pathways, rendering this enzyme important to metabolism.

== Disease relevance ==
Microsomal epoxide hydrolase plays a large role in its effects on human health. Studies have shown that mutations EPHX1 in humans may be the cause of hypercholanemia, preeclampsia, and may contribute to fetal hydantoin syndrome. Research also suggests that maternal polymorphisms in EPHX1 in pregnant women were related to facial malformations of children born from women taking phenytoin during their first trimester of pregnancy. While mEH participates in the protection of human health via detoxification of various environmental substances, it also has been found to facilitate the activation of carcinogens.

mEH detoxifies reactive epoxides that are commonly caused from cigarette smoke, and as such it is hypothesized that mutations in EPHX1 in humans may have an effect on an individual's susceptibility to COPD, emphysema and lung cancer. Some sources have demonstrated that individuals affected by COPD have a higher rate of containing an under-active variant of the EPHX1 gene, yet also demonstrated that the overactive variant of the gene was also found in higher frequencies in individuals affected by disease as well. Other research has provided evidence supporting the idea that EPHX1 variants do not contribute to susceptibility of disease, but do contribute to disease severity. The role that mEH plays in lung cancer and COPD is still not fully elucidated, as the data on the topic in the literature is not completely unanimous.

There is some evidence that mEH variants may contribute to the occurrence of childhood asthma in combination with variants on the GSTP1 gene.

Compared to soluble epoxide hydrolase, the contribution of mEH to metabolism of beneficial epoxy fatty acids such as Epoxyeicosatrienoic acid is considered minor since they are relatively poor mEH substrates in vitro. Yet, in vivo, it was found that mEH can play a considerable role in regulation of EET levels and hence inhibition of mEH or dual inhibition of mEH and sEH might have therapeutic potential. Amide, amine and urea based mEH inhibitors have been explored. Based on the most potent inhibitors characterized, an amide with a bulky alpha-substituent and a phenyl ring with lipophilic groups at meta-positions appear to be key pharmacophore units.

The overall effect that mEH has on human health is still debated, with some sources finding evidence that the overactive EPHX1 gene is the culprit for some diseases, while other evidence supports that the under active variant is the cause of others.
