= Cholesterol-5,6-oxide hydrolase =

Class of enzymes

Identifiers
- EC no.: 3.3.2.11

Databases
- BRENDA: enzyme data
- ExPASy: NiceZyme view
- KEGG: enzyme entry
- MetaCyc: metabolic pathway
- Rhea: reactions
- PDB structures: RCSB PDB PDBe PDBsum
Search
- PMC: articles
- PubMed: articles
- NCBI: proteins

Cholesterol-5,6-oxide hydrolase (EC 3.3.2.11, cholesterol-epoxide hydrolase, ChEH) is an enzyme with systematic name 5,6alpha-epoxy-5alpha-cholestan-3beta-ol hydrolase. It catalyses two related chemical reaction in which oxycholesterols are hydrolysed and their epoxide ring is converted to a vicinal diol. For example, cholesterol-5β,6β-epoxide reacts to form 3β,5α,6β-trihydroxycholestane:

cholesterol-5β,6β-epoxide
H_{2}O
3β,5α,6β-trihydroxycholestane

The enzyme has been characterised from liver and it acts equally well on cholesterol-5α,6α-epoxide to give the same trihydroxy product.

Cholesterol-5,6-oxide hydrolase (ChEH) is an intracellular membranous enzyme localized mainly on the endoplasmic reticulum of cells. Its molecular characterization revealed it is composed of two proteinaceous sub-units: the 3β-hydroxysteroid delta8-delta7-isomerase (D8D7I), also known as the emopamil binding protein (EBP), which is the catalytic subunit, and the 3β-hydroxysteroid delta7 reductase (DHCR7), which is the regulatory subunit. The ChEH is the so-called microsomal antiestrogen binding site (AEBS), a secondary target of the antitumor drug tamoxifen and related compounds. The ChEH is inhibited by different pharmacological classes of drugs including anticancer drugs such as tamoxifen and natural substances such as ring B-oxysterols and poly-unsaturated fatty acids.
