= LPIN1 =

Protein-coding gene in the species Homo sapiens

Identifiers
- Aliases: LPIN1, PAP1, lipin 1
- External IDs: OMIM: 605518; MGI: 1891340; GeneCards: LPIN1
Enzyme activity
EC #	BRENDA	ExPASy	KEGG	MetaCyc
3.1.3.4	↗	↗	↗	↗

Gene location (Human)
Chr.	Chromosome 2 (human)
Band	2p25.1	Start	11,677,595 bp
Band	2p25.1	End	11,827,409 bp

Gene location (Mouse)
Chr.	Chromosome 12 (mouse)
Band	12 A1.1|12 7.9 cM	Start	16,585,670 bp
Band	12 A1.1|12 7.9 cM	End	16,696,967 bp
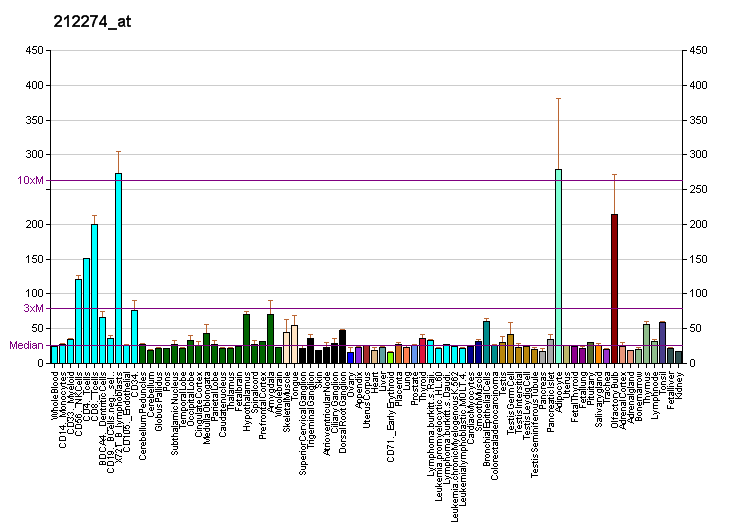

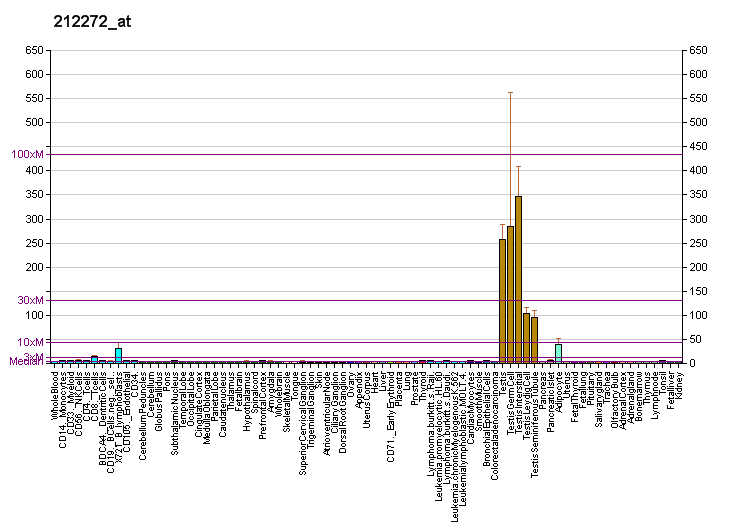

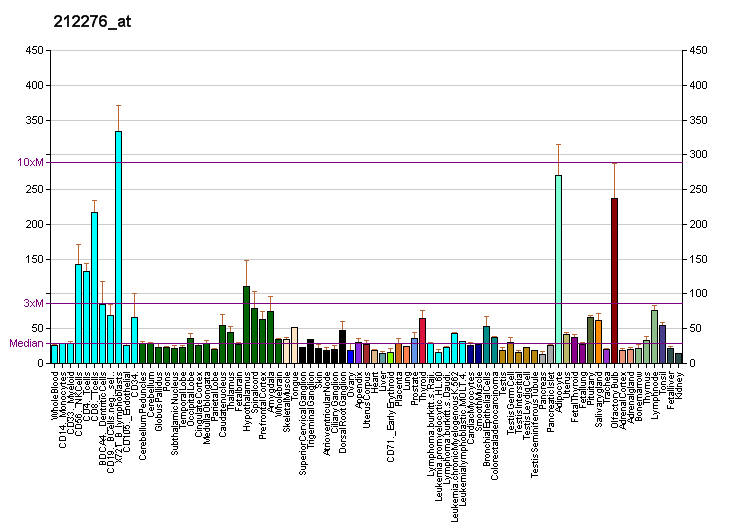
RNA expression pattern
Bgee	Human / Mouse (ortholog); Top expressed in: sperm; olfactory bulb; buccal mucosa cell; trigeminal ganglion; sural nerve; gastrocnemius muscle; spinal ganglia; right testis; left testis; quadriceps femoris muscle / Top expressed in: triceps brachii muscle; muscle of thigh; medial head of gastrocnemius muscle; digastric muscle; brown adipose tissue; sternocleidomastoid muscle; temporal muscle; vastus lateralis muscle; tibialis anterior muscle; tunica adventitia of aorta; More reference expression data
BioGPS	More reference expression data
Gene ontology
Molecular function	transcription coactivator activity; hydrolase activity; phosphatidate phosphatase activity; molecular function
Cellular component	cytoplasm; cytosol; nuclear membrane; nuclear envelope; endoplasmic reticulum membrane; membrane; nucleoplasm; mitochondrial outer membrane; endoplasmic reticulum; nucleus
Biological process	fatty acid catabolic process; regulation of transcription, DNA-templated; lipid metabolism; regulation of transcription by RNA polymerase II; phosphatidylethanolamine biosynthetic process; transcription, DNA-templated; fatty acid metabolic process; mitotic nuclear membrane disassembly; animal organ regeneration; cellular response to insulin stimulus; triglyceride biosynthetic process; phosphatidylcholine biosynthetic process; positive regulation of transcription by RNA polymerase II; triglyceride mobilization; dephosphorylation; positive regulation of cold-induced thermogenesis
Sources:Amigo / QuickGO
Orthologs
Databases	NCBI: entry; OMA: entry
Species	Human	Mouse
Entrez	23175	14245
Ensembl	ENSG00000134324	ENSMUSG00000020593
UniProt	Q14693	Q91ZP3
RefSeq (mRNA)	NM_001261427; NM_001261428; NM_001261429; NM_145693; NM_001349199 NM_001349200; NM_001349201; NM_001349202; NM_001349203; NM_001349204; NM_001349205; NM_001349206; NM_001349207; NM_001349208	NM_001130412; NM_015763; NM_172950; NM_001355598
RefSeq (protein)	NP_001248356; NP_001248357; NP_663731; NP_001336128; NP_001336129 NP_001336130; NP_001336131; NP_001336132; NP_001336133; NP_001336134; NP_001336135; NP_001336136; NP_001336137	NP_001123884; NP_056578; NP_766538; NP_001342527
Location (UCSC)	Chr 2: 11.68 – 11.83 Mb	Chr 12: 16.59 – 16.7 Mb
PubMed search
- Wikidata
View/Edit Human	View/Edit Mouse

Lipin-1 is a protein that in humans is encoded by the LPIN1 gene.

== Function ==
Lipin-1 has phosphatidate phosphatase activity. The nuclear localization of Lipin 1 is regulated by the mammalian Target Of Rapamycin protein kinase and links mTORC1 activity to the regulation of Sterol regulatory element-binding proteins (SREBP)-dependent gene transcription.

== Clinical significance ==
Homozygous mutations in LPIN1 gene in humans cause recurrent rhabdomyolysis and exercise-induced myalgia while carrier state may predispose for statin-induced myopathy.

This gene also represents a candidate gene for human lipodystrophy, characterized by loss of body fat, fatty liver, hypertriglyceridemia, and insulin resistance. Mouse studies suggest that this gene functions during normal adipose tissue development and may also play a role in human triglyceride metabolism.
