= Lipid-phosphate phosphatase =

Identifiers
- EC no.: 3.1.3.76

Databases
- IntEnz: IntEnz view
- BRENDA: BRENDA entry
- ExPASy: NiceZyme view
- KEGG: KEGG entry
- MetaCyc: metabolic pathway
- PRIAM: profile
- PDB structures: RCSB PDB PDBe PDBsum
Search
- PMC: articles
- PubMed: articles
- NCBI: proteins

The enzyme lipid-phosphate phosphatase (EC 3.1.3.76) catalyzes the reaction

(9S,10S)-10-hydroxy-9-(phosphonooxy)octadecanoate + H_{2}O $\rightleftharpoons$ (9S,10S)-9,10-dihydroxyoctadecanoate + phosphate

This enzyme belongs to the family of hydrolases, specifically those acting on phosphoric monoester bonds. The systematic name is (9S,10S)-10-hydroxy-9-(phosphonooxy)octadecanoate phosphohydrolase. Other names in common use include hydroxy fatty acid phosphatase, dihydroxy fatty acid phosphatase, hydroxy lipid phosphatase, sEH (ambiguous), and soluble epoxide hydrolase (ambiguous).

== See also ==
- Epoxide hydrolase 2
