= Phospholipid phosphatase 2 =

Enzyme found in humans

PLPP2

Identifiers
- Aliases: PLPP2, LPP2, PAP-2c, PAP2-g, PPAP2C, Phosphatidic acid phosphatase 2c, phospholipid phosphatase 2
- External IDs: OMIM: 607126; MGI: 1354945; GeneCards: PLPP2
Enzyme activity
EC #	BRENDA	ExPASy	KEGG	MetaCyc
3.1.3.4	↗	↗	↗	↗

Gene location (Human)
Chr.	Chromosome 19 (human)
Band	19p13.3	Start	281,040 bp
Band	19p13.3	End	291,403 bp

Gene location (Mouse)
Chr.	Chromosome 10 (mouse)
Band	10 C1|10 39.72 cM	Start	79,362,264 bp
Band	10 C1|10 39.72 cM	End	79,369,630 bp
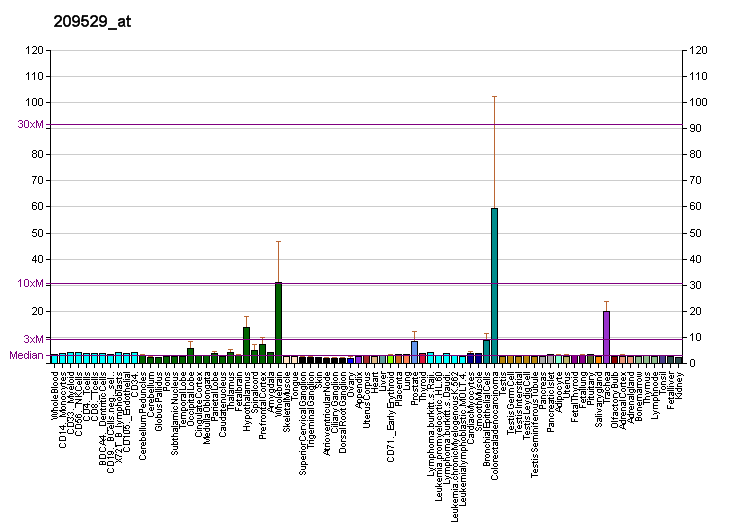
RNA expression pattern
Bgee	Human / Mouse (ortholog); Top expressed in: olfactory zone of nasal mucosa; right uterine tube; mucosa of transverse colon; minor salivary glands; C1 segment; gallbladder; epithelium of bronchus; skin of abdomen; bronchial epithelial cell; skin of leg / Top expressed in: ileum; duodenum; crypt of lieberkuhn of small intestine; pyloric antrum; intestinal villus; transitional epithelium of urinary bladder; jejunum; medullary collecting duct; left colon; endothelial cell of lymphatic vessel; More reference expression data
BioGPS	More reference expression data
Gene ontology
Molecular function	phosphoprotein phosphatase activity; protein binding; lipid phosphatase activity; hydrolase activity; sphingosine-1-phosphate phosphatase activity; phosphatidate phosphatase activity; phosphatase activity
Cellular component	integral component of membrane; plasma membrane; integral component of plasma membrane; membrane
Biological process	phospholipid metabolic process; sphingolipid biosynthetic process; phospholipid dephosphorylation; signal transduction; protein dephosphorylation
Sources:Amigo / QuickGO
Orthologs
Databases	NCBI: entry; OMA: entry
Species	Human	Mouse
Entrez	8612	50784
Ensembl	ENSG00000141934	ENSMUSG00000052151
UniProt	O43688	Q9DAX2
RefSeq (mRNA)	NM_003712; NM_177526; NM_177543	NM_015817; NM_001302389; NM_001302390; NM_001302442
RefSeq (protein)	NP_003703; NP_803545; NP_808211	NP_001289318; NP_001289319; NP_001289371; NP_056632
Location (UCSC)	Chr 19: 0.28 – 0.29 Mb	Chr 10: 79.36 – 79.37 Mb
PubMed search
- Wikidata
View/Edit Human	View/Edit Mouse

Phospholipid phosphatase 2 is an enzyme that in humans is encoded by the gene PLPP2 (formerly PPAP2C).

The protein encoded by this gene is a member of the phosphatidic acid phosphatase (PAP) family. PAPs convert phosphatidic acid to diacylglycerol, and function in de novo synthesis of glycerolipids as well as in receptor-activated signal transduction mediated by phospholipase D. This protein is similar to phosphatidic acid phosphatase type 2A (PPAP2A) and type 2B (PPAP2B). All three proteins contain 6 transmembrane regions, and a consensus N-glycosylation site. This protein has been shown to possess membrane associated PAP activity. Three alternatively spliced transcript variants encoding distinct isoforms have been reported.
