= Mesoderm-specific transcript homolog protein =

Mammalian protein found in Homo sapiens

MEST

Identifiers
- Aliases: MEST, PEG1, mesoderm specific transcript
- External IDs: OMIM: 601029; MGI: 96968; GeneCards: MEST

Gene location (Human)
| Chr. | Chromosome 7 (human) |
| Band | 7q32.2 | Start | 130,486,171 bp |
| Band | 7q32.2 | End | 130,506,465 bp |

Gene location (Mouse)
| Chr. | Chromosome 6 (mouse) |
| Band | 6 A3.3|6 12.53 cM | Start | 30,723,547 bp |
| Band | 6 A3.3|6 12.53 cM | End | 30,748,465 bp |
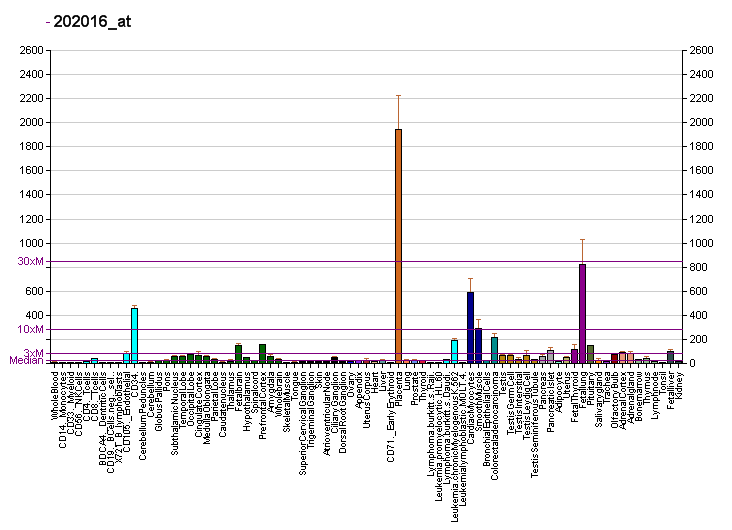
RNA expression pattern
| Bgee | Human / Mouse (ortholog); Top expressed in: cartilage tissue; placenta; secondary oocyte; pericardium; parietal pleura; ventricular zone; abdominal fat; embryo; lactiferous duct; right adrenal gland / Top expressed in: mandibular prominence; dermis; left lung lobe; human fetus; atrium; abdominal wall; genital tubercle; maxillary prominence; efferent ductule; Gonadal ridge; More reference expression data |
| BioGPS | More reference expression data |
Gene ontology
| Molecular function | catalytic activity; hydrolase activity |
| Cellular component | integral component of membrane; extracellular exosome; endoplasmic reticulum membrane; endoplasmic reticulum; membrane |
| Biological process | mesoderm development; regulation of lipid storage |
Sources:Amigo / QuickGO
Orthologs
| Databases | NCBI: entry; OMA: entry |
| Species | Human | Mouse |
| Entrez | 4232 | 17294 |
| Ensembl | ENSG00000106484 | ENSMUSG00000051855 |
| UniProt | Q5EB52 | Q07646 |
| RefSeq (mRNA) | NM_001253900; NM_001253901; NM_001253902; NM_002402; NM_177524 NM_177525 | NM_001252292; NM_001252293; NM_008590 |
| RefSeq (protein) | NP_001240829; NP_001240830; NP_001240831; NP_002393; NP_803490 NP_803491 | NP_001239221; NP_001239222; NP_032616 |
| Location (UCSC) | Chr 7: 130.49 – 130.51 Mb | Chr 6: 30.72 – 30.75 Mb |
| PubMed search |
- Wikidata
| View/Edit Human | View/Edit Mouse |

Mesoderm-specific transcript homolog protein is a protein that in humans is encoded by the MEST gene.

This gene encodes a member of the Alpha/beta hydrolase superfamily and has isoform-specific imprinting.

== Gene ==
Three transcript variants encoding two distinct isoforms have been identified for this gene. A pseudogene for this locus is located on chromosome 6.

== Function ==
MEST is highly expressed during embryonic development, particularly in mesoderm-derived tissues, and is implicated in the regulation of fetal growth and differentiation. It is also expressed in the placenta, where it is thought to contribute to nutrient exchange and the establishment of normal growth trajectories.

== Clinical significance ==
The loss of imprinting of this gene has been linked to certain types of cancer and may be due to promoter switching.

In humans, dysregulation of paternal MEST imprinting has been linked to imprinting disorders such as Silver-Russel syndrome, supporting its role in epigenetic control of growth and development.

== Animal studies ==
In animal models, Disruption of MEST expression has been associated with growth abnormalities, including reduced fetal growth and altered adipose development.
