= Leukotriene-A4 hydrolase =

LTA4H
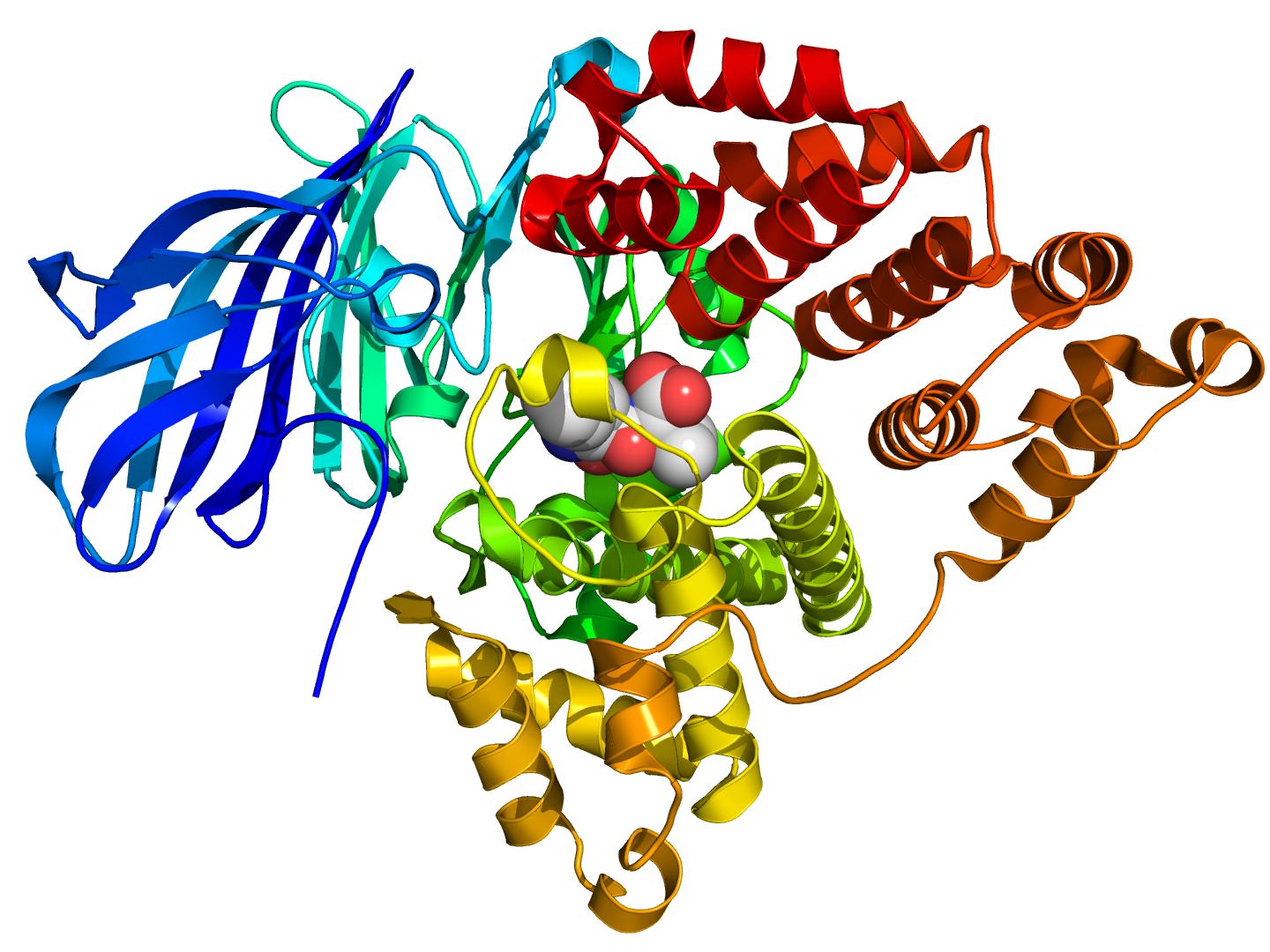

Identifiers
- Aliases: LTA4H, leukotriene A4 hydrolase
- External IDs: OMIM: 151570; MGI: 96836; GeneCards: LTA4H
Available structures
PDB	Ortholog search: PDBe RCSB
PDB	List of PDB id codes 1GW6, 1H19, 1HS6, 1SQM, 2R59, 2VJ8, 3B7R, 3B7S, 3B7T, 3B7U, 3CHO, 3CHP, 3CHQ, 3CHR, 3CHS, 3FH5, 3FH7, 3FH8, 3FHE, 3FTS, 3FTU, 3FTV, 3FTW, 3FTX, 3FTY, 3FTZ, 3FU0, 3FU3, 3FU5, 3FU6, 3FUD, 3FUE, 3FUF, 3FUH, 3FUI, 3FUJ, 3FUK, 3FUL, 3FUM, 3FUN, 3U9W, 4DPR, 4L2L, 4MKT, 4MS6, 5AEN, 4RVB, 4RSY, 4R7L
Enzyme activity
EC #	BRENDA	ExPASy	KEGG	MetaCyc
3.3.2.6	↗	↗	↗	↗
3.4.11.4	↗	↗	↗	↗

Gene location (Human)
Chr.	Chromosome 12 (human)
Band	12q23.1	Start	96,000,753 bp
Band	12q23.1	End	96,043,520 bp

Gene location (Mouse)
Chr.	Chromosome 10 (mouse)
Band	10|10 C2	Start	93,289,273 bp
Band	10|10 C2	End	93,320,737 bp
RNA expression pattern
Bgee	Human / Mouse (ortholog); Top expressed in: monocyte; granulocyte; visceral pleura; trabecular bone; bone marrow; germinal epithelium; secondary oocyte; lower lobe of lung; blood; bone marrow cell / Top expressed in: granulocyte; ileum; duodenum; tibiofemoral joint; atrium; atrioventricular valve; endocardial cushion; dermis; jejunum; thymus; More reference expression data
BioGPS	n/a
Gene ontology
Molecular function	leukotriene-A4 hydrolase activity; peptide binding; metal ion binding; peptidase activity; protein binding; aminopeptidase activity; hydrolase activity; metallopeptidase activity; RNA binding; epoxide hydrolase activity; zinc ion binding; metalloaminopeptidase activity
Cellular component	nucleoplasm; extracellular exosome; extracellular region; nucleus; cytoplasm; cytosol; tertiary granule lumen; ficolin-1-rich granule lumen
Biological process	proteolysis; peptide catabolic process; leukotriene metabolic process; neutrophil degranulation; leukotriene biosynthetic process; cellular lipid metabolic process; long-chain fatty acid biosynthetic process
Sources:Amigo / QuickGO
Orthologs
Databases	NCBI: entry; OMA: entry
Species	Human	Mouse
Entrez	4048	16993
Ensembl	ENSG00000111144	ENSMUSG00000015889
UniProt	P09960	P24527
RefSeq (mRNA)	NM_000895; NM_001256643; NM_001256644	NM_008517; NM_001313897
RefSeq (protein)	NP_000886; NP_001243572; NP_001243573	NP_001300826; NP_032543
Location (UCSC)	Chr 12: 96 – 96.04 Mb	Chr 10: 93.29 – 93.32 Mb
PubMed search
- Wikidata
View/Edit Human	View/Edit Mouse

leukotriene-A4 hydrolase

Identifiers
- EC no.: 3.3.2.6
- CAS no.: 90119-07-6

Databases
- BRENDA: enzyme data
- ExPASy: NiceZyme view
- KEGG: enzyme entry
- MetaCyc: metabolic pathway
- Rhea: reactions
- PDB structures: RCSB PDB PDBe PDBsum
- Gene Ontology: AmiGO / QuickGO
Search
- PMC: articles
- PubMed: articles
- NCBI: proteins

leukotriene A4 hydrolase
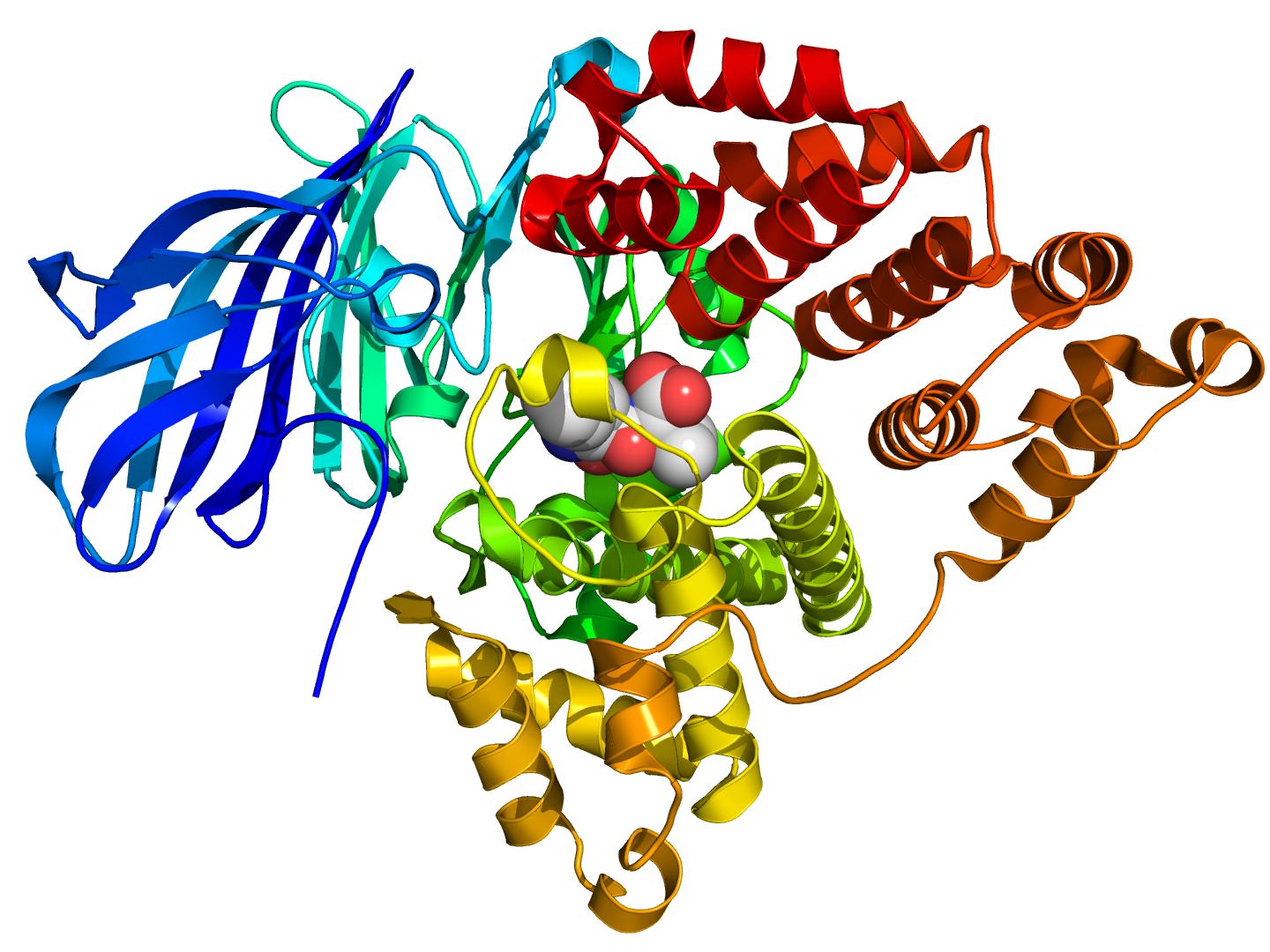
- Crystallographic structure of LTA4H (rainbow colored N-terminus = blue, C-terminus = red) complexed with the protease inhibitor bestatin (space-filling model, carbon = white, oxygen = red, nitrogen = blue) based on the PDB: 1HS6 structure.

Identifiers
- Symbol: LTA4H
- NCBI gene: 4048
- HGNC: 6710
- OMIM: 151570
- PDB: 1SQM
- RefSeq: NM_000895
- UniProt: P09960

Other data
- EC number: 3.3.2.6
- Locus: Chr. 12 q22
Search for
- Structures: Swiss-model
- Domains: InterPro

Leukotriene-A4 hydrolase is an enzyme that catalyzes the reaction which converts Leukotriene A4 to Leukotriene B4. It is a bifunctional zinc enzyme (EC 3.3.2.6) with different amino acids attached to it to aid in the catalysis of the reaction. It also acts as an aminopeptidase. Leukotriene-A4 hydrolase is a cytosolic protein and is found in almost all mammalian cells, tissues and organelles that have been examined.

== Function ==
This enzyme belongs to the family of hydrolases, specifically those acting on ether bonds (ether hydrolases). The systematic name of this enzyme class is (7E,9E,11Z,14Z)-(5S,6S)-5,6-epoxyicosa-7,9,11,14-tetraenoate hydrolase. Other names in common use include LTA4 hydrolase, LTA4H, and leukotriene A4 hydrolase. This enzyme participates in arachidonic acid metabolism.

== Catalyzed reaction ==
The chemical reaction catalyzed by LTA4H.

Leukotriene A4 Hydrolase catalyzes the reaction which converts leukotriene A4 to leukotriene B4. The Leukotriene A4 structure contains an epoxide ring functional group, which are highly reactive due to its ring strain making them extremely electrophilic. This drives the reaction forward, favouring the products Leukotriene B4. Leukotriene A4 hydrolase adds a water molecule across the epoxide ring on Leukotriene A4. The addition of the water molecule opens the epoxide ring and causes the formation of the Hydroxy group at the carbon attached to the oxygen from the epoxide. The second carbon involved in the epoxide ring remains the same resulting in leukotriene B4. The water molecule attacking the double bond also forms into a hydroxy group after work-up. The product of the reaction is Leukotriene B4.

== Structure ==
As of late 2007, 4 structures have been solved for this class of enzymes, with PDB accession codes PDB: 1GW6, PDB: 1H19, PDB: 1HS6, and PDB: 1SQM.
