= Epoxide hydrolase 2 =

Protein-coding gene in the species Homo sapiens

EPHX2
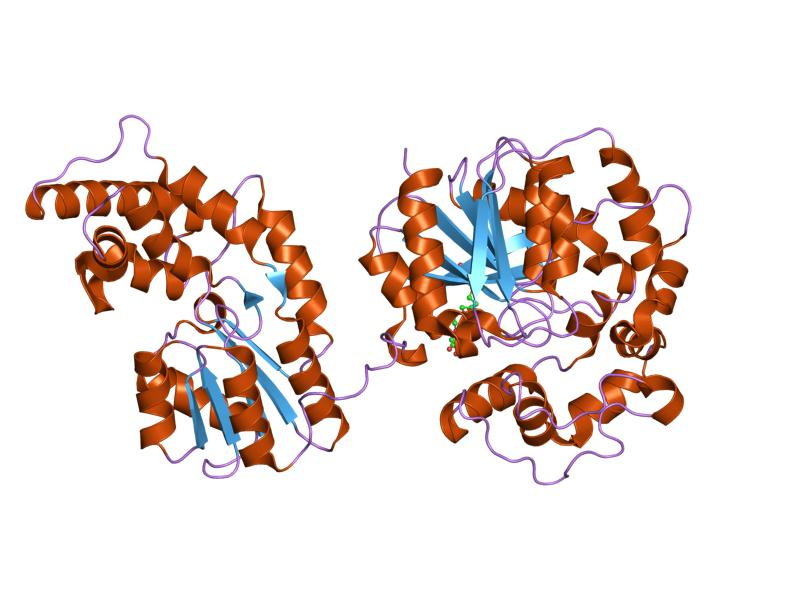

Identifiers
- Aliases: EPHX2, CEH, SEH, Epoxide hydrolase 2, ABHD20
- External IDs: OMIM: 132811; MGI: 99500; GeneCards: EPHX2
Available structures
PDB	Ortholog search: PDBe RCSB
PDB	List of PDB id codes 1S8O, 1VJ5, 1ZD2, 1ZD3, 1ZD4, 1ZD5, 3ANS, 3ANT, 3I1Y, 3I28, 3KOO, 3OTQ, 3PDC, 3WK4, 3WK5, 3WK6, 3WK7, 3WK8, 3WK9, 3WKA, 3WKB, 3WKC, 3WKD, 3WKE, 4C4X, 4C4Y, 4C4Z, 4HAI, 4J03, 4JNC, 4OCZ, 4OD0, 4X6X, 4X6Y, 4Y2J, 4Y2P, 4Y2Q, 4Y2R, 4Y2S, 4Y2T, 4Y2U, 4Y2V, 4Y2X, 4Y2Y, 5AHX, 5AI0, 5AI4, 5AI5, 5AI6, 5AI8, 5AI9, 5AIA, 5AIB, 5AIC, 5AK3, 5AK4, 5AK5, 5AK6, 5AKE, 5AKG, 5AKH, 5AKI, 5AKJ, 5AKK, 5AKL, 5AKX, 5AKY, 5AKZ, 5ALD, 5ALE, 5ALF, 5ALG, 5ALH, 5ALI, 5ALJ, 5ALK, 5ALL, 5ALM, 5ALN, 5ALO, 5ALP, 5ALQ, 5ALR, 5ALS, 5ALT, 5ALU, 5ALV, 5ALW, 5ALX, 5ALY, 5ALZ, 5AM0, 5AM1, 5AM2, 5AM3, 5AM4, 5AM5, 5FP0
Enzyme activity
EC #	BRENDA	ExPASy	KEGG	MetaCyc
3.1.3.76	↗	↗	↗	↗
3.3.2.10	↗	↗	↗	↗

Gene location (Human)
Chr.	Chromosome 8 (human)
Band	8p21.2-p21.1	Start	27,490,781 bp
Band	8p21.2-p21.1	End	27,545,564 bp

Gene location (Mouse)
Chr.	Chromosome 14 (mouse)
Band	14 D1|14 34.36 cM	Start	66,321,823 bp
Band	14 D1|14 34.36 cM	End	66,361,949 bp
RNA expression pattern
Bgee	Human / Mouse (ortholog); Top expressed in: right lobe of liver; mucosa of transverse colon; right adrenal gland; right adrenal cortex; rectum; left adrenal cortex; body of pancreas; human kidney; right uterine tube; jejunal mucosa / Top expressed in: right kidney; left lobe of liver; brown adipose tissue; duodenum; myocardium of ventricle; cumulus cell; cardiac muscles; tunica adventitia of aorta; right ventricle; human kidney; More reference expression data
BioGPS	n/a
Gene ontology
Molecular function	10-hydroxy-9-(phosphonooxy)octadecanoate phosphatase activity; phosphatase activity; metal ion binding; catalytic activity; lipid phosphatase activity; signaling receptor binding; hydrolase activity; magnesium ion binding; toxic substance binding; protein homodimerization activity; epoxide hydrolase activity
Cellular component	extracellular exosome; peroxisome; cytosol; cytoplasm; peroxisomal matrix
Biological process	phospholipid dephosphorylation; lipid metabolism; epoxygenase P450 pathway; cellular calcium ion homeostasis; reactive oxygen species metabolic process; regulation of blood pressure; regulation of cholesterol metabolic process; stilbene catabolic process; xenobiotic metabolic process; metabolism; aromatic compound catabolic process; inflammatory response; dephosphorylation; positive regulation of gene expression; response to toxic substance; cholesterol homeostasis; epoxide metabolic process; protein targeting to peroxisome; long-chain fatty acid biosynthetic process
Sources:Amigo / QuickGO
Orthologs
Databases	NCBI: entry; OMA: entry
Species	Human	Mouse
Entrez	2053	13850
Ensembl	ENSG00000120915	ENSMUSG00000022040
UniProt	P34913	P34914
RefSeq (mRNA)	NM_001979; NM_001256482; NM_001256483; NM_001256484	NM_001271402; NM_001271403; NM_001271421; NM_007940
RefSeq (protein)	NP_001243411; NP_001243412; NP_001243413; NP_001970	NP_001258331; NP_001258332; NP_001258350; NP_031966
Location (UCSC)	Chr 8: 27.49 – 27.55 Mb	Chr 14: 66.32 – 66.36 Mb
PubMed search
- Wikidata
View/Edit Human	View/Edit Mouse

Soluble epoxide hydrolase (sEH) is a bifunctional enzyme that in humans is encoded by the EPHX2 gene. sEH is a member of the epoxide hydrolase family. This enzyme, found in both the cytosol and peroxisomes, binds to specific epoxides and converts them to the corresponding diols. A different region of this protein also has lipid-phosphate phosphatase activity. Mutations in the EPHX2 gene have been associated with familial hypercholesterolemia.

== Tissue distribution ==
While most highly expressed in the liver, sEH is also expressed in other tissues including vascular endothelium, leukocytes, red blood cells, smooth muscle cells, adipocytes and the kidney proximal tubule. In the human brain, the enzyme is distributed widely, mostly in neuronal cell bodies, as well as in astrocytes and oligodendrocytes.

== Catalyzed reactions ==
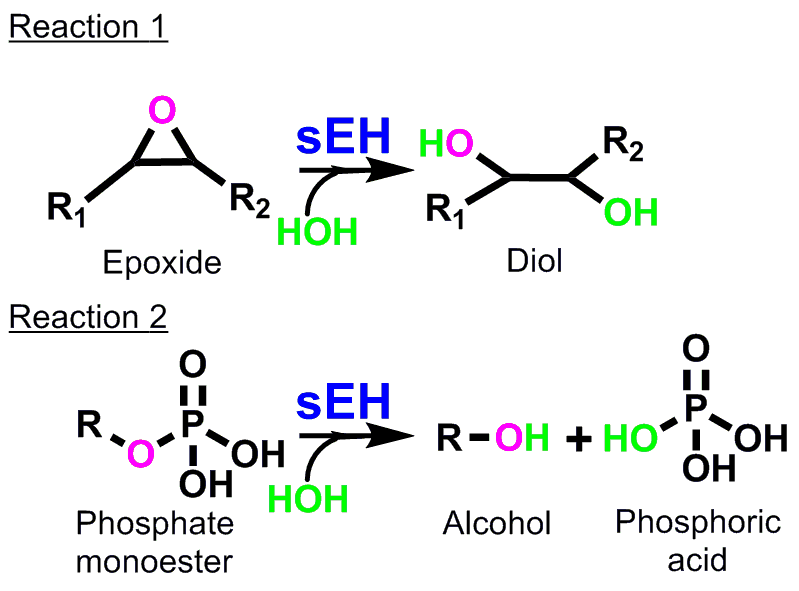
Reactions catalyzed by soluble epoxide hydrolase

The form of sEH in the intracellular environment is a homodimer with two distinct activities in two separate structural domains of each monomer: the C-terminal epoxide hydrolase activity (soluble epoxide hydrolase: EC 3.3.2.10) and the N-terminal phosphatase activity (lipid-phosphate phosphatase: EC 3.1.3.76). sEH converts epoxides, or three membered cyclic ethers, to their corresponding diols through the addition of a molecule of water. The resulting diols are more water-soluble than the parent epoxides, and so are more readily excreted by the organism.

The C-term-EH catalyzes the addition of water to an epoxide to yield a vicinal diol (reaction 1). The Nterm-phos hydrolyzes phosphate monoesters, such as lipid phosphates, to yield alcohols and phosphoric acid (reaction 2). The C-term-EH hydrolyzes one important class of lipid signaling molecules that includes many epoxyeicosatrienoic acids (EETs) that have vasoactive, anti-inflammatory and analgesic properties.

sEH also appears to be the hepoxilin hydrolase that is responsible for inactivating the epoxyalcohol metabolites of arachidonic acid, hepoxilin A3 and hepoxilin B3.

== Discovery ==
The sEH was first identified in the cytosolic fraction of mouse liver through its activity on epoxide containing substrates such as juvenile hormone and lipid epoxides such as epoxystearate. The soluble EH activity was shown to be distinct from that of the microsomal epoxide hydrolase (mEH) previously discovered with a different substrate selectivity and cellular localization than the mEH. Studies using a lipid epoxide as a substrate detected this activity in the soluble fraction of multiple organs, though at a lesser amount than in liver and kidney. The enzyme activity was detected in rabbits, mice and rats, and humans, and it is now believed to be ubiquitous in vertebrates. The proposed enzyme was first named cytosolic epoxide hydrolase; however, after its discovery inside the peroxisomes of some organs, it was renamed soluble epoxide hydrolase or sEH.

== Function ==
sEH has a restricted substrate selectivity, and has not been shown to hydrolyze any toxic or mutagenic xenobiotics. Conversely, the sEH plays a major role in the in vivo metabolism of endogenous lipid epoxides, such as the EETs and squalene oxide, a key intermediate in the synthesis of cholesterol. EETs are lipid signaling molecules that function in an autocrine and paracrine manner. They are produced when arachidonic acid is metabolized by cytochrome p450s (CYPs). These enzymes epoxidize the double bonds in arachidonic acid to form four regioisomers. Arachidonic acid is also the precursor of the prostaglandins and the leukotrienes, which are produced by cyclooxygenases and lipoxygenases, respectively. These lipids play a role in asthma, pain, and inflammation and are the targets of several pharmaceuticals. The EET receptor or receptors have not been identified, but several tools for the study of EET biology have been developed, these include small molecule sEH inhibitors, EET mimics and sEH genetic models. Through the use of these tools, as well as the EETs themselves, the EETs have been found to have anti-inflammatory and vasoactive properties. Several disease models have been used, including Ang-II induced hypertension and surgical models of brain and heart ischemia. In vitro models such as isolated coronary rings and platelet aggregation assays have also been employed.

The proposed role of sEH in the regulation of hypertension can be used as a simple model of sEH function in the kidney. Here the EETs are vasodilatory, and can be thought of as balancing other vasoconstrictive signals. sEH hydrolyzes the EETs to form the dihydroxyeicosatrienoic acids (DHETs). These molecules are more water-soluble and are more easily metabolized by other enzymes, so the vasodilatory signal is removed from the site of action through excretion, tipping the balance of vasoconstrictive and vasodilatory signals towards vasoconstriction. This change in the lipid signaling increases vascular resistance to blood flow and blood pressure. By reducing sEH epoxide hydrolase activity, and thereby shutting off the major route of metabolism of the EETs, the levels of these molecules can be stabilized or increased, increasing blood flow and reducing hypertension. This reduction in sEH activity can be achieved in genetic models in which sEH has been knocked out, or through the use of small molecule sEH inhibitors.

This simplified model is complicated by a number of factors in vivo. The EETs display different properties in different vascular beds. The DHETs are more readily excreted, but they have yet to be fully characterized, and may possess biological properties themselves, complicating the balance of signals described in the simplified model. There are epoxides of other lipids besides arachidonic acid such as the omega three docosahexaenoic acid (DHA) and eicosapentaenoic acid (EPA) epoxides. These lipid epoxides have been shown to have biological effects in vitro in which they inhibit platelet aggregation. In fact, in some assays they are more potent than the EETs. Other epoxidized lipids include the 18-carbon leukotoxin and isoleukotoxin. The diepoxide of linoleic acid can form tetrahydrofuran diols,

sEH metabolizes the biologically active epoxyalcohol metabolites of arachidonic acid, hepoxilin A3 (8-hydroxy-11S,12Sepoxy-(5Z,8Z,14Z)-eicosatrienoic acid) to trioxilin A3 (8,11,12-trihydroxy-(5Z,9E,14Z)-eicosatrienoic acid) and hepoxilin B3 (10-hydroxy-11S,12Sepoxy-(5Z,9E,14Z)-eicosatrienoic acid) to trioxilin B3 (10,11,12-trihydroxy-(5Z,9E,14Z)-eicosatrienoic acid. These trihydroxy products are generally considered to be inactive and the sEH pathway is generally considered to limit the actions of the hepoxilins.

The phosphatase activity of sEH has been shown to hydrolyze in vitro lipid phosphates such as terpene pyrophosphates or lysophosphatidic acids. Studies suggest a potential role of sEH in regulating cholesterol biosynthesis and metabolism in the brain. If the N-terminal domain of sEH is regulating cholesterol metabolism, it emplies that higher levels of its phosphatase activity could potentially increase brain cholesterol concentrations. However, its biological role is still unknown.

== Clinical significance ==
Through metabolism of EETs and other lipid mediators, sEH plays a role in several diseases, including hypertension, cardiac hypertrophy, arteriosclerosis, brain and heart ischemia/reperfusion injury, cancer and pain. Because of its possible role in cardiovascular and other diseases, sEH is being pursued as a pharmacological target, and potent small molecule inhibitors are available.

Because of the implications to human health, sEH has been pursued as a pharmaceutical target and several sEH inhibitors have been developed in the private and public sectors. One such inhibitor, UC1153 (AR9281), was taken to a phase IIA clinal trial for treatment of hypertension by Arête Therapeutics. However, UC1153 failed the clinical trial, due in large part because of its poor pharmacokinetic properties. Since this trial, a different sEH inhibitor, GSK2256294, developed for chronic obstructive pulmonary disease by GlaxoSmithKline has entered the pre-recruiting phase of a phase I clinical trial for obese male smokers. EicOsis designs and applies sEH inhibitors towards treating chronic pain in humans, companion animals and horses. The inhibitor EC1728 has been shown to successfully treat equine laminitis and alleviate inflammatory pain in dogs and cats and is currently undergoing clinical trials in horses. The sEH inhibitor EC5026 has been selected as the therapeutic for diabetic neuropathy and recently entered Phase 1 clinical trials. Thus, interest continues in sEH as a therapeutic target. Another drug described as a small-molecule thrombolytic with multiple mechanisms of action, SMTP-7, has been found to act as a sEH inhibitor, but is still at early experimental stages.

One indication of the possible therapeutic value of sEH inhibition comes from studies examining physiologically relevant single nucleotide polymorphisms (SNPs) of sEH in human populations. The Coronary Artery Risk Development in Young Adults (CARDIA) and the Atherosclerosis Risk in Communities (ARIC) studies both associated SNPs in the sEH coding region with coronary heart disease. In these studies, two nonsynonymous SNPs were identified, R287Q and K55R. R287Q changes the arginine in position 287 in the most frequent allele to glutamine, while K55R changes the lysine in position 55 to an arginine. R287Q was associated with coronary artery calcification in African American population participating in the CARDIA study. The K55R allele is associated with the risk of developing coronary heart disease in Caucasians participating in the ARIC study, where it was also associated with a higher risk of hypertension and ischemic stroke in male homozygotes.
