= Nordoxepin =

Active metabolite of antidepressant drug doxepin

Clinical data
- Other names: N-Desmethyldoxepin; Desmethyldoxepin; Demethyldoxepin; Monodesmethyldoxepin

Pharmacokinetic data
- Elimination half-life: 31 hours

Identifiers
- IUPAC name: (E/Z)-3-(Dibenzo[b,e]oxepin-11(6H)-ylidene)-N-methylpropan-1-amine
- CAS Number: 1225-56-5 2887-91-4 (hydrochloride) 67035-76-1 ((E)-nordoxepin)) 58534-46-6 ((Z)-nordoxepin)
- PubChem CID: 4535
- ChemSpider: 4376
- UNII: F498JSH8RR
- ChEBI: CHEBI:141547
- CompTox Dashboard (EPA): DTXSID9075406

Chemical and physical data
- Formula: C_{18}H_{19}NO
- Molar mass: 265.356 g·mol^{−1}
- 3D model (JSmol): Interactive image
- SMILES: CNCCC=C1C2=CC=CC=C2COC3=CC=CC=C31
- InChI: InChI=1S/C18H19NO/c1-19-12-6-10-16-15-8-3-2-7-14(15)13-20-18-11-5-4-9-17(16)18/h2-5,7-11,19H,6,12-13H2,1H3; Key:HVKCEFHNSNZIHO-UHFFFAOYSA-N

Nordoxepin, also known as N-desmethyldoxepin, is an organic compound. A colorless solid, it attracted attention as the major active metabolite of the tricyclic antidepressant (TCA) doxepin (Sinequan). It has been found to play a significant role in the antidepressant effects of doxepin.

Nordoxepin is a mixture of (E) and (Z) stereoisomers. Whereas pharmaceutical doxepin is supplied in an approximate 17:3 ratio mixture of (E)- and (Z)-stereoisomers and plasma concentrations of doxepin remain roughly the same as this ratio with treatment, plasma levels of the (E)- and (Z)-stereoisomers of nordoxepin, due to stereoselective metabolism of doxepin by cytochrome P450 enzymes, are approximately 1:1.

Nordoxepin is pharmacologically active similarly to doxepin. In general, the demethylated variants of tertiary amine TCAs like doxepin are much more potent norepinephrine reuptake inhibitors, less potent serotonin reuptake inhibitors, and less potent in their antiadrenergic, antihistamine, and anticholinergic activities.

Nordoxepin is formed from doxepin mainly by CYP2C19 (>50% contribution), while CYP1A2 and CYP2C9 are involved to a lesser extent, and CYP2D6 and CYP3A4 are not involved. Hydroxylation of doxepin and nordoxepin is mediated mainly by CYP2D6. Total exposures to both doxepin and nordoxepin differ by almost 10-fold in CYP2D6 ultra-rapid versus poor metabolizers. Both doxepin and nordoxepin are also transformed into glucuronide conjugates. The elimination half-life of nordoxepin is approximately 31 hours, which is almost twice that of doxepin (mean 17 hours).

== See also ==
- Cidoxepin
