= C19H21NO =

The molecular formula C_{19}H_{21}NO (molar mass: 279.38 g/mol, exact mass: 279.1623 u) may refer to:

- Cidoxepin
- Doxepin
