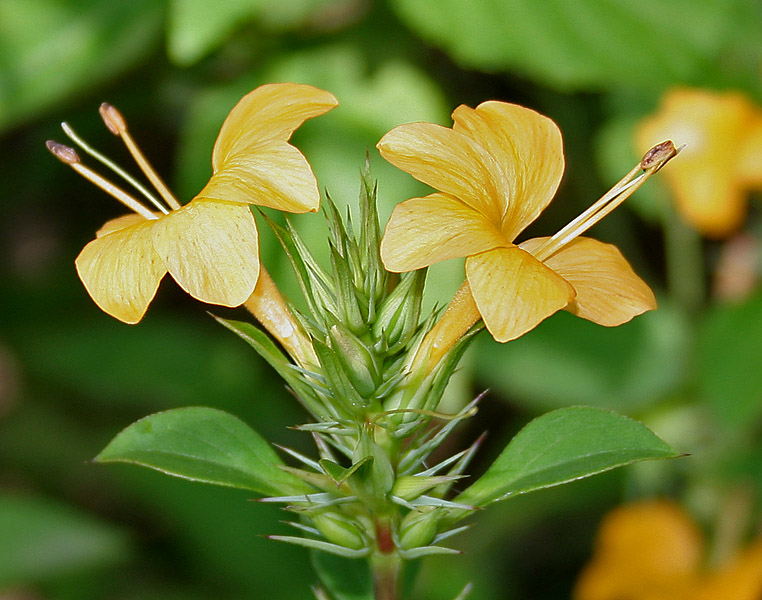
- Barleria prionitis in Hyderabad, India.

Scientific classification
- Kingdom: Plantae
- Clade: Tracheophytes
- Clade: Angiosperms
- Clade: Eudicots
- Clade: Asterids
- Order: Lamiales
- Family: Acanthaceae
- Genus: Barleria
- Species: B. prionitis

Binomial name
- Barleria prionitis L.

Synonyms
- Barleria echinata St.-Lag.; B. hystrix L.; B. prionitis var. pubescens Kuntze; B. quadrispinosa Stokes; B. spicata Roxb.; Prionitis hystrix (L.) Miq.; P. pubiflora Miq.

= Barleria prionitis =

Species of flowering plant

Barleria prionitis is a shrub in the family Acanthaceae, native to Island and Mainland Southeast Asia, China, the Indian Subcontinent, the Arabian Peninsula and northeastern Africa. It is widely spread as an ornamental and weed, occurring in naturalised populations around the world. It used not only as an ornamental but also as a hedge and extensively as a component of folk medicines. As a weed it is regarded as problematic in many areas.

== Description ==
A much-branched shrub up to 1.8m tall, the lower leaf axils have spines 1–2 cm in length, one of the specific features of this Barleria. The stem and branches are terete, smooth, lenticellate and glabrous. The leaves are elliptic to ovate (4-10.5 × 1.8-5.5 cm) with both surfaces pubescent when young but becoming glabrescent soon. The large golden-yellow flowers are clustered in the axils of the upper leaves and/or on bracts. Apically spinose calyx lobes and a yellowish to orange corolla are used to distinguish this species from other Barleria. In Zhōngguó/China, flowers appear October to December, while fruiting occurs from December to February, while in Pakistan there is all year flowering. The Australian flowering and fruiting times are trimodal, from March to June, August to October and December.

The subspecies pubiflora (see Taxonomy, below) is separated from the nominate subspecies by having longer anthers (5mm or more) and corolla (4.5–7 cm) and larger leaves (up to 17 x 5.5 cm).

== Taxonomy ==
The plant was described by Carl Linnaeus in his fundamental work Species Plantarum in 1753.

There are three accepted subspecies of B. prionitis L., these were described in 1983.:

- B. p. subsp. appressa (Forssk.) Brummitt & J.R.I.Wood
- B. p. subsp. induta (C.B.Clarke) Brummitt & J.R.I.Wood
- B. p. subsp. pubiflora (Benth. ex Hohen.) Brummitt & J.R.I.Wood

The appressa subspecies has the following synonyms: Barleria appressa (Forssk.) Deflers; Justicia appressa Forssk.

The subspecies induta has the following synonyms: Barleria horrida Buscal. & Muschl.; B. induta C.B.Clarke

== Distribution ==
The nominate subspecies is native to areas of Island and Mainland Southeast Asia, Zhōngguó/China, and the Indian subcontinent as far west as Pakistan. The countries/divisions in which it is present are Indonesia (Maluku, Nusa Tenggara, Bali, Sulawesi, Jawa), Philippines, Peninsular Malaysia, Zhōngguó/China (Yunnan), Vietnam, Thailand, Laos, Myanmar (Kachin, Magway, Mandalay, Sagaing, & Yangon), Bangladesh, India (Nicobar Islands, Assam, Laccadive Islands), the West Himalaya region, Sri Lanka, Maldives, and Pakistan.

It has been naturalised in: Nauru, Australia (Top End of the Northern Territory, northern Western Australia), Andaman Islands, Rodrigues, Mauritius, Réunion, Seychelles, Leeward Islands, Windward Islands, Puerto Rico, and Jamaica.

There is uncertainty that the plant is native to, naturalised to, or cultivated in the following regions: Sudan, Kenya, Tanzania, Angola, Mozambique, Malawi, Botswana, Namibia, South Africa (KwaZulu-Natal, Transvaal), and Madagascar.

Restricted to the area of western India (coastal and subcoastal areas, Himalayan foothills and eastern Punjab) and southeast Pakistan, the subspecies Barleria prionitis subsp. pubiflora has a much more limited native region.

The subspecies Barleria prionitis subsp. appressa is native to Saudi Arabia and Yemen.

Northern Ethiopia and Eritrea are regions which the subspecies Barleria prionitis subsp. induta is native to.

== Habitat and ecology ==
Some of the habitats in which the shrub is found include roadsides, thickets, and dry places in evergreen broad-leaved forests. It occurs up to 600 m. In Myanmar the shrub favours fields and pastures.

A fast growing perennial plant widely commercialized as an ornamental, B. prionitis in many tropical areas has frequently escaped and grown as a weed in disturbed areas, forest edges, rocky outcrops, near streams, along roads, and in overgrazed pastures. It able to grow in a wide range of climates and soil types and is adapted to grow in open, full sunny areas and in highly disturbed sites as well as understory of secondary forests. It has great dispersal capability, spreading sexually by seeds and vegetatively by stem fragments. The shrub has potential to cause economic and environmental damage in that it formins dense thickets that displace native vegetation, prevent revegetation by native plants. Stock movement cam be impeded, waterway access restricted, and aesthetic values diminished. In Australia, the plant is on an alert list for environmental weeds, as it has the potential to seriously degrade ecosystems.

Barleria prionitis is often the host to larvae of the Phalanta phalantha and Junonia lemonias butterflies.

== Vernacular names ==
There are numerous common names of this plant, they include: aimatamutik (Tetum); landhek (Gili Iyang Island, Indonesia); landep (Sundanese), bungak landak (Malay); 黄花假杜鹃, huang hua jia du juan (Standard Chinese); leik-su-ywe, leik-hsu shwe, leik tha-shwe war (Myanmar); kukong manok (Tagalog); kuranta (Sanskrit); vjradanti, वज्रदंती (Marathi), Kannada: ಗೋರಟೆ Tamil: சுள்ளி மலர்;, Mulla gorinta(ముళ్ళగోరింట, Telugu), മഞ്ഞക്കനകാംബരം (Malayalam); jhinti katsareya (India); khussara, kala bansa (Pakistan); barrelière prionite, herbe tac-tac, jasmin des Indes, picanier jaune (French); Drachenfänger (German language); espinosa amarilla (Spanish); porcupine flower (US English); barleria, dog bush (English), yellow hedge barleria;

== Uses ==
In Pakistan shrubs are grown as a hedge while its bitter quinine-like extract is used in traditional medicine to treat whooping cough and tuberculosis.

It occurs widely as an ornamental plant.

It is used in Indonesia as a component in traditional medicines (obat). Tetum people in Belu, west Timor use the leaves to treat infected wounds. On small Gili Iyang Island, to the northeast of Jawa, the plant is used to treat toothache.

Parts of the plant are bitter, astringent in taste, and are regarded in Myanmar as highly beneficial for skin, blood and other diseases. Often combined with sesame oil and fermented-rice washing-water, the whole plant, leaves (sometimes burnt to ash or crushed for juice), stems, branches, and roots are used together or separately.

In India the root is placed on boils and glandular swellings; the bark is used for dropsy; and the leaf for toothache and rheumatism.

It is used for various medicinal purposes in ayurvedic medicine. The juice of the leaves is applied to feet to prevent maceration and cracking in the monsoon season.

Its leaves are known to contain 6-Hydroxyflavone, one of the chemical compounds that is a noncompetitive inhibitor of the protein cytochrome P450 2C9.

== History ==
The shrub has been intentionally introduced in many areas to be used as an ornamental, hedge plant, and as a medicinal herb. In the West Indies, it was introduced around the 1900s and it appears in herbarium collections made in 1906 in Barbados and 1910 in Jamaica. In Australia, it was first recorded in the Northern Territory in 1963, it was declared a noxious environmental weed in 2001.

== Literature ==
Works discussing the species include:

- Acevedo-Rodríguez, P. & Strong, M.T. (2012). Catalogue of seed plants of the West Indies Smithsonian Contributions to Botany 98: 1–1192.
- Adams, C. 1972. Flowering plants of Jamaica
- Aldén, B., S. Ryman, & M. Hjertson. 2012. Svensk Kulturväxtdatabas, SKUD (Swedish Cultivated and Utility Plants Database; online resource) www.skud.info
- Arnold, T. H. & B. C. De Wet, eds. 1993. Plants of southern Africa: names and distribution. Mem. Bot. Surv. S. Africa no. 62
- Babu, C. R. 1977. Herbaceous flora of Dehra Dun.
- Backer, C. A. & R. C. Bakhuizen van den Brink, Jr. 1963–1968. Flora of Java.
- Balkrishna, A. (2018). Flora of Morni Hills (Research & Possibilities): 1–581. Divya Yoga Mandir Trust.
- Bosser, J. & al. (eds.) (2000). Flore des Mascareignes 127-135: 1. IRD Éditions, MSIRI, RBG-Kew, Paris.
- Collenette, S. (1999). Wildflowers of Saudi Arabia: 1–799. National commission for wildlife conservation and development (NCWCD), Kingdom of Saudi Arabia.
- Cufodontis, G. 1953–1972. Enumeratio plantarum aethiopiae: Spermatophyta.
- Dassanayake, M. D. & F. R. Fosberg, eds. 1980-. A revised handbook to the flora of Ceylon.
- Erhardt, W. et al. 2008. Der große Zander: Enzyklopädie der Pflanzennamen
- Fosberg, F.R. (1957). The Maldive islands, Indian Ocean Atoll Research Bulletin 58: 1-37.
- Govaerts, R. (1996). World Checklist of Seed Plants 2(1, 2): 1–492. MIM, Deurne.
- Grierson, A. J. C. & D. J. Long. 1984-. Flora of Bhutan including a record of plants from Sikkim.
- Hooker, J. D. 1872–1897. Flora of British India
- Keay, R. W. J. & F. N. Hepper. 1953–1972. Flora of west tropical Africa, ed. 2.
- Kress, W.J., DeFilipps, R.A., Farr, E. & Kyi, D.Y.Y. (2003). A Checklist of the Trees, Shrubs, Herbs and Climbers of Myanmar Contributions from the United States National Herbarium 45: 1–590. Smithsonian Institution.
- Lê, T.C. (2005). Danh lục các loài thục vật Việt Nam [Checklist of Plant Species of Vietnam] 3: 1–1248. Hà Noi : Nhà xu?t b?n Nông nghi?p.
- McGuffin, M., J. T. Kartesz, A. Y. Leung, & A. O. Tucker. 2000. Herbs of commerce, ed. 2 American Herbal Products Association, Silver Spring, Maryland.
- Matthew, K. M. 1983. The flora of the Tamil Nadu Carnatic.
- Meena, S.L. (2012). A checklist of the vascular plants of Banaskantha district, Gujarat, India Nelumbo 54: 39–91.
- Merrill, E. D. 1922–1926. An enumeration of Philippine flowering plants.
- Nasir, E. & S. I. Ali, eds. 1970-. Flora of [West] Pakistan.
- Newman, M., Ketphanh, S., Svengsuksa, B., Thomas, P., Sengdala, K., Lamxay, V. & Armstrong, K. (2007). A checklist of the vascular plants of Lao PDR: 1–394. Royal Botanic Gardens, Edinburgh.
- Ningombam, D.S. (2014). The family Acanthaceae for the flora of Manipur: 1–115. LAP Lambert academic publishing.
- Oliver, D. et al., eds. v. 1–3, & W. T. Thiselton Dyer et al., eds. v. 4–10. 1868–1937. Flora of tropical Africa.
- Pandey, R.P. & Dilwakar, P.G. (2008). An integrated check-list flora of Andaman and Nicobar islands, India Journal of Economic and Taxonomic Botany 32: 403–500.
- Ananda Rao, T. & Ellis, J.L. (1995). Flora of Lakshadweep islands off the Malabar coast, peninsular India, with emphasis on phytogeographical distribution of plants Journal of Economic and Taxonomic Botany 19: 235–250.
- Rehm, S. 1994. Multilingual dictionary of agronomic plants
- Shaheen, H., Qureshi, R., Akram, A., Gulfraz, M. & Potter, D. (2014). A preliminary floristic checklist of Thal desert Punjab, Pakistan. Pakistan Journal of Botany 46: 13–18.
- Shendage, S.M. & Yadav, S.R. (2010). Revision of the genus Barleria (Acanthaceae) in India Rheedea 20: 81–130.
- Sikarwar, R.L.S. (2014). Angiosperm diversity assessment of Chitrakootthe legendary place of Vindhyan range, India Journal of Economic and Taxonomic Botany 38: 563–619.
- Stewart, R. 1972. An annotated catalogue of the vascular plants of West Pakistan and Kashmir
- Thaman, R.R., Fosberg, F.R., Manner, H.I. & Hassall, D.C. (1994). The Flora of Nauru Atoll Research Bulletin 392: 1–223.
- Turner, I.M. (1995). A catalogue of the Vascular Plants of Malaya Gardens' Bulletin Singapore 47(1): 1–346.
- Wu, Z. & Raven, P.H. (eds.) (2011). Flora of China 19: 1–884. Science Press (Beijing) & Missouri Botanical Garden Press (St. Louis).

Works discussing the subspecies appressa include:

- Collenette, S. (1999). Wildflowers of Saudi Arabia: 1–799. National commission for wildlife conservation and development (NCWCD), Kingdom of Saudi Arabia.
- Govaerts, R. (1996). World Checklist of Seed Plants 2(1, 2): 1–492. MIM, Deurne.
- Wood, J.R.I. (1997). A handbook of the Yemen Flora: 1–434. Royal Botanic Gardens, Kew.

A work discussing the subspecies induta is:

- Govaerts, R. (1996). World Checklist of Seed Plants 2(1, 2): 1–492. MIM, Deurne.

Works discussing the subspecies pubiflora include:

- Govaerts, R. (1996). World Checklist of Seed Plants 2(1, 2): 1–492. MIM, Deurne.
- Shendage, S.M. & Yadav, S.R. (2010). Revision of the genus Barleria (Acanthaceae) in India Rheedea 20: 81–130.

== Gallery ==
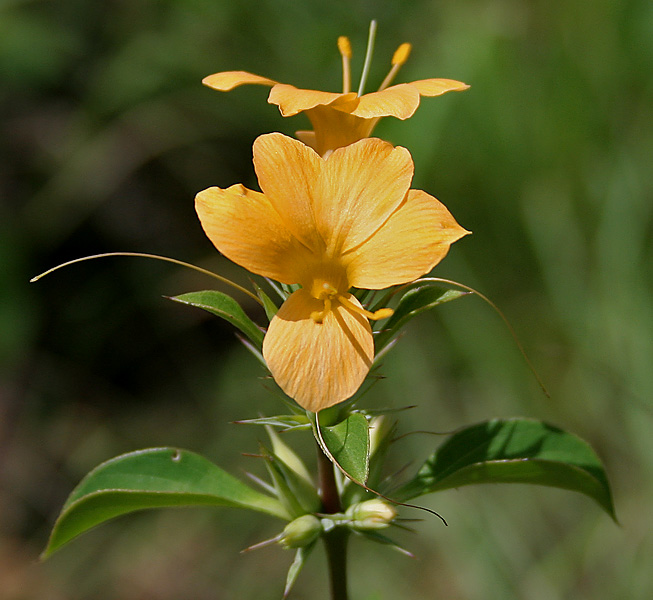
Barleria prionitis in Hyderabad, India.

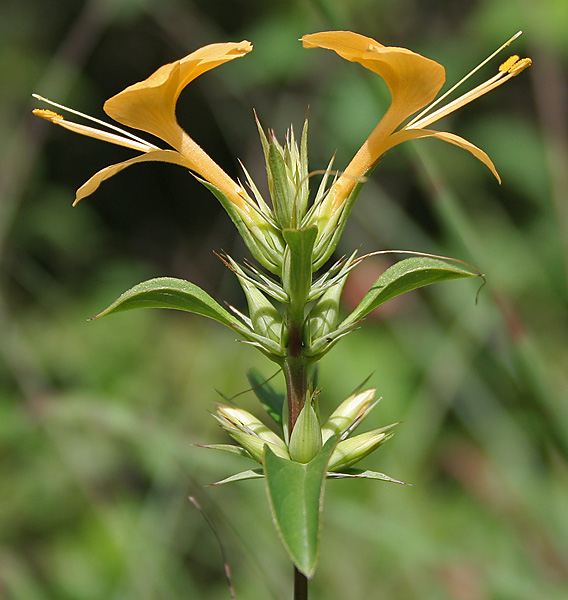
Barleria prionitis in Hyderabad, India.

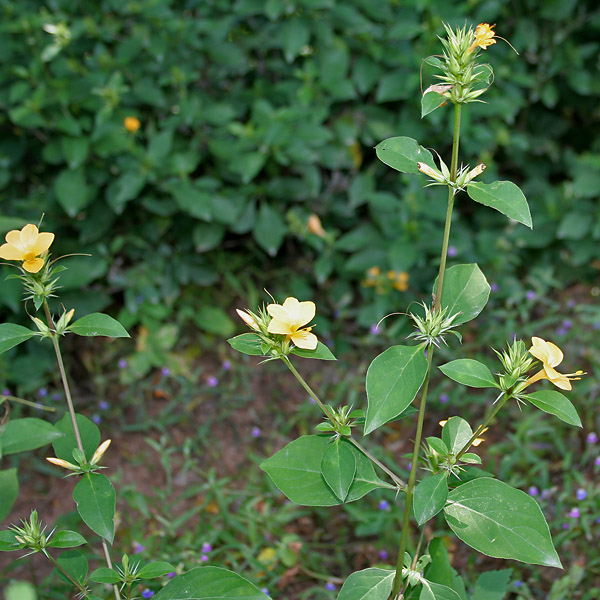
Barleria prionitis in Hyderabad, India.

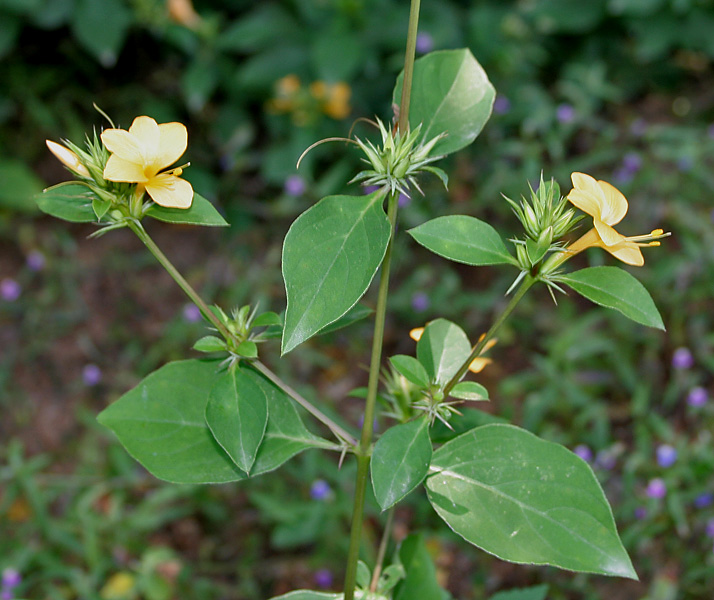
Barleria prionitis in Hyderabad, India.
