= Pharmacogene Variation Consortium =

PharmVar

Content
- Description: The PharmVar Consortium
- Data types captured: Pharmacogenomics and Pharmacogenetics
- Organisms: Human

Contact
- Research center: Children's Mercy Hospital
- Primary citation: PMID 29134625
- Release date: 2017

Access
- Website: www.pharmvar.org
- Download URL: www.pharmvar.org/download
- Web service URL: www.pharmvar.org/documentation

Miscellaneous
- Curation policy: Yes

Pharmacogene Variation Consortium (abbreviated as PhamVar) is an international group of experts that maintains a systematic nomenclature system for allelic variations of genes that affect the metabolism of drugs.

The database is focused on cytochrome P450 enzymes, but is being expanded into other classes of enzymes. The original nomenclature was maintained by the Human CYP Allele Nomenclature Database. However PhamVar took over this function in 2017.

== See also ==
- PharmGKB
- pharmacogenetics
- pharmacogenomics
- pharmacokinetics
- pharmacodynamics
- Clinical Pharmacogenetics Implementation Consortium
