= Bergaptol =

Names
- Preferred IUPAC name 4-Hydroxy-7H-furo[3,2-g][1]benzopyran-7-one
- Other names 5-Hydroxypsoralen, 5-Hydroxyfuranocoumarin

Identifiers
| CAS Number | 486-60-2 |
| 3D model (JSmol) | Interactive image |
| ChemSpider | 4444066 |
| ECHA InfoCard | 100.230.572 |
| PubChem CID | 5280371 |
| UNII | KTC8ANI30F |
| CompTox Dashboard (EPA) | DTXSID40197564 |
- InChI: InChI=1S/C11H6O4/c12-10-2-1-6-9(15-10)5-8-7(11(6)13)3-4-14-8/h1-5,13H Key: GIJHDGJRTUSBJR-UHFFFAOYSA-N
- SMILES: O=C\1Oc3c(/C=C/1)c(O)c2ccoc2c3

Properties
| Chemical formula | C_{11}H_{6}O_{4} |
| Molar mass | 202.165 g·mol^{−1} |
- Except where otherwise noted, data are given for materials in their standard state (at 25 °C [77 °F], 100 kPa). Infobox references

Bergaptol is a natural furanocoumarin with the molecular formula C_{11}H_{6}O_{4}. It is found in the essential oils of citrus including lemon and bergamot.

== Research ==
Bergaptol is researched for anti-inflammatory, antioxidant, anti-cancer, anti-osteoporosis, anti-microbial, and anti-lipidemic properties.

Bergaptol inhibits cytochrome P450 enzymes (CYP), particularly CYP2C9 and CYP3A4. This inhibition can impact the metabolism and concentrations of various drugs and toxins within the body. When compared to other coumarins, bergaptol demonstrates the lowest potency in inhibiting CYP3A4 specifically in cancer cells. Instead, it has the ability to suppress drug efflux transporters, such as P-glycoprotein, which can help overcome chemotherapeutic drug resistance.

Bergaptol exhibits strong antimicrobial effects and has a high potential for inhibiting quorum sensing, a process crucial for microbial communication and virulence.

In vivo studies have shown that bergaptol has a longer retention time in plasma compared to other coumarins.

Toxicity of bergaptol in humans has not been extensively studied and remains unclear.
