= 6-Hydroxyflavone =

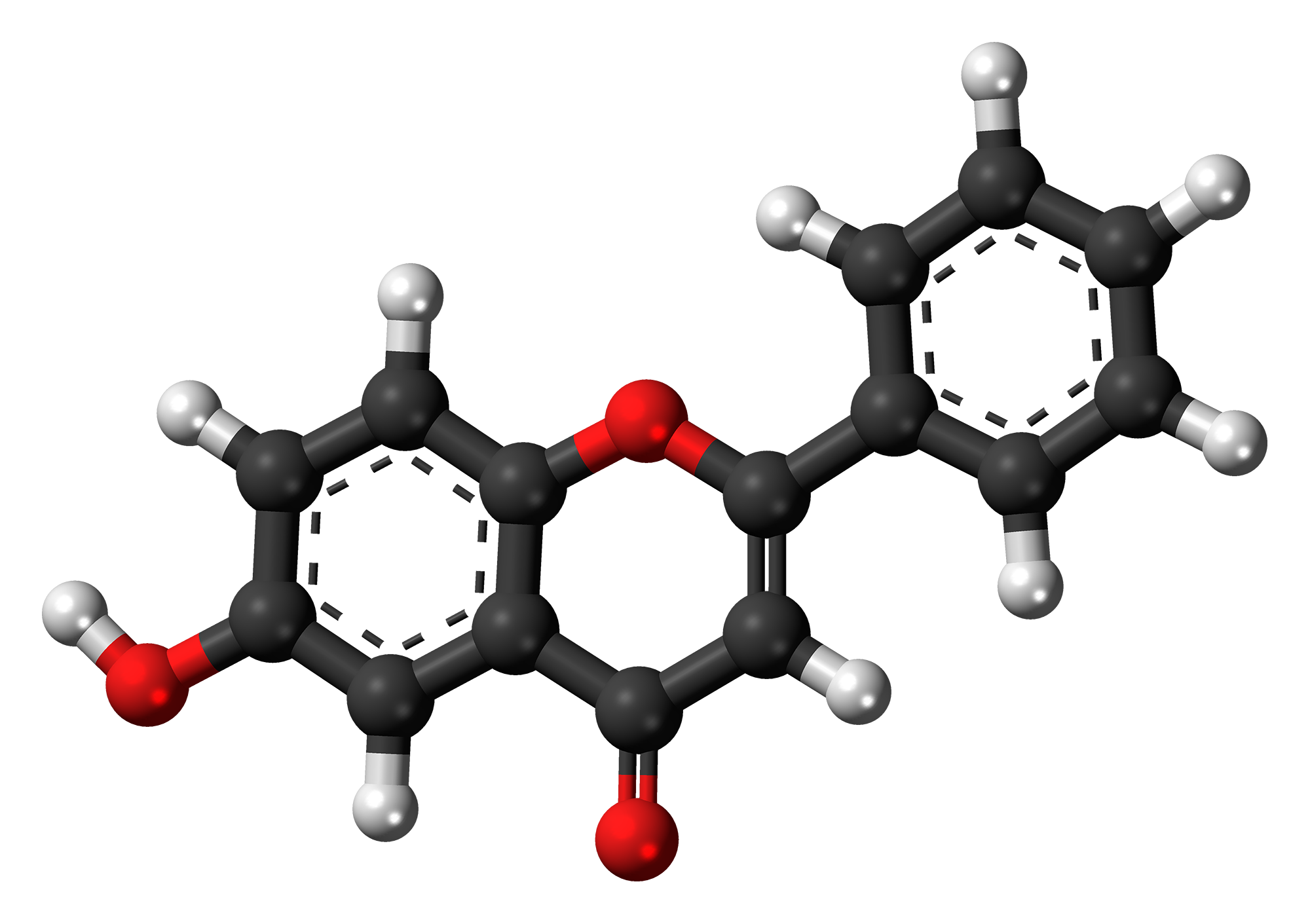

Names
- IUPAC name 6-Hydroxyflavone
- Systematic IUPAC name 6-Hydroxy-2-phenyl-4H-1-benzopyran-4-one
- Other names 6-Monohydroxyflavone; 6-Hydroxy-2-phenyl-4-benzopyrone

Identifiers
CAS Number	6665-83-4
3D model (JSmol)	Interactive image; Interactive image
ChEMBL	ChEMBL138649
ChemSpider	65233
ECHA InfoCard	100.027.005
EC Number	229-704-8
KEGG	C14137
PubChem CID	72279
UNII	148S6Z78H6
CompTox Dashboard (EPA)	DTXSID8022327
- InChI: InChI=1S/C15H10O3/c16-11-6-7-14-12(8-11)13(17)9-15(18-14)10-4-2-1-3-5-10/h1-9,16H Key: GPZYYYGYCRFPBU-UHFFFAOYSA-N
- SMILES: C1=CC=C(C=C1)C2=CC(=O)C3=C(O2)C=CC(=C3)O; O=C\1c3c(O/C(=C/1)c2ccccc2)ccc(O)c3

Properties
Chemical formula	C_{15}H_{10}O_{3}
Molar mass	238.242 g·mol^{−1}
Melting point	234 to 236 °C (453 to 457 °F; 507 to 509 K)
- Except where otherwise noted, data are given for materials in their standard state (at 25 °C [77 °F], 100 kPa). verify (what is ?) Infobox references

6-Hydroxyflavone is a flavone, a type of chemical compound. It is one of the noncompetitive inhibitors of cytochrome P450 2C9. It is reported in Crocus and leaves of Barleria prionitis Linn. (a common Acanthaceae from India). 6-Hydroxyflavone shows anxiolytic activity in a mouse model. Compared to the full agonist diazepam, 6-hydroxyflavone was approximately 200 times less potent.
