= PharmGKB =

Content
- Description: The Pharmacogenomics Knowledgebase
- Data types captured: Pharmacogenomics and Pharmacogenetics
- Organisms: Human

Contact
- Research center: Stanford University
- Primary citation: PMID 22992668
- Release date: 2000

Access
- Website: pharmgkb.org
- Download URL: pharmgkb.org/downloads
- Web service URL: api.pharmgkb.org

Miscellaneous
- License: Creative Commons BY-SA 4.0 www.pharmgkb.org/page/dataUsagePolicy
- Curation policy: Yes

The Pharmacogenomics Knowledgebase (PharmGKB) is a publicly available, online knowledge base responsible for the aggregation, curation, integration and dissemination of knowledge regarding the impact of human genetic variation on drug response. It is funded by the National Institutes of Health (NIH) National Institute of General Medical Sciences (NIGMS), and is a partner of the NIH Pharmacogenomics Research Network (PGRN). It has been managed at Stanford University since its inception in 2000.

== Purpose ==
The main goal of PharmGKB is to aid researchers in understanding how variation in a person’s genetic makeup affects how he or she responds to a drug, a field known as pharmacogenomics or pharmacogenetics (PGx). In order to achieve this goal, PharmGKB manually curates PGx information from the primary literature, and then stores it in the knowledge base. This information can be aggregated, allowing PharmGKB to identify consistent genetic variant-drug response interactions. Variant-drug interactions with a large amount of supporting evidence may then be considered for potential clinical implementation. In order to capitalize on cases where strong PGx literature evidence exists, PharmGKB cofounded the Clinical Pharmacogenetic Implementation Consortium (CPIC), an organization responsible for the creation and dissemination of peer-reviewed, freely available genotype-based drug-dosing guidelines for clinicians. PharmGKB also works with various international consortia groups, such as the International Warfarin Pharmacogenetics Consortium (IWPC) and the International Clopidogrel Pharmacogenomics Consortium (ICPC), facilitating collaboration and analysis of large PGx datasets.

== Content ==
PharmGKB has many different types of PGx-related information available through the website, discussed in the sections below. PharmGKB has PGx content on genetic variants (including single-nucleotide polymorphisms (SNPs) and haplotypes, as well as some copy number variations (CNVs) and indels), genes, drugs, phenotypes (including diseases and side effects) and PubMed IDs (PMIDs).

=== Variant Annotations ===
Variant annotations are summaries describing how a particular genetic polymophism is associated with a drug response, as reported in a single publication. Examples of drug responses include adverse drug reactions, changes in drug efficacy and alterations in how quickly or slowly a drug is metabolized. Curators review past and present literature and add any studies containing PGx-relevant results to the knowledge base through these variant annotations. The variant-drug associations may be negative or positive, and they come from a wide variety of study types, including genome-wide association studies, clinical trials, and functional in vitro studies. All variant annotations contain a standardized sentence, which allows results to be easily compared and contrasted between studies throughout the knowledge base. In addition to recording the genetic variant-drug phenotype association, key study parameters such as study size, population ethnicity, p-values and allele frequencies are also noted in the annotation

=== Clinical Annotations ===
Clinical annotations combine all variant annotations that discuss the same variant-drug phenotype association and bring them together into a single written summary of the association. Clinical annotations consist of summary text, which is written as the association for each genotype as compared to other genotypes. Below this summary text, clinical annotations contain a list of all the variant annotations that support this particular variant-drug phenotype association. Each clinical annotation is also given a level of evidence, providing a measure of confidence in the association. The level of evidence for a clinical annotation is manually assessed, and is based on criteria such as the number of studies finding positive versus negative results, p-values and study sizes:

- Level 1A: Clinical annotation for a variant-drug combination in a CPIC or medical society-endorsed PGx guideline, or implemented at a Pharmacogenomics Research Network (PGRN) site or in another major health system.
- Level 1B: Clinical annotation for a variant-drug combination where the preponderance of evidence shows an association. The association must be replicated in more than one cohort with significant p-values, and preferably will have a strong effect size.
- Level 2A: Clinical annotation for a variant-drug combination that qualifies for level 2B where the variant is within a Very Important Pharmacogene (VIP) as defined by PharmGKB. The variants in level 2A are in known pharmacogenes, so functional significance is more likely.
- Level 2B: Clinical annotation for a variant-drug combination with moderate evidence of an association. The association must be replicated but there may be some studies that do not show statistical significance, and/or the effect size may be small.
- Level 3: Annotation for a variant-drug combination based on a single significant (not yet replicated) or annotation for a variant-drug combination evaluated in multiple studies but lacking clear evidence of an association.
- Level 4: Annotation based on a case report, non-significant study or in vitro, molecular or functional assay evidence only.

=== Very Important Pharmacogene (VIP) summaries ===
VIPs are overviews of important genes involved in drug response. They are intended to provide users a better understanding of a particular PGx-relevant gene, and consist of background information on the gene, including any disease associations, and an in-depth review of its pharmacogenetics. Though VIPs are available on the PharmGKB website in an interactive format, they are also typically published in the journal Pharmacogenetics and Genomics. VIPs also provide links to summaries for particularly important variants within that gene – these are known as VIP Variant summaries.

=== Pathways ===
PharmGKB pathways are evidence-based diagrams detailing the pharmacokinetics (PK) or pharmacodynamics (PD) of a PGx-relevant drug, accompanied by text providing background on the drug and a discussion of its PK, PD and PGx. Pathways are typically published in the journal Pharmacogenetics and Genomics. Pathways are manually created after an extensive literature review, and the connections on the pathway diagrams are supported by literature citations; these supporting citations can be viewed in the online versions of the pathways. Additionally, the information contained within each pathway diagram is available for download in TSV, BioPAX and GPML formats.

=== Dosing guidelines ===
PharmGKB provides PGx-based drug dosing guidelines from CPIC, as well as The Royal Dutch Association for the Advancement of Pharmacy Pharmacogenetics Working Group (DWPG) and professional societies such as The American College of Rheumatology. More information about the DPWG and their objectives and methods can be found at the PharmGKB website.

==== CPIC ====
CPIC consists of members of NIH Pharmacogenomics Research Network (PGRN), PharmGKB staff, and experts in PGx and medicine. The goal of CPIC is to create freely-available, peer-reviewed drug-dosing guidelines for clinicians who have access to pre-emptive genetic testing results. CPIC guidelines are written for PGx associations that have substantial supporting evidence, such as the associations between HLA-B*58:01 and Stevens–Johnson syndrome/toxic epidermal necrolysis in patients taking allopurinol, and SLCO1B1 rs4149056 and myopathy in patients taking simvastatin CPIC guidelines are published in the journal Clinical Pharmacology & Therapeutics, and are also available through PharmGKB in an interactive format. CPIC dosing guidelines on PharmGKB include an excerpt from the published guideline, the therapeutic dosing recommendations in a table format, and PDF versions of the guideline and supplement. PharmGKB also provides a dosing guideline tool, where users can enter in a genotype of interest and receive the relevant dosing recommendation. Downloadable, computable versions of the guidelines in JSON format are also available on PharmGKB.

=== FDA and EMA drug labels ===
PharmGKB curates and annotates drug labels containing PGx information from both the U.S. Food and Drug Administration (FDA) and the European Medicines Agency (EMA). FDA-approved drug labels with PGx information are sourced from the FDA’s Table of Pharmacogenomic Biomarkers in Drug Labels page, or identified by curators. EMA-approved drug labels (known as European Public Assessment Reports (EPARs)) are manually searched for using the drugs in the FDA Biomarker table. PharmGKB tags each FDA or EMA label with a PGx level based on internally created guidelines:

- Genetic testing required: The label states or implies that some sort of gene, protein or chromosomal testing, including genetic testing, functional protein assays, cytogenetic studies, etc., should be conducted before using this drug. This requirement may only be for a particular subset of patients. PharmGKB considers labels that state the variant is an indication for the drug, as implying a test requirement. If the label states a test "should be" performed, this is also interpreted as a requirement.
- Genetic testing recommended: The label states or implies that some sort of gene, protein or chromosomal testing, including genetic testing, functional protein assays, cytogenetic studies, etc., is recommended before using this drug. This recommendation may only be for a particular subset of patients. PharmGKB considers labels that say testing "should be considered" to be recommending testing.
- Actionable PGx: The label does not discuss genetic or other testing for gene/protein/chromosomal variants, but does contain information about changes in efficacy, dosage or toxicity due to such variants. The label may mention contraindication of the drug in a particular subset of patients but does not require or recommend gene, protein or chromosomal testing.
- Informative PGx: The label mentions a gene or protein is involved in the metabolism or pharmacodynamics of the drug, but there is no information to suggest that variation in these genes/proteins leads to different response.

== See also ==
- pharmacogenetics
- pharmacogenomics
- pharmacokinetics
- pharmacodynamics
- Pharmacogene Variation Consortium
- Clinical Pharmacogenetics Implementation Consortium
