= Clinical Pharmacogenetics Implementation Consortium =

International research association

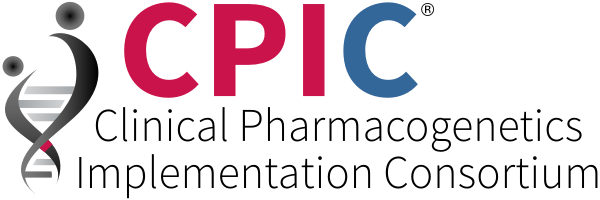
Clinical Pharmacogenetics Implementation Consortium logo

The Clinical Pharmacogenetics Implementation Consortium (CPIC) is an international consortium including members of NIH Pharmacogenomics Research Network (PGRN), PharmGKB staff, and experts in PGx and medicine, who are committed to facilitating the use of pharmacogenetic tests to improve patient care.

== See also ==
- pharmacogenetics
- pharmacogenomics
- pharmacokinetics
- pharmacodynamics
- PharmGKB
- Pharmacogene Variation Consortium
