= Toxgnostics =

Toxgnostics is part of personalized medicine as it describes the guiding principles for the discovery of pharmacogenomic biomarker tests, also referred to as companion diagnostic tests, which identify if an individual patient is likely to suffer severe drug toxicity from treatment with a specific therapeutic agent. Once at-risk individuals are identified, drug toxicity can be prevented using elective dose reduction or prescription of a different medication.

== Background ==
The majority of toxgnostic studies have been candidate gene studies restricted to the known Absorption, Distribution, Metabolism, and Excretion genes (ADME) of drug treated patients. The PharmaADME consortium identified 32 core genes containing 184 variants within common pathways that should be included in ADME candidate gene studies of toxicity biomarkers. Toxicity biomarkers that have been clinically validated using this restricted panel of genes include the P450 cytochrome assay that is currently recommended for routine clinical use of the oral anticoagulant warfarin. Using next-generation sequencing methods and genome-wide association studies a more comprehensive toxgnostic approach can be utilized through unbiased analysis of several million variants across the whole human genome, including introns and exons, for pharmacogenomic markers of drug induced toxicity.

Cancer drugs have been highlighted as particularly appropriate candidates for toxgnostic studies due to the significant toxicity profiles associated with both targeted therapies and chemotherapy. Most cancer patients obtain only modest benefit from treatment, whereas toxicity is common and often associated with severe side effects which include considerable morbidity and mortality. One of the most commonly used chemotherapy drugs 5-fluorouracil (5FU) prescribed as adjuvant therapy following surgical resection of early stage colorectal cancer benefits only approx. 4% of patients, whereas 30–40% of those treated will suffer severe toxicity such as neutropenia, mucositis, hand-foot syndrome, diarrhoea, and stomatitis, fatal toxicities will kill 0.5-1% of people treated. Through the use of toxgnostic screens a number of genetic variants have now been identified that can be used to predict 5FU toxicity prior to treatment. These genetic variants can be used to identify the individuals predisposed to severe drug toxicity and the dose of 5FU chemotherapy can be reduced to prevent severe toxic side effects. Glioblastoma patients treated with temozolomide an oral alkylating chemotherpay agent experience temozolomide-related myelotoxicity (grade 3 and higher leukopenia, neutropenia, and/or thrombocytopenia), resulting in treatment cessation for 23% of patients . This toxicity can partly be predicted with germline polymorphisms in the MGMT gene. Successful prediction of toxicity may lead to more cost-effective individualized monitoring of at-risk subjects.. Tyrosine-kinase inhibitor oral therapy for solid tumors have revolutionized treatment but ensuring quality of life during treatment requires vigilant monitoring and management of adverse events, which range from mild (e.g., rash, diarrhea, fatigue) to severe (e.g., hepatotoxicity, cardiotoxicity). Recommendations are that during the clinical studies for new drugs, genome-wide association studies (GWAS) should be performed to identify markers or risk scores that could predict a higher toxicity for specific patients, commonly referred to as toxgnostics.. Toxgnostic biomarker tests currently available for use in clinical practice include markers for irinotecan, thioguanine, warfarin and 5FU.

== Toxgnostic principles ==
Toxgnostic studies are defined by four key elements:

1. Analysis should be embedded within large, prospective, randomized, controlled clinical trials (i.e. Phase III clinical trials)
2. The phenotype of interest should be clinically relevant and clearly defined using internationally standardized criteria and systematically captured such as the US National Cancer Institute (NCI) Common Terminology Criteria for Adverse Events (CTCAE) grade 3–5 toxicity.
3. Analysis should be unbiased to encompass the maximum relevant genomic diversity, rather than being limited by what is often a superficial understanding of the pathways involved in the pharmacokinetics and pharmacodynamics of the agent.
4. The performance of individual variants should be compared with that of a combined risk score, which may outperform each individual variant when they are analysed separately.

Appropriate analytical approaches for toxgnostic studies include candidate gene studies, GWAS and whole genome sequencing. GWAS and whole genome sequencing are the most comprehensive approaches though careful considerations must be applied to the relevance, analysis and interpretation of the results to prevent over-fitting, which produces false-positive results, a proposed GWAS workflow is shown below.

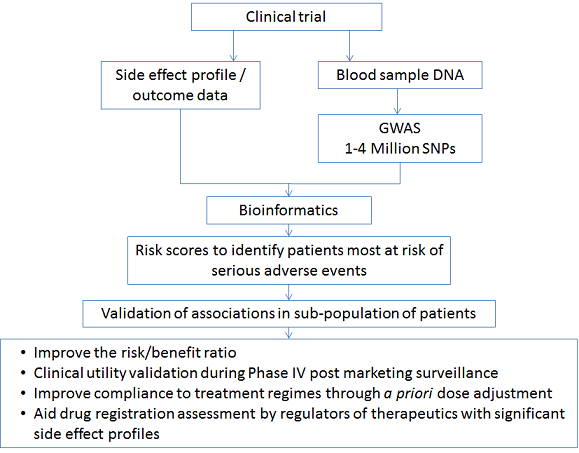
Proposed clinical trial paradigm for discovery of toxgnostics markers through GWAS.

== Regulatory oversight of toxgnostic tests ==
Toxicity biomarkers can be co-developed and co-approved with the respective drug as a companion diagnostic test, this requires premarket approval (PMA). The Food and Drug Administration (FDA) IVD Companion Diagnostic Device guidance issued in draft 14 July 2011 states that a companion diagnostic test can be used to “Identify patients likely to be at increased risk for serious adverse reactions as a result of treatment with a particular therapeutic product”. Additionally there are guidelines for the submission of pharmacogenomic studies from the FDA and draft guidance from the European Medicines Agency (EMA).
