= Cidoxepin =

Pharmaceutical drug

Clinical data
- Other names: (Z)-Doxepin; cis-Doxepin; P-4599

Identifiers
- IUPAC name: (3Z)-3-(6H-Benzo[c][1]benzoxepin-11-ylidene)-N,N-dimethylpropan-1-amine
- CAS Number: 3607-18-9
- PubChem CID: 667468
- ChemSpider: 580850
- UNII: F96TTB8728
- ChEBI: CHEBI:36691
- CompTox Dashboard (EPA): DTXSID301318253

Chemical and physical data
- Formula: C_{19}H_{21}NO
- Molar mass: 279.383 g·mol^{−1}
- 3D model (JSmol): Interactive image
- SMILES: CN(C)CC/C=C\1/C2=CC=CC=C2COC3=CC=CC=C31
- InChI: InChI=1S/C19H21NO/c1-20(2)13-7-11-17-16-9-4-3-8-15(16)14-21-19-12-6-5-10-18(17)19/h3-6,8-12H,7,13-14H2,1-2H3/b17-11-; Key:ODQWQRRAPPTVAG-BOPFTXTBSA-N

Cidoxepin (former developmental code name P-4599), also known as cis-doxepin or (Z)-doxepin, is a tricyclic antidepressant which was developed in the 1960s but was never marketed. It is the cis or (Z) stereoisomer of doxepin, a mixture of (E) and (Z) isomers that is used commercially in a ratio of approximately 17:3 with cidoxepin as a relatively minor constituent. However, the drug has similar activity to that of doxepin, acting as a serotonin–norepinephrine reuptake inhibitor, H_{1} receptor antagonist, and anticholinergic, and notably is thought to have more antidepressant activity than trans-doxepin. The central anticholinergic activity of cidoxepin has been reported to be 3-fold greater than that of the trans isomer in mice.

Cidoxepin has recently been reinvestigated and is now currently under development as an antihistamine by Elorac, Inc. for the treatment of chronic urticaria (hives). As of 2017, it is in phase II clinical trials for this indication. The drug was also under investigation for the treatment of allergic rhinitis (hay fever), atopic dermatitis (atopic eczema), and contact dermatitis, but development for these indications was discontinued.

== See also ==
- Esmirtazapine
- Nordoxepin
