= Clinomics =

Field of research

Clinomics is the study of -omics data along with its associated clinical data. The term -omics generally refers to a study of biology. As an example, genomics is the study of the entire genome of an organism and was the first -omics term.

As personalized medicine advances, clinomics will be a bridge between basic biological data and its effect on human health. As an example, there have been studies of the genes expressed in certain cancer tissues as a way of classification of the cancer and the putative best form of treatment.

Already we know that certain genes such as BRCA1 are associated with a higher probability of developing breast cancer. Clinomics takes the next step by looking at not only the genetics of the patient, but also such data as mRNA, metabolites, and proteins associated with a patient and a disease.
