= Gili Iyang Island =

Island in Indonesia

Gili Iyang
- Location in Java

Geography
- Coordinates: 6.984°S 114.175°E
- Adjacent to: Bali Sea

Gili Iyang is an island in the Bali Sea. The island is administered by Sumenep Regency of Indonesia's East Java province.

== Description ==
Gili Lyang is located in the Bali sea. The island is relatively underdeveloped and has been noted for its plant diversity and high concentrations of oxygen. Several villages are located on the island, and a 2019 scholarly article notes that the local population relies heavily on local plants for food and medicine. The island traditionally suffered from water shortages but infrastructure has gradually been improved and wells dug.

The island's unusually high concentrations of oxygen have led to Gili Lyang being considered as a potential tourism hub.
