= CYP2C9 =

Enzyme protein

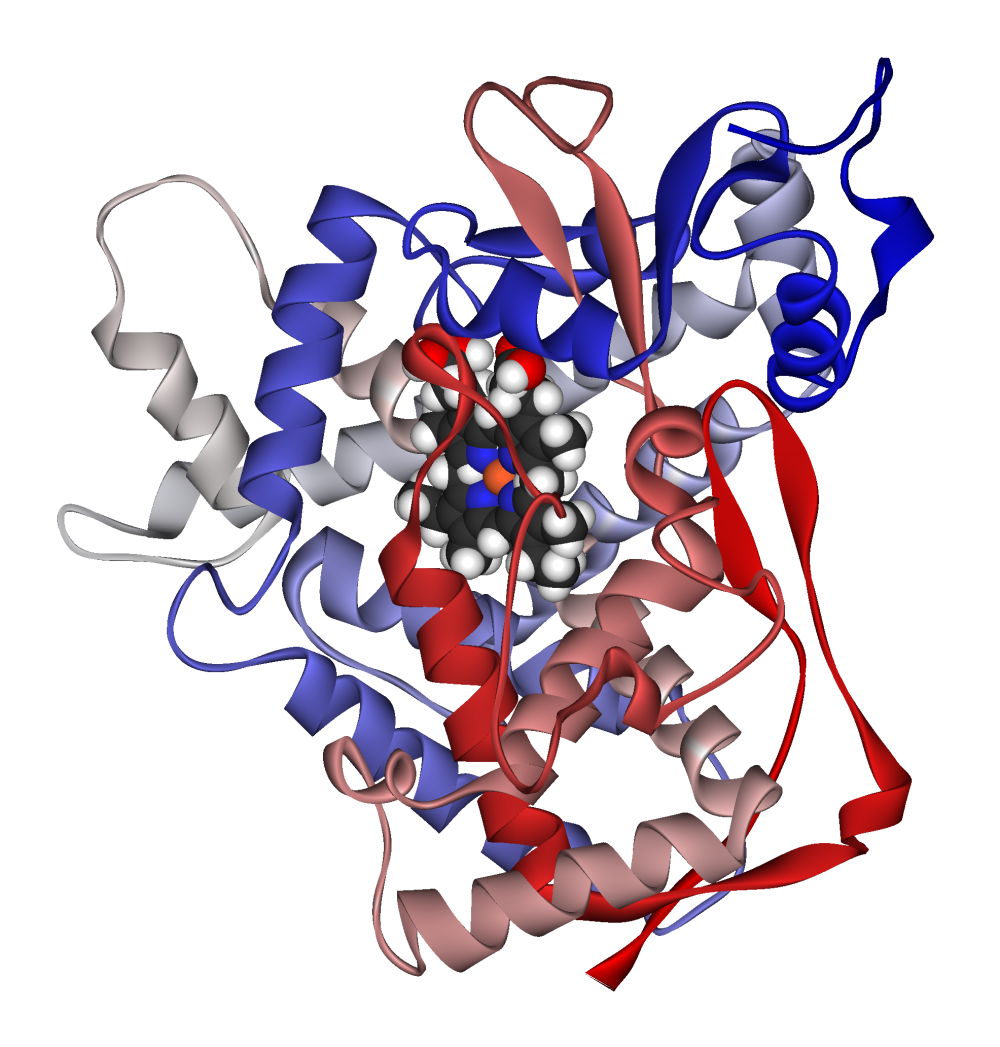

Identifiers
- Aliases: CYP2C9, CPC9, CYP2C, CYP2C10, CYPIIC9, P450IIC9, cytochrome P450 family 2 subfamily C member 9, Cytochrome P450 2C9, P450-2C9
- External IDs: OMIM: 601130; MGI: 1919553; GeneCards: CYP2C9
Available structures
PDB	Human UniProt search: PDBe RCSB
PDB	List of PDB id codes 1OG2, 1OG5, 1R9O, 4NZ2
Enzyme activity
EC #	BRENDA	ExPASy	KEGG	MetaCyc
1.14.14.1	↗	↗	↗	↗
1.14.14.51	↗	↗	↗	↗
1.14.14.52	↗	↗	↗	↗
1.14.14.53	↗	↗	↗	↗

Gene location (Human)
Chr.	Chromosome 10 (human)
Band	10q23.33	Start	94,938,658 bp
Band	10q23.33	End	94,990,091 bp

Gene location (Mouse)
Chr.	Chromosome 19 (mouse)
Band	19|19 C3	Start	39,049,459 bp
Band	19|19 C3	End	39,082,388 bp
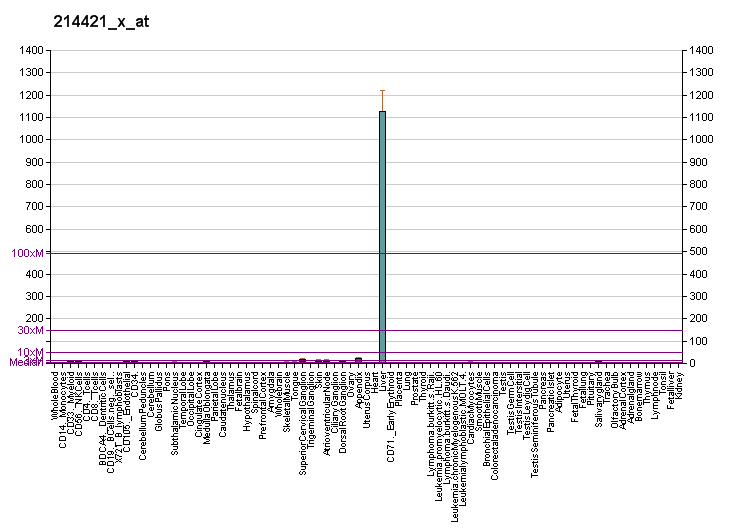

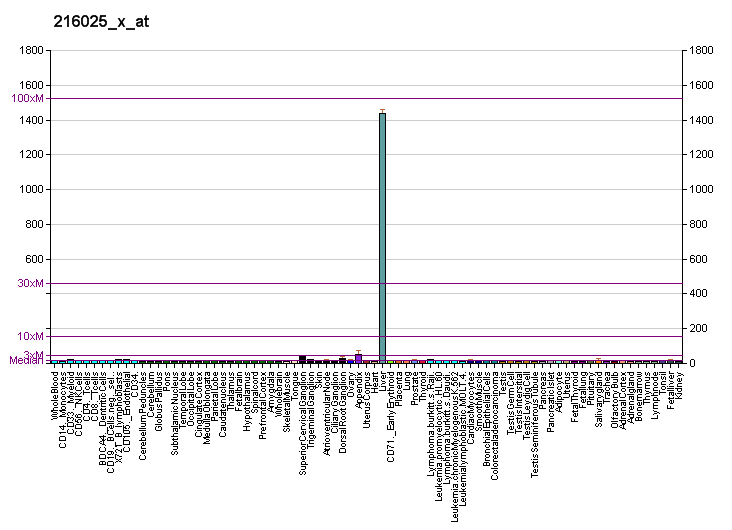

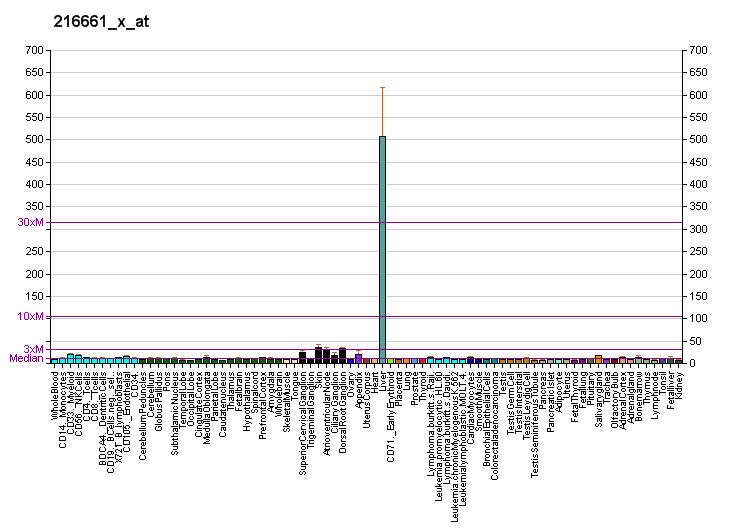
RNA expression pattern
Bgee	Human / Mouse (ortholog); Top expressed in: right lobe of liver; jejunal mucosa; pancreatic ductal cell; mucosa of ileum; duodenum; gallbladder; gingival epithelium; epithelium of esophagus; body of stomach; gastric mucosa / Top expressed in: duodenum; jejunum; ileum; colon; stomach; esophagus; embryo; pancreas; islet of Langerhans; quadriceps femoris muscle; More reference expression data
BioGPS	More reference expression data
Gene ontology
Molecular function	iron ion binding; arachidonic acid epoxygenase activity; metal ion binding; steroid hydroxylase activity; caffeine oxidase activity; heme binding; oxidoreductase activity, acting on paired donors, with incorporation or reduction of molecular oxygen; oxidoreductase activity; monooxygenase activity; oxidoreductase activity, acting on paired donors, with incorporation or reduction of molecular oxygen, reduced flavin or flavoprotein as one donor, and incorporation of one atom of oxygen
Cellular component	organelle membrane; endoplasmic reticulum membrane; membrane; intracellular membrane-bounded organelle; endoplasmic reticulum; cytoplasm
Biological process	steroid metabolic process; lipid metabolism; cellular amide metabolic process; epoxygenase P450 pathway; monocarboxylic acid metabolic process; oxidative demethylation; omega-hydroxylase P450 pathway; monoterpenoid metabolic process; xenobiotic metabolic process; urea metabolic process; long-chain fatty acid biosynthetic process; organic acid metabolic process; estrogen metabolic process
Sources:Amigo / QuickGO
Orthologs
Databases	NCBI: entry; OMA: entry
Species	Human	Mouse
Entrez	1559	72303
Ensembl	ENSG00000138109	ENSMUSG00000067231
UniProt	P11712	n/a
RefSeq (mRNA)	NM_000771	NM_028191
RefSeq (protein)	NP_000762	n/a
Location (UCSC)	Chr 10: 94.94 – 94.99 Mb	Chr 19: 39.05 – 39.08 Mb
PubMed search
- Wikidata
View/Edit Human	View/Edit Mouse

Cytochrome P450 family 2 subfamily C member 9 (abbreviated CYP2C9) is an enzyme protein. The enzyme is involved in the metabolism, by oxidation, of both xenobiotics, including drugs, and endogenous compounds, including fatty acids. In humans, the protein is encoded by the CYP2C9 gene. The gene is highly polymorphic, which affects the efficiency of the metabolism by the enzyme.

== Function ==
CYP2C9 is a cytochrome P450 enzyme that metabolizes, by oxidation, both xenobiotic and endogenous compounds. CYP2C9 makes up about 18% of the cytochrome P450 protein in liver microsomes. The protein is mainly expressed in the liver, duodenum, and small intestine. About 100 therapeutic drugs are metabolized by CYP2C9, including drugs with a narrow therapeutic index such as warfarin and phenytoin, and other routinely prescribed drugs such as acenocoumarol, tolbutamide, losartan, glipizide, and some nonsteroidal anti-inflammatory drugs. By contrast, the known extrahepatic CYP2C9 often metabolizes important endogenous compounds such as serotonin and, owing to its epoxygenase activity, various polyunsaturated fatty acids, converting these fatty acids to a wide range of biologically active products.

In particular, CYP2C9 metabolizes arachidonic acid to the following eicosatrienoic acid epoxide (EETs) stereoisomer sets: 5R,6S-epoxy-8Z,11Z,14Z-eicosatetraenoic and 5S,6R-epoxy-8Z,11Z,14Z-eicosatetraenoic acids; 11R,12S-epoxy-8Z,11Z,14Z-eicosatetraenoic and 11S,12R-epoxy-5Z,8Z,14Z-eicosatetraenoic acids; and 14R,15S-epoxy-5Z,8Z,11Z-eicosatetraenoic and 14S,15R-epoxy-5Z,8Z,11Z-eicosatetraenoic acids. It likewise metabolizes docosahexaenoic acid to epoxydocosapentaenoic acids (EDPs; primarily 19,20-epoxy-eicosapentaenoic acid isomers [i.e. 10,11-EDPs]) and eicosapentaenoic acid to epoxyeicosatetraenoic acids (EEQs, primarily 17,18-EEQ and 14,15-EEQ isomers). Animal models and a limited number of human studies implicate these epoxides in reducing hypertension; protecting against myocardial infarction and other insults to the heart; promoting the growth and metastasis of certain cancers; inhibiting inflammation; stimulating blood vessel formation; and possessing a variety of actions on neural tissues including modulating neurohormone release and blocking pain perception (see epoxyeicosatrienoic acid and epoxygenase).

In vitro studies on human and animal cells and tissues and in vivo animal model studies indicate that certain EDPs and EEQs (16,17-EDPs, 19,20-EDPs, 17,18-EEQs have been most often examined) have actions which often oppose those of another product of CYP450 enzymes (e.g. CYP4A1, CYP4A11, CYP4F2, CYP4F3A, and CYP4F3B) viz., 20-Hydroxyeicosatetraenoic acid (20-HETE), principally in the areas of blood pressure regulation, blood vessel thrombosis, and cancer growth (see 20-Hydroxyeicosatetraenoic acid, epoxyeicosatetraenoic acid, and epoxydocosapentaenoic acid sections on activities and clinical significance). Such studies also indicate that the eicosapentaenoic acids and EEQs are: 1) more potent than EETs in decreasing hypertension and pain perception; 2) more potent than or equal in potency to the EETs in suppressing inflammation; and 3) act oppositely from the EETs in that they inhibit angiogenesis, endothelial cell migration, endothelial cell proliferation, and the growth and metastasis of human breast and prostate cancer cell lines whereas EETs have stimulatory effects in each of these systems. Consumption of omega-3 fatty acid-rich diets dramatically raises the serum and tissue levels of EDPs and EEQs in animals as well as humans, and in humans is by far the most prominent change in the profile of polyunsaturated fatty acids metabolites caused by dietary omega-3 fatty acids.

CYP2C9 may also metabolize linoleic acid to the potentially very toxic products, coronaric acid (also termed leukotoxin) and vernolic acid (also termed isoleukotoxin); these linoleic acid epoxides cause multiple organ failure and acute respiratory distress in animal models and may contribute to these syndromes in humans.

== Pharmacogenomics ==
The CYP2C9 gene is highly polymorphic. At least 20 single nucleotide polymorphisms (SNPs) have been reported to have functional evidence of altered enzyme activity. In fact, adverse drug reactions (ADRs) often result from unanticipated changes in CYP2C9 enzyme activity secondary to genetic polymorphisms. Especially for CYP2C9 substrates such as warfarin and phenytoin, diminished metabolic capacity because of genetic polymorphisms or drug-drug interactions can lead to toxicity at normal therapeutic doses. Information about how human genetic variation of CYP2C9 affects response to medications can be found in databases such PharmGKB, Clinical Pharmacogenetics Implementation Consortium (CPIC).

The label CYP2C9*1 is assigned by the Pharmacogene Variation Consortium (PharmVar) to the most commonly observed human gene variant. Other relevant variants are cataloged by PharmVar under consecutive numbers, which are written after an asterisk (star) character to form an allele label. The two most well-characterized variant alleles are CYP2C9*2 (NM_000771.3:c.430C>T, p.Arg144Cys, rs1799853) and CYP2C9*3 (NM_000771.3:c.1075A>C, p. Ile359Leu, rs1057910), causing reductions in enzyme activity of 30% and 80%, respectively.

=== Metabolizer phenotypes ===
On the basis of their ability to metabolize CYP2C9 substrates, individuals can be categorized by groups. The carriers of homozygous CYP2C9*1 variant, i.e. of the *1/*1 genotype, are designated extensive metabolizers (EM), or normal metabolizers. The carriers of the CYP2C9*2 or CYP2C9*3 alleles in a heterozygous state, i.e. just one of these alleles (*1/*2, *1/*3) are designated intermediate metabolizers (IM), and those carrying two of these alleles, i.e. homozygous (*2/*3, *2/*2 or *3/*3) – poor metabolizers (PM). As a result, the metabolic ratio – the ratio of unchanged drug to metabolite – is higher in PMs.

A study of the ability to metabolize warfarin among the carriers of the most well-characterized CYP2C9 genotypes (*1, *2 and *3), expressed as a percentage of the mean dose in patients with wild-type alleles (*1/*1), concluded that the mean warfarin maintenance dose was 92% in *1/*2, 74% in *1/*3, 63% in *2/*3, 61% in *2/*2 and 34% in 3/*3.

CYP2C9*3 reflects an Ile359-Leu (I359L) change in the amino acid sequence, and also has reduced catalytic activity compared with the wild type (CYP2C9*1) for substrates other than warfarin. Its prevalence varies with race as:

Allele frequencies (%) of CYP2C9 polymorphism
	African-American	Black-African	Pygmy	Asian	Caucasian
CYP2C9*3	2.0	0–2.3	0	1.1–3.6	3.3–16.2

=== Test panels of variant alleles ===
The Association for Molecular Pathology Pharmacogenomics (PGx) Working Group in 2019 has recommended a minimum panel of variant alleles (Tier 1) and an extended panel of variant alleles (Tier 2) to be included in assays for CYP2C9 testing.

CYP2C9 variant alleles recommended as Tier 1 by the PGx Working Group include CYP2C9 *2, *3, *5, *6, *8, and *11. This recommendation was based on their well-established functional effects on CYP2C9 activity and drug response availability of reference materials, and their appreciable allele frequencies in major ethnic groups.

The following CYP2C9 alleles are recommended for inclusion in tier 2: CYP2C9*12, *13, and *15.

CYP2C9*13 is defined by a missense variant in exon 2 (NM_000771.3:c.269T>C, p. Leu90Pro, rs72558187). CYP2C9*13 prevalence is approximately 1% in the Asian population, but in Caucasians this variant prevalence is almost zero. This variant is caused by a T269C mutation in the CYP2C9 gene which in turn results in the substitution of leucine at position-90 with proline (L90P) at the product enzyme protein. This residue is near the access point for substrates and the L90P mutation causes lower affinity and hence slower metabolism of several drugs that are metabolized CYP2C9 by such as diclofenac and flurbiprofen. However, this variant is not included in the tier 1 recommendations of the PGx Working Group because of its very low multiethnic minor allele frequency and a lack of currently available reference materials. As of 2020 the evidence level for CYP2C9*13 in the PharmVar database is limited, comparing to the tier 1 alleles, for which the evidence level is definitive.

=== Additional variants ===
Not all clinically significant genetic variant alleles have been registered by PharmVar. For example, in a 2017 study, the variant rs2860905 showed stronger association with warfarin sensitivity (<4 mg/day) than common variants CYP2C9*2 and CYP2C9*3. Allele A (23% global frequency) is associated with a decreased dose of warfarin as compared to the allele G (77% global frequency). Another variant, rs4917639, according to a 2009 study, has a strong effect on warfarin sensitivity, almost the same as if CYP2C9*2 and CYP2C9*3 were combined into a single allele. The C allele at rs4917639 has 19% global frequency. Patients with the CC or CA genotype may require decreased dose of warfarin as compared to patients with the wild-type AA genotype. Another variant, rs7089580 with T allele having 14% global frequency, is associated with increased CYP2C9 gene expression. Carriers of AT and TT genotypes at rs7089580 had increased CYP2C9 expression levels compared to wild-type AA genotype. Increased gene expression due to rs7089580 T allele leads to an increased rate of warfarin metabolism and increased warfarin dose requirements. In a study published in 2014, the AT genotype showed slightly higher expression than TT, but both much higher than AA. Another variant, rs1934969 (in studies of 2012 and 2014) have been shown to affect the ability to metabolize losartan: carriers of the TT genotype have increased CYP2C9 hydroxylation capacity for losartan comparing to AA genotype, and, as a result, the lower metabolic ratio of losartan, i.e., faster losartan metabolism.

== Ligands ==
Most inhibitors of CYP2C9 are competitive inhibitors. Noncompetitive inhibitors of CYP2C9 include nifedipine, phenethyl isothiocyanate, medroxyprogesterone acetate and 6-hydroxyflavone. The noncompetitive binding site of 6-hydroxyflavone is the reported allosteric binding site of the CYP2C9 enzyme.

Following is a table of selected substrates, inducers and inhibitors of CYP2C9. Where classes of agents are listed, there may be exceptions within the class.

Inhibitors of CYP2C9 can be classified by their potency, such as:

- Strong being one that causes at least a 5-fold increase in the plasma AUC values, or more than 80% decrease in clearance.
- Moderate being one that causes at least a 2-fold increase in the plasma AUC values, or a 50–80% decrease in clearance.
- Weak being one that causes at least a 1.25-fold but less than 2-fold increase in the plasma AUC values, or 20–50% decrease in clearance.

Selected inducers, inhibitors and substrates of CYP2C9
Substrates	Inhibitors	Inducers
dietary flavonoids; naringenin; naringin; quercetin; rutin; NSAIDs (analgesic, antipyretic, anti-inflammatory); celecoxib; lornoxicam; diclofenac; ibuprofen; naproxen; ketoprofen; piroxicam; meloxicam; suprofen; phenytoin (antiepileptic); 2-oxo-clopidogrel (an inactive metabolite of clopidogrel prodrug); fluvastatin (statin); sulfonylureas (antidiabetic); glipizide; glibenclamide; glimepiride; tolbutamide; glyburide; angiotensin II receptor antagonists (in hypertension, diabetic nephropathy, CHF); candesartan (Moderate sensitive substrate); irbesartan; losartan (sensitive substrate); S-warfarin (anticoagulant); sildenafil (in erectile dysfunction); terbinafine (antifungal); amitriptyline (tricyclic antidepressant); fluoxetine (SSRI antidepressant); nateglinide (antidiabetic); rosiglitazone (antidiabetic); tamoxifen (SERM); torasemide (loop diuretic); THC; JWH-018; AM-2201; limonene (monoterpene); tapentadol (analgesic); polyunsaturated fatty acids; montelukast (leukotriene receptor antagonist); diltiazem (minor/moderate sensitive substrates); verapamil (minor/moderate sensitive substrates); azilsartan (Minor substrate of CYP2C9)	Strong: miconazole (antifungal); amentoflavone (constituent of Ginkgo biloba and St. John's Wort); sulfaphenazole (antibacterial); Valproic acid (anticonvulsant, mood-stabilizing); Apigenin; Moderate: amiodarone (antiarrhythmic); fluconazole (antifungal); metronidazole (antibiotic and antiprotozoal medication); phenylbutazone; Weak: ceritinib; quercetin (a plant-based flavonol); Unspecified potency: antihistamines (H1-receptor antagonists); cyclizine; promethazine; bergaptol; chloramphenicol; fenofibrate (fibrate); flavones; flavonols; fluvastatin (statin); fluvoxamine (SSRI); isoniazid (in tuberculosis); lovastatin (statin); modafinil; nimesulide (NSAID); phenylbutazone (NSAID); probenecid (uricosuric); sertraline (SSRI); sulfamethoxazole (antibiotic); teniposide (chemotherapeutic); voriconazole (antifungal); zafirlukast (leukotriene antagonist); Tetrahydrocannabinol, cannabidiol, and cannabinol (cannabis constituents); sesamin (a lignan from fagara and sesame); resveratrol (a plant-based stilbenoid)	Strong: rifampicin (bactericidal); secobarbital (barbiturate); Weak: aprepitant; bosentan; phenobarbital; St Johns Wort

== Epoxygenase activity ==
CYP2C9 attacks various long-chain polyunsaturated fatty acids at their double (i.e. alkene) bonds to form epoxide products that act as signaling molecules. It along with CYP2C8, CYP2C19, CYP2J2, and possibly CYP2S1 are the principle enzymes which metabolizes 1) arachidonic acid to various epoxyeicosatrienoic acids (also termed EETs); 2) linoleic acid to 9,10-epoxy-octadecenoic acids (also termed coronaric acid, linoleic acid 9,10-oxide, or leukotoxin) and 12,13-epoxy-octadecenoic acids (also termed vernolic acid, linoleic acid 12,13-oxide, or isoleukotoxin); 3) docosahexaenoic acid to various epoxydocosapentaenoic acids (also termed EDPs); and 4) eicosapentaenoic acid to various epoxyeicosatetraenoic acids (also termed EEQs). Animal model studies implicate these epoxides in regulating: hypertension, myocardial infarction and other insults to the heart, the growth of various cancers, inflammation, blood vessel formation, and pain perception; limited studies suggest but have not proven that these epoxides may function similarly in humans (see Epoxyeicosatrienoic acid and Epoxygenase). Since the consumption of omega-3 fatty acid-rich diets dramatically raises the serum and tissue levels of the EDP and EEQ metabolites of the omega-3 fatty acid, i.e. docosahexaenoic and eicosapentaenoic acids, in animals and humans and in humans is the most prominent change in the profile of polyunsaturated fatty acids metabolites caused by dietary omega-3 fatty acids, eicosapentaenoic acids and EEQs may be responsible for at least some of the beneficial effects ascribed to dietary omega-3 fatty acids.
