= OMT-28 =

Chemical compound

Legal status
- Legal status: Investigational

Identifiers
- IUPAC name: 2-[(Z)-13-[[2-(Methylamino)-2-oxoacetyl]amino]tridec-8-enoxy]acetic acid
- CAS Number: 2068826-41-3
- PubChem CID: 126483508
- UNII: HFO4KT9Y2A

Chemical and physical data
- Formula: C_{18}H_{32}N_{2}O_{5}
- Molar mass: 356.463 g·mol^{−1}

OMT-28 is a synthetic analog of omega-3 epoxyeicosatrienoic acids developed for atrial fibrillation.
