= Beckhoplia elkeae =

Scientific classification
- Kingdom: Animalia
- Phylum: Arthropoda
- Class: Insecta
- Order: Coleoptera
- Suborder: Polyphaga
- Infraorder: Scarabaeiformia
- Family: Scarabaeidae
- Genus: Beckhoplia
- Species: B. elkeae

Binomial name
- Beckhoplia elkeae Dombrow, 2020

Species of beetle

Beckhoplia elkeae is a species of beetle of the family Scarabaeidae. It is found in South Africa (Northern Cape). The habitat consists of Namaqualand Klipkoppe Shrubland.

== Description ==
Adults reach a length of about 7.9–8.4 mm (0.31–0.33 in) (males) and 7.6–8.7 mm (0.30–0.34 in) (females). They are black with pale brown elytra with blackened lateral and posterior margins. The suture is sometimes also blackened. Females are black with pale red-brown elytra, darkening (or sometimes blackened) towards the lateral margin and with the suture sometimes red-brown.

== Life history ==
The recorded host plants are Tripteris clandestina, Tripteris oppositifolia, Didelta spinosa and Stoeberia frutescens.

== Etymology ==
The species is dedicated to Elke Dombrow, wife of the first author.
