= Beckhoplia pallidibrunnea =

Scientific classification
- Kingdom: Animalia
- Phylum: Arthropoda
- Class: Insecta
- Order: Coleoptera
- Suborder: Polyphaga
- Infraorder: Scarabaeiformia
- Family: Scarabaeidae
- Genus: Beckhoplia
- Species: B. pallidibrunnea

Binomial name
- Beckhoplia pallidibrunnea Dombrow, 2020

Species of beetle

Beckhoplia pallidibrunnea is a species of beetle of the family Scarabaeidae. It is found in South Africa (Northern Cape). The habitat consists of Nieuwoudtville Shale Renosterveld.

== Description ==
Adults reach a length of about 8.5–9.7 mm (0.33–0.38 in). They are black with pale-brown elytra, sometimes with blackened margins.

== Life history ==
The recorded host plants are Moraea miniata and Arctotis acaulis.

== Etymology ==
The species name is derived from Latin pallidi- (meaning pale) and brunne- (meaning brown) and refers to the colour of the elytra.
