= Ursinia pulchra =

Scientific classification
- Kingdom: Plantae
- Clade: Tracheophytes
- Clade: Angiosperms
- Clade: Eudicots
- Clade: Asterids
- Order: Asterales
- Family: Asteraceae
- Genus: Ursinia
- Species: U. pulchra

Binomial name
- Ursinia pulchra N.E.Br.

Species of flowering plant

Ursinia pulchra (syn. Sphenogyne speciosa Knowles & Westc.) is a flowering plant in the family Asteraceae, which is used as an ornamental plant.
