= Beckhoplia caliginosa =

Scientific classification
- Kingdom: Animalia
- Phylum: Arthropoda
- Class: Insecta
- Order: Coleoptera
- Suborder: Polyphaga
- Infraorder: Scarabaeiformia
- Family: Scarabaeidae
- Genus: Beckhoplia
- Species: B. caliginosa

Binomial name
- Beckhoplia caliginosa Dombrow, 2020

Species of beetle

Beckhoplia caliginosa is a species of beetle of the family Scarabaeidae. It is found in South Africa (Western Cape). The habitat consists of Agter-Sederberg Shrubland.

== Description ==
Adults reach a length of about 6.9–7.8 mm (0.27–0.31 in) (males) and 6.8–8.1 mm (0.27–0.32 in) (females). Males are black with the scutellar torus on the elytra sometimes brown. Females are also black, but have pale to dark brown elytra, with blackened margins and costae.

== Life history ==
The recorded host plant is Didelta spinosa.

== Etymology ==
The species name is derived from Latin caligin- (meaning dark) and refers to the colour of the species.
