= Beckhoplia gifbergensis =

Scientific classification
- Kingdom: Animalia
- Phylum: Arthropoda
- Class: Insecta
- Order: Coleoptera
- Suborder: Polyphaga
- Infraorder: Scarabaeiformia
- Family: Scarabaeidae
- Genus: Beckhoplia
- Species: B. gifbergensis

Binomial name
- Beckhoplia gifbergensis Dombrow, 2020

Species of beetle

Beckhoplia gifbergensis is a species of beetle of the family Scarabaeidae. It is found in South Africa (Western Cape). The habitat consists of Vanrhynsdorp Gannabosveld.

== Description ==
Adults reach a length of about 6.6–7.1 mm (0.26–0.28 in) (males) and 7.2–7.4 mm (0.28–0.29 in) (females). Males are black with pale-brown elytra with broadly blackened lateral and posterior margins. Females are black with pale-brown elytra with a broadly blackened lateral margin.

== Life history ==
The recorded host plant is Didelta spinosa.
