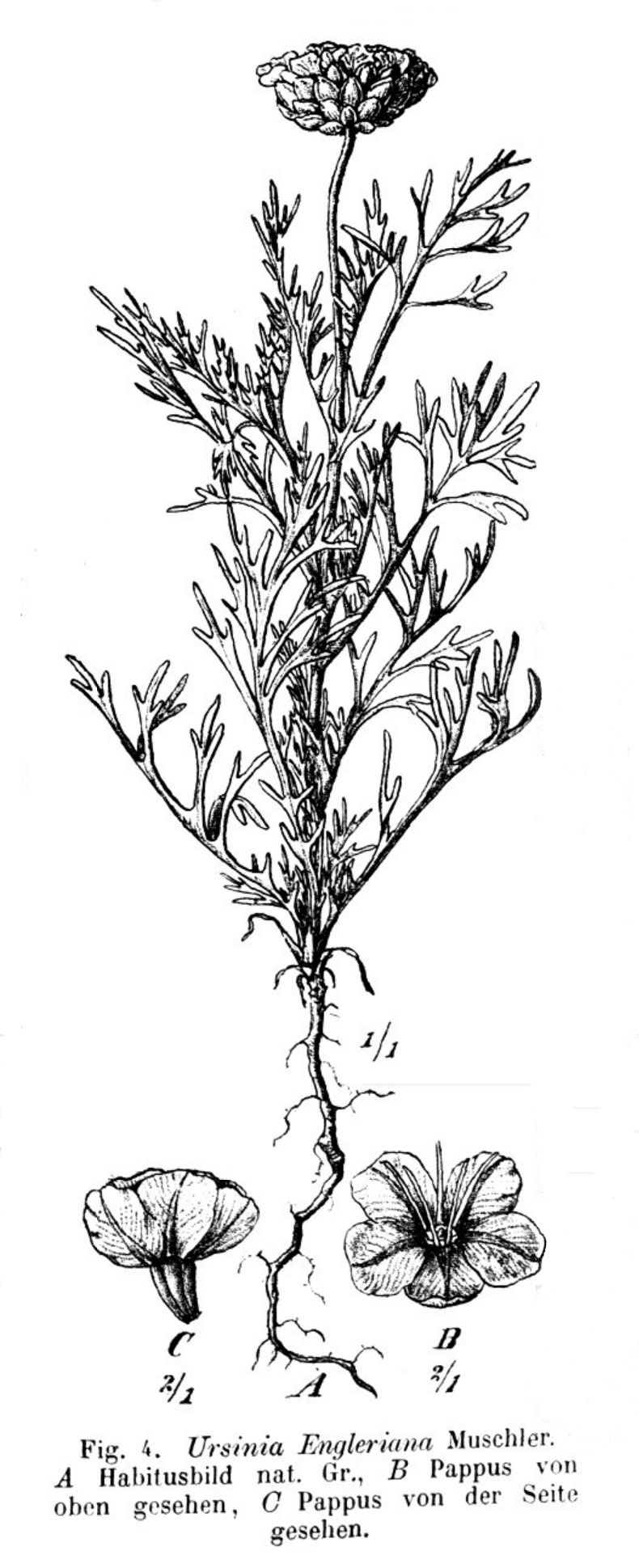

Scientific classification
- Kingdom: Plantae
- Clade: Tracheophytes
- Clade: Angiosperms
- Clade: Eudicots
- Clade: Asterids
- Order: Asterales
- Family: Asteraceae
- Genus: Ursinia
- Species: U. nana

Binomial name
- Ursinia nana DC.

= Ursinia nana =

Species of flowering plant

Ursinia nana DC. is an annual herb belonging to the daisy family of Asteraceae. It native to Africa, where it has a disjunct distribution in northeastern Africa (Eritrea and Ethiopia) and southern Africa (South Africa, Lesotho, Namibia, and Zimbabwe). It is a pioneer plant of disturbed ground and usually grows to a height of only 30 cm. It flowers throughout the rainy season and, in mild weather with late rains, well into the autumn months. The leaves are deeply laciniate and bunched. In his 1912 contribution to Botanische Jahrbücher für Systematik, Pflanzengeschichte und Pflanzengeographie, the enigmatic German botanist Reinhold Conrad Muschler describes Ursinia engleriana, found near Okahandja in South West Africa, as a new species of African composite. Later this was considered to be the same as Ursinia nana described by de Candolle. Muschler praised the species as being extremely ornamental.

The genus was named in honor of German scholar Johannes Heinrich Ursinus (1608-1667).

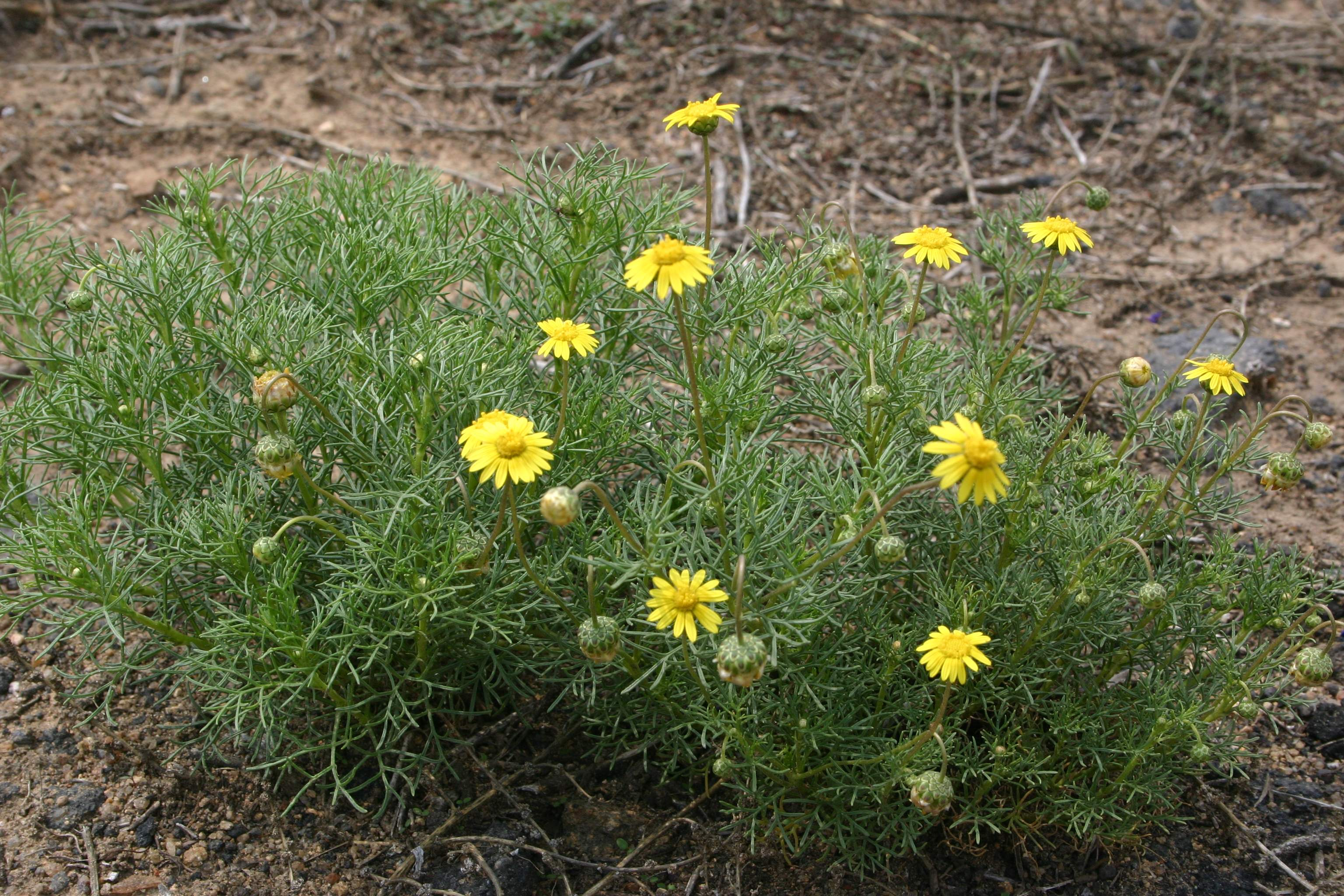
Ursinia nana habit

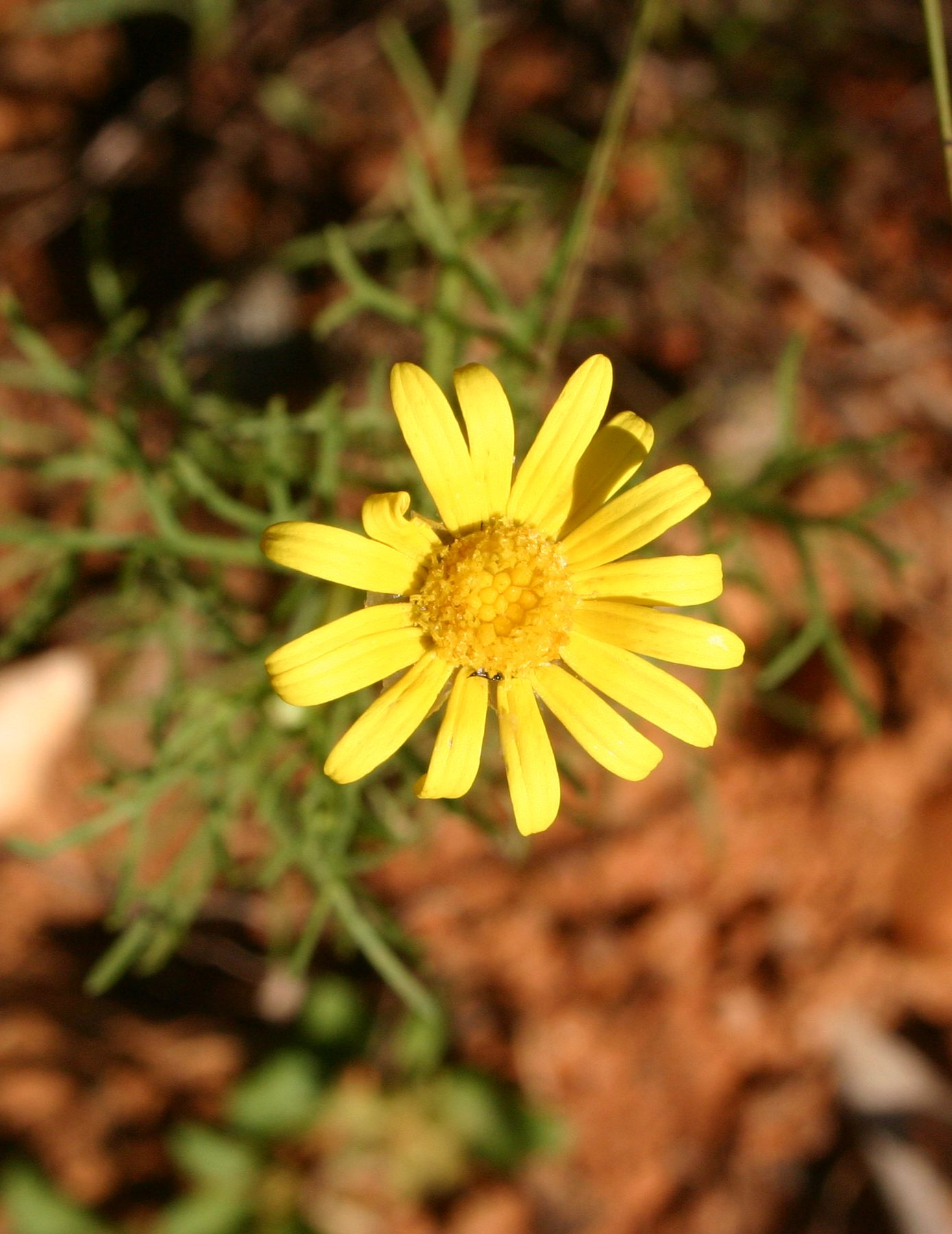

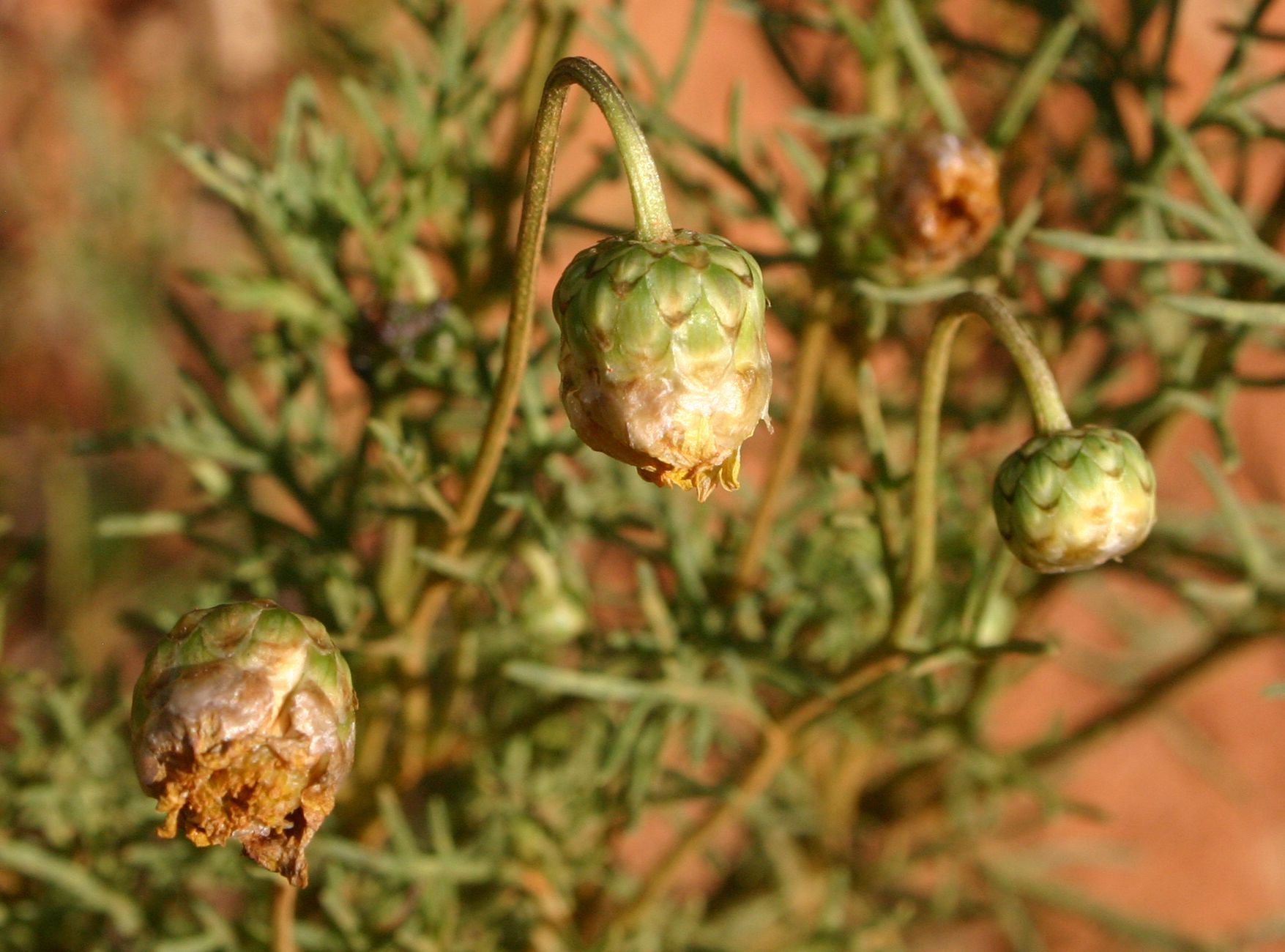

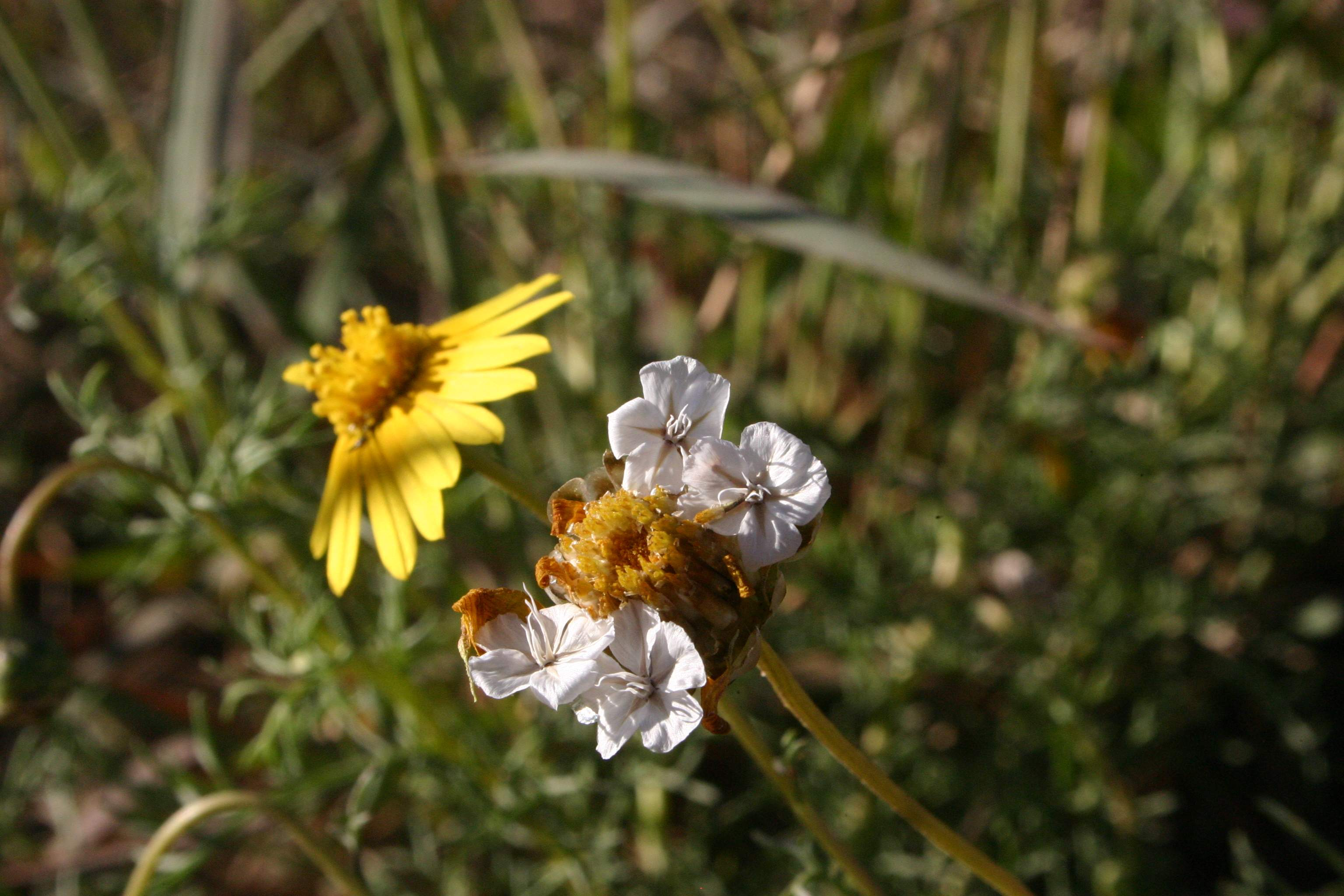
Ursinia nana petal-like pappus
