= Beckhoplia dolichiocnemis =

Scientific classification
- Kingdom: Animalia
- Phylum: Arthropoda
- Class: Insecta
- Order: Coleoptera
- Suborder: Polyphaga
- Infraorder: Scarabaeiformia
- Family: Scarabaeidae
- Genus: Beckhoplia
- Species: B. dolichiocnemis

Binomial name
- Beckhoplia dolichiocnemis Dombrow, 2020

Species of beetle

Beckhoplia dolichiocnemis is a species of beetle of the family Scarabaeidae. It is found in South Africa (Western Cape). The habitat consists of Cederberg Sandstone Fynbos.

== Description ==
Adults reach a length of about 4.6–5.7 mm (0.18–0.22 in). They are black with pale brown elytra with blackened lateral and posterior margins.

== Life history ==
The recorded host plants are Dimorphotheca sinuata, Ursinia anthemoides and Arctotheca calendula.

== Etymology ==
The species name is derived from Greek dolikhós (meaning long) and knḗmç (meaning shin bone) and refers to the long, elongate hind legs.
