= Beckhoplia setosa =

Scientific classification
- Kingdom: Animalia
- Phylum: Arthropoda
- Class: Insecta
- Order: Coleoptera
- Suborder: Polyphaga
- Infraorder: Scarabaeiformia
- Family: Scarabaeidae
- Genus: Beckhoplia
- Species: B. setosa

Binomial name
- Beckhoplia setosa Dombrow, 2020

Species of beetle

Beckhoplia setosa is a species of beetle of the family Scarabaeidae. It is found in South Africa (Northern Cape). The habitat consists of Bokkeveld Sandstone Fynbos.

== Description ==
Adults reach a length of about 7.9 mm (0.31 in). They are black with pale-brown elytra, sometimes with blackened margins.

== Life history ==
The recorded host plant is Moraea miniata.

== Etymology ==
The species name is derived from Latin set- (meaning bristle) and refers to the long brown setae on the pronotum.
