= Beckhoplia bicolor =

Scientific classification
- Kingdom: Animalia
- Phylum: Arthropoda
- Class: Insecta
- Order: Coleoptera
- Suborder: Polyphaga
- Infraorder: Scarabaeiformia
- Family: Scarabaeidae
- Genus: Beckhoplia
- Species: B. bicolor

Binomial name
- Beckhoplia bicolor Dombrow, 2020

Species of beetle

Beckhoplia bicolor is a species of beetle of the family Scarabaeidae. It is found in South Africa (Northern Cape). The habitat consists of Bokkeveld Sandstone Fynbos.

== Description ==
Adults reach a length of about 8.3 mm (0.33 in). They are black with yellowish pale brown elytra with broadly blackened lateral and posterior margins.

== Life history ==
The recorded host plant is Didelta spinosa.

== Etymology ==
The species name is derived from Latin bi (meaning two) and color (meaning colour) and refers to the bicoloured elytra.
