= Beckhoplia nigrofasciata =

Scientific classification
- Kingdom: Animalia
- Phylum: Arthropoda
- Class: Insecta
- Order: Coleoptera
- Suborder: Polyphaga
- Infraorder: Scarabaeiformia
- Family: Scarabaeidae
- Genus: Beckhoplia
- Species: B. nigrofasciata

Binomial name
- Beckhoplia nigrofasciata Dombrow, 2020

Species of beetle

Beckhoplia nigrofasciata is a species of beetle of the family Scarabaeidae. It is found in South Africa (Northern Cape). The habitat consists of Bokkeveld Sandstone Fynbos.

== Description ==
Adults reach a length of about 7.8–8.1 mm (0.31–0.32 in) (males) and 7.9–8.7 mm (0.31–0.34 in) (females). They are black with pale-brown elytra with blackened outer margins.

== Life history ==
The recorded host plant is Didelta spinosa.

== Etymology ==
The species name is derived from Latin nigr- (meaning black) and fasciat- (meaning banded) and refers to the black band on the outer margins.
