= Beckhoplia suturalis =

Scientific classification
- Kingdom: Animalia
- Phylum: Arthropoda
- Class: Insecta
- Order: Coleoptera
- Suborder: Polyphaga
- Infraorder: Scarabaeiformia
- Family: Scarabaeidae
- Genus: Beckhoplia
- Species: B. suturalis

Binomial name
- Beckhoplia suturalis Dombrow, 2020

Species of beetle

Beckhoplia suturalis is a species of beetle of the family Scarabaeidae. It is found in South Africa (Northern Cape). The habitat consists of Nieuwoudtville Shale Renosterveld.

== Description ==
Adults reach a length of about 7.8–9.6 mm (0.31–0.38 in) (males) and 8.6–9.5 mm (0.34–0.37 in) (females). They are black with brown elytra with blackened lateral and posterior margins. Females only have the lateral margins of the elytra darkened.

== Life history ==
The recorded host plant is Moraea miniata.

== Etymology ==
The species name is derived from Latin sutur (meaning seam) and refers to the elevated suture.
