= Beckhoplia occidentalis =

Scientific classification
- Kingdom: Animalia
- Phylum: Arthropoda
- Class: Insecta
- Order: Coleoptera
- Suborder: Polyphaga
- Infraorder: Scarabaeiformia
- Family: Scarabaeidae
- Genus: Beckhoplia
- Species: B. occidentalis

Binomial name
- Beckhoplia occidentalis Dombrow, 2005

Species of beetle

Beckhoplia occidentalis is a species of beetle of the family Scarabaeidae. It is found in South Africa (Northern Cape). The habitat consists of Nieuwoudtville Shale Renosterveld.

== Description ==
Adults reach a length of about 7.6–8.8 mm (0.30–0.35 in) (males) and 7.4–9.2 mm (0.29–0.36 in) (females). They are black with brown elytra with blackened margins. In females, only the lateral margin of the elytra is blackened.

== Life history ==
The recorded host plant is Arctotis acaulis.
