= Beckhoplia pumila =

Scientific classification
- Kingdom: Animalia
- Phylum: Arthropoda
- Class: Insecta
- Order: Coleoptera
- Suborder: Polyphaga
- Infraorder: Scarabaeiformia
- Family: Scarabaeidae
- Genus: Beckhoplia
- Species: B. pumila

Binomial name
- Beckhoplia pumila Dombrow, 2020

Species of beetle

Beckhoplia pumila is a species of beetle of the family Scarabaeidae. It is found in South Africa (Western Cape). The habitat consists of Bokkeveld Sandstone Fynbos.

== Description ==
Adults reach a length of about 6.5–7.1 mm (0.26–0.28 in) (males) and 6.8–8.2 mm (0.27–0.32 in) (females). Males are black with yellowish pale-brown elytra with blackened lateral and posterior margins. Females are black, with blackened lateral and posterior margins of the elytra.

== Life history ==
The recorded host plants are Didelta spinosa, Berkheya fruticosa and Arctotheca calendula.

== Etymology ==
The species name is derived from Latin pumili- (meaning dwarf) and refers to the small size of the species.
