= Beckhoplia fusca =

Scientific classification
- Kingdom: Animalia
- Phylum: Arthropoda
- Class: Insecta
- Order: Coleoptera
- Suborder: Polyphaga
- Infraorder: Scarabaeiformia
- Family: Scarabaeidae
- Genus: Beckhoplia
- Species: B. fusca

Binomial name
- Beckhoplia fusca Dombrow, 2020

Species of beetle

Beckhoplia fusca is a species of beetle of the family Scarabaeidae. It is found in South Africa (Northern Cape). The habitat consists of Bokkeveld Sandstone Fynbos.

== Description ==
Adults reach a length of about 7.9–8.9 mm (0.31–0.35 in). They are black with brown elytra.

== Life history ==
The recorded host plant is Moraea bifida.

== Etymology ==
The species name is derived from Latin fusc- (meaning brown) and refers to the colour of the elytra.
