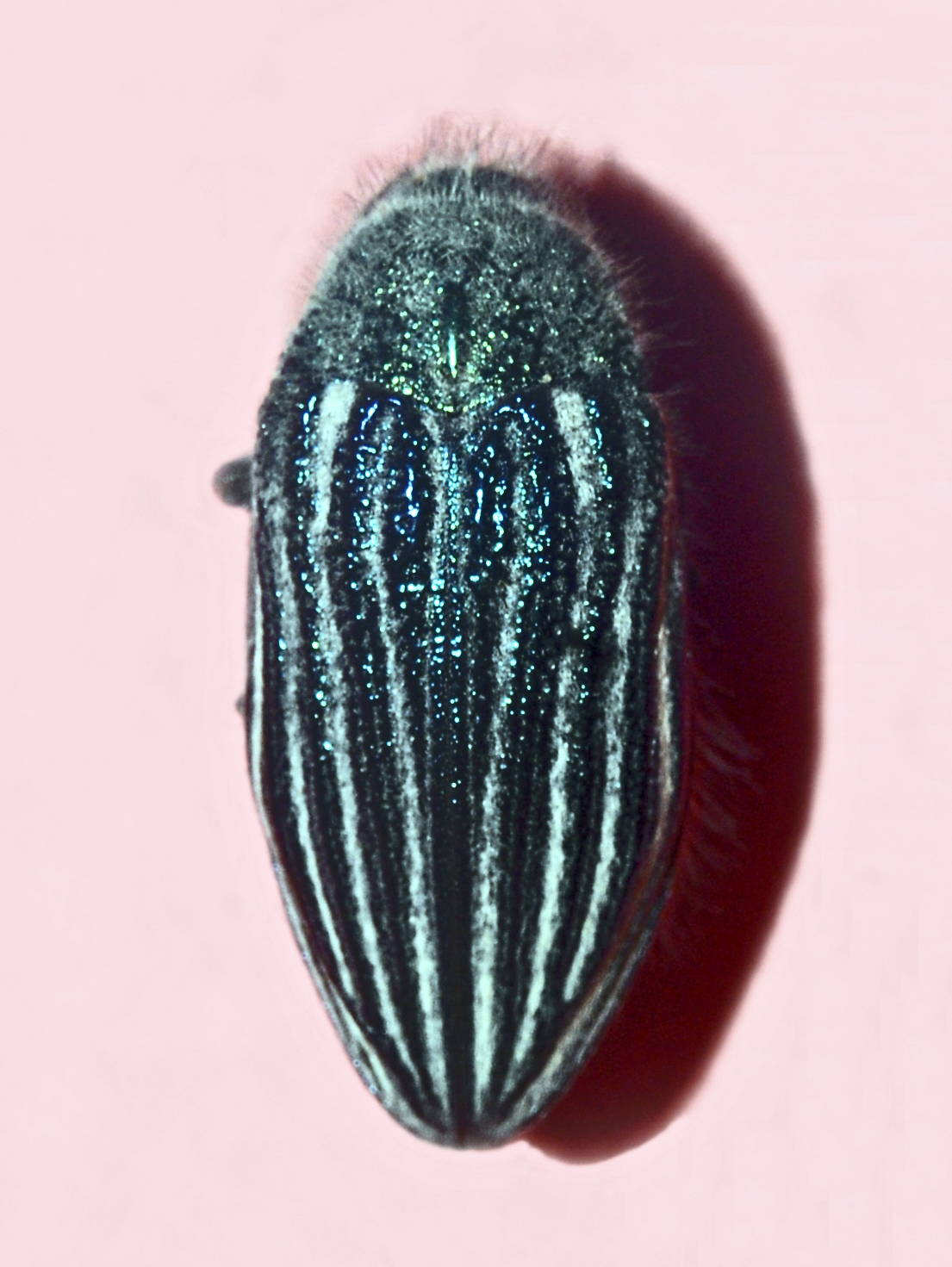
- Museum specimen of Julodis andreae

Scientific classification
- Kingdom: Animalia
- Phylum: Arthropoda
- Clade: Pancrustacea
- Class: Insecta
- Order: Coleoptera
- Suborder: Polyphaga
- Infraorder: Elateriformia
- Family: Buprestidae
- Genus: Julodis
- Species: J. andreae

Binomial name
- Julodis andreae (Olivier, 1790)

Synonyms
- Julodis ampliata Marseul, 1865

= Julodis andreae =

Species of beetle

Julodis andreae is a species of beetles belonging to the Buprestidae family.

== Subspecies ==
- Julodis andreae andreae (Olivier, 1790)
- Julodis andreae derasa (Abeille, 1904)
- Julodis andreae lineigera (Marseul, 1865)
- Julodis andreae mandli (Pochon, 1967)
- Julodis andreae obesa Obenberger, 1923
- Julodis andreae obsoletesulcata Obenberger, 1917
- Julodis andreae scovitzi (Steven, 1830)
- Julodis andreae sulcata Redtenbacher, 1843
- Julodis andreae xanthographa (Faldermann, 1830

== Description ==
Julodis andreae can reach a length of 25–30 millimetres (0.98–1.18 in). Colors of these metallic wood-boring beetles are very variable, ranging from iridescent blue, green, yellowish green and copper. These colors are not due to pigments but to physical iridescence. Elytra show strong longitudinal ridges with whitish hairs.

== Distribution ==
This species can be found in Armenia, Syria, Iran and Turkey (South and Eastern Anatolia) .
