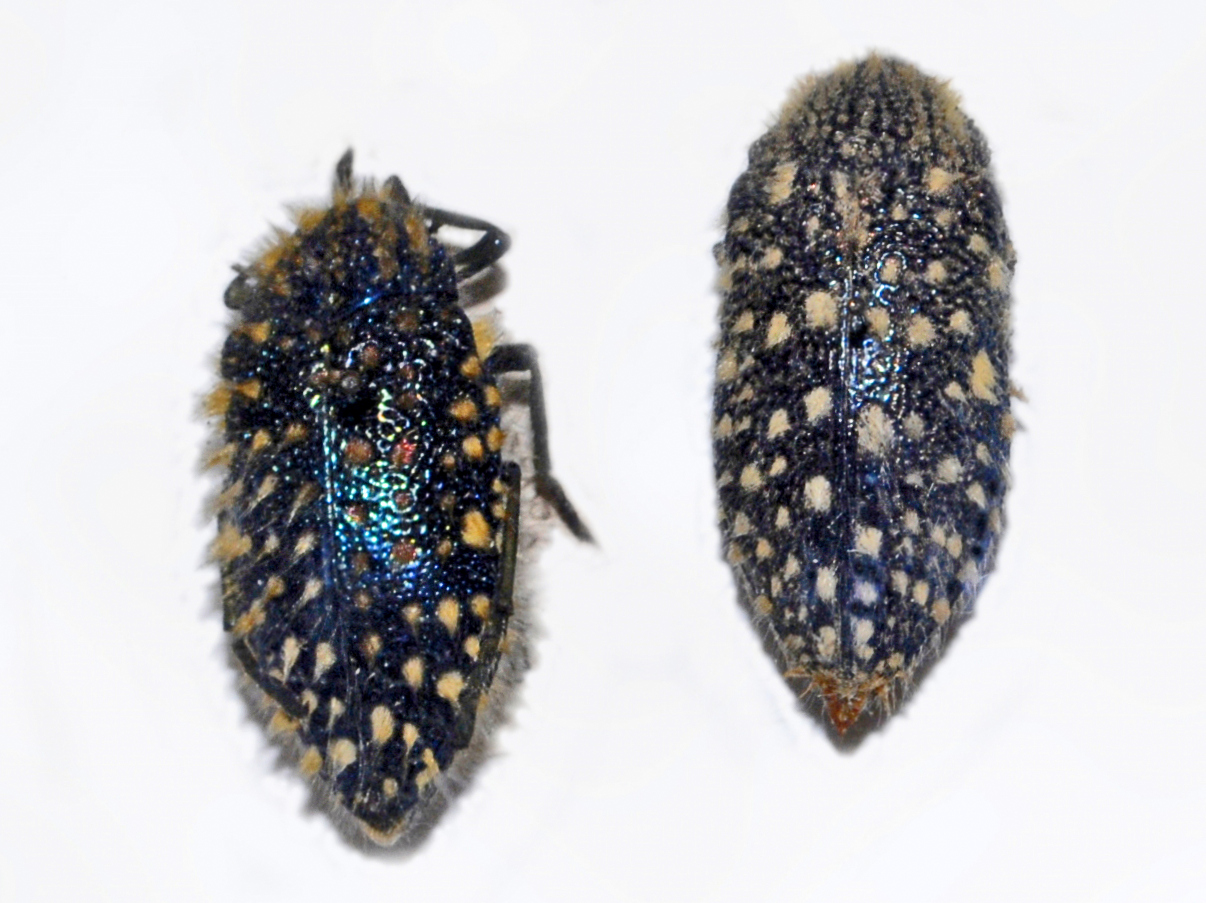
- Mounted specimen

Scientific classification
- Kingdom: Animalia
- Phylum: Arthropoda
- Clade: Pancrustacea
- Class: Insecta
- Order: Coleoptera
- Suborder: Polyphaga
- Infraorder: Elateriformia
- Family: Buprestidae
- Genus: Julodis
- Species: J. viridipes

Binomial name
- Julodis viridipes Laporte, 1835

Synonyms
- Julodis klugii Obenberger, 1936; Julodis schlechteri Peringuey, 1898

= Julodis viridipes =

Species of beetle

Julodis viridipes is a species of beetle belonging to the Buprestidae family.

== Description ==
Julodis viridipes can reach a length of about 22–36 millimetres (0.87–1.42 in). The basic color is blue. Head, thorax and abdomen are covered with tufts of yellow hair. Legs are green (hence the Latin name viridipes of the species).

== Distribution ==
This species can be found in South Africa and is associated with the woody shrub Didelta spinosa.
