= Beckhoplia pulchra =

Scientific classification
- Kingdom: Animalia
- Phylum: Arthropoda
- Clade: Pancrustacea
- Class: Insecta
- Order: Coleoptera
- Suborder: Polyphaga
- Infraorder: Scarabaeiformia
- Family: Scarabaeidae
- Genus: Beckhoplia
- Species: B. pulchra

Binomial name
- Beckhoplia pulchra Dombrow, 2020

Species of beetle

Beckhoplia pulchra is a species of beetle of the family Scarabaeidae. It is found in South Africa (Northern Cape). The habitat consists of Hantam Karroo.

== Description ==
Adults reach a length of about 7.8 mm (0.31 in). They are black with brown elytra.

== Life history ==
The recorded host plant is Babiana vanziliae.

== Etymology ==
The species name is derived from Latin pulchr- (meaning beautiful).
