= Stoeberia giftbergensis =

Scientific classification
- Kingdom: Plantae
- Clade: Tracheophytes
- Clade: Angiosperms
- Clade: Eudicots
- Order: Caryophyllales
- Family: Aizoaceae
- Genus: Stoeberia
- Species: S. giftbergensis

Binomial name
- Stoeberia giftbergensis (L.Bolus) Van Jaarsv.

Synonyms
- Ruschia utilis var. giftbergensis L.Bolus

Species of succulent

Stoeberia giftbergensis, the Gifberg tree-mesemb, is a shrub and is endemic to the Northern Cape. The tree's FSA number is 756.
