= Beckhoplia nigra =

Scientific classification
- Kingdom: Animalia
- Phylum: Arthropoda
- Class: Insecta
- Order: Coleoptera
- Suborder: Polyphaga
- Infraorder: Scarabaeiformia
- Family: Scarabaeidae
- Genus: Beckhoplia
- Species: B. nigra

Binomial name
- Beckhoplia nigra Dombrow, 2020

Species of beetle

Beckhoplia nigra is a species of beetle of the family Scarabaeidae. It is found in South Africa (Northern Cape). The habitat consists of Hantam Karroo.

== Description ==
Adults reach a length of about 7.5–7.9 mm (0.30–0.31 in). They are black with the colour of the elytra ranging from pale-brown medially to black at the lateral and posterior margins.

== Life history ==
The recorded host plant is Albuca canadensis.

== Etymology ==
The species name is derived from Latin nigr- (meaning black) and refers to the colour of the elytra.
