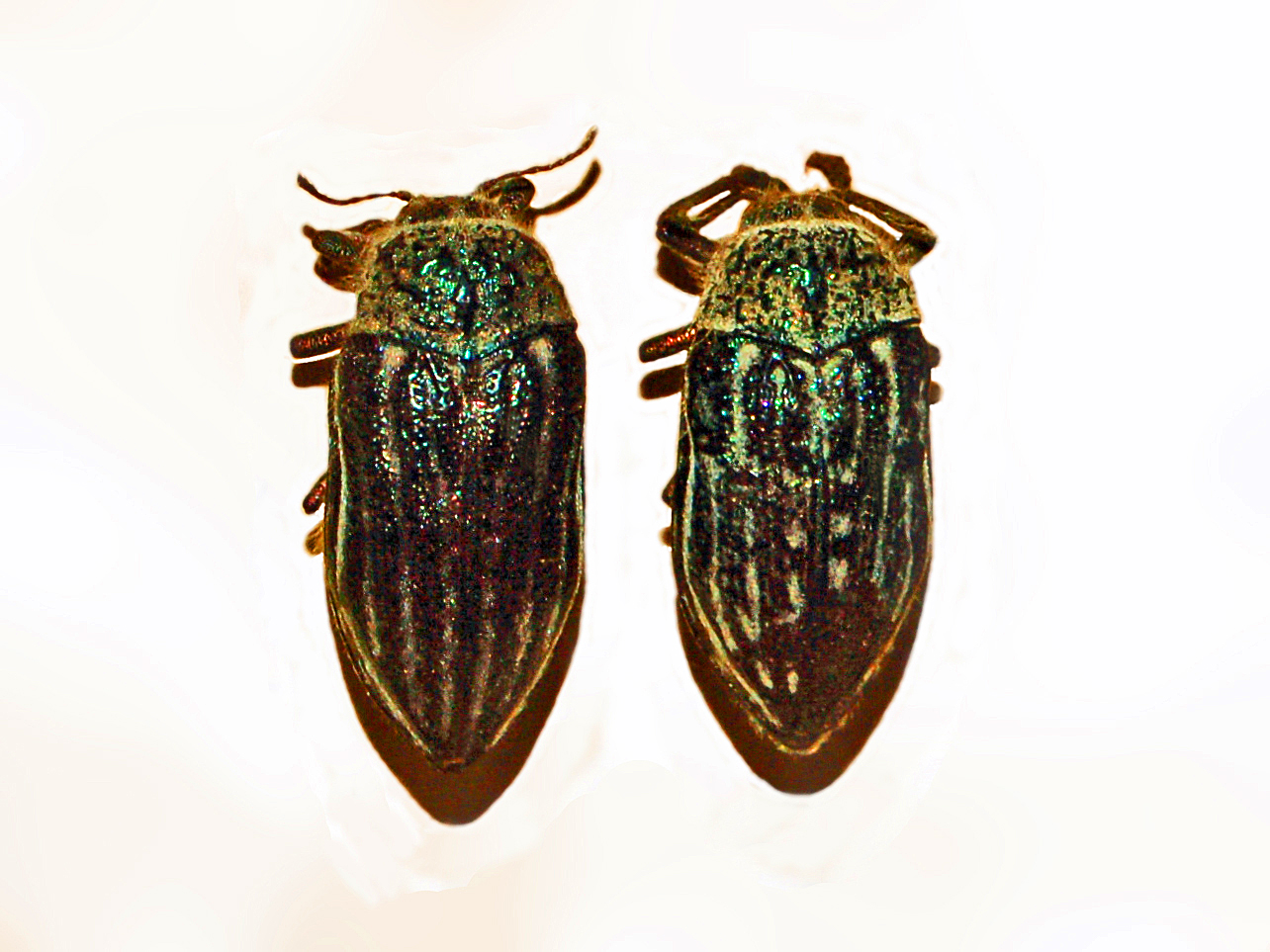
- Julodis onopordi from Tunisia

Scientific classification
- Kingdom: Animalia
- Phylum: Arthropoda
- Class: Insecta
- Order: Coleoptera
- Suborder: Polyphaga
- Infraorder: Elateriformia
- Family: Buprestidae
- Genus: Julodis
- Species: J. onopordi

Binomial name
- Julodis onopordi Fabricius, 1787

= Julodis onopordi =

Species of beetle

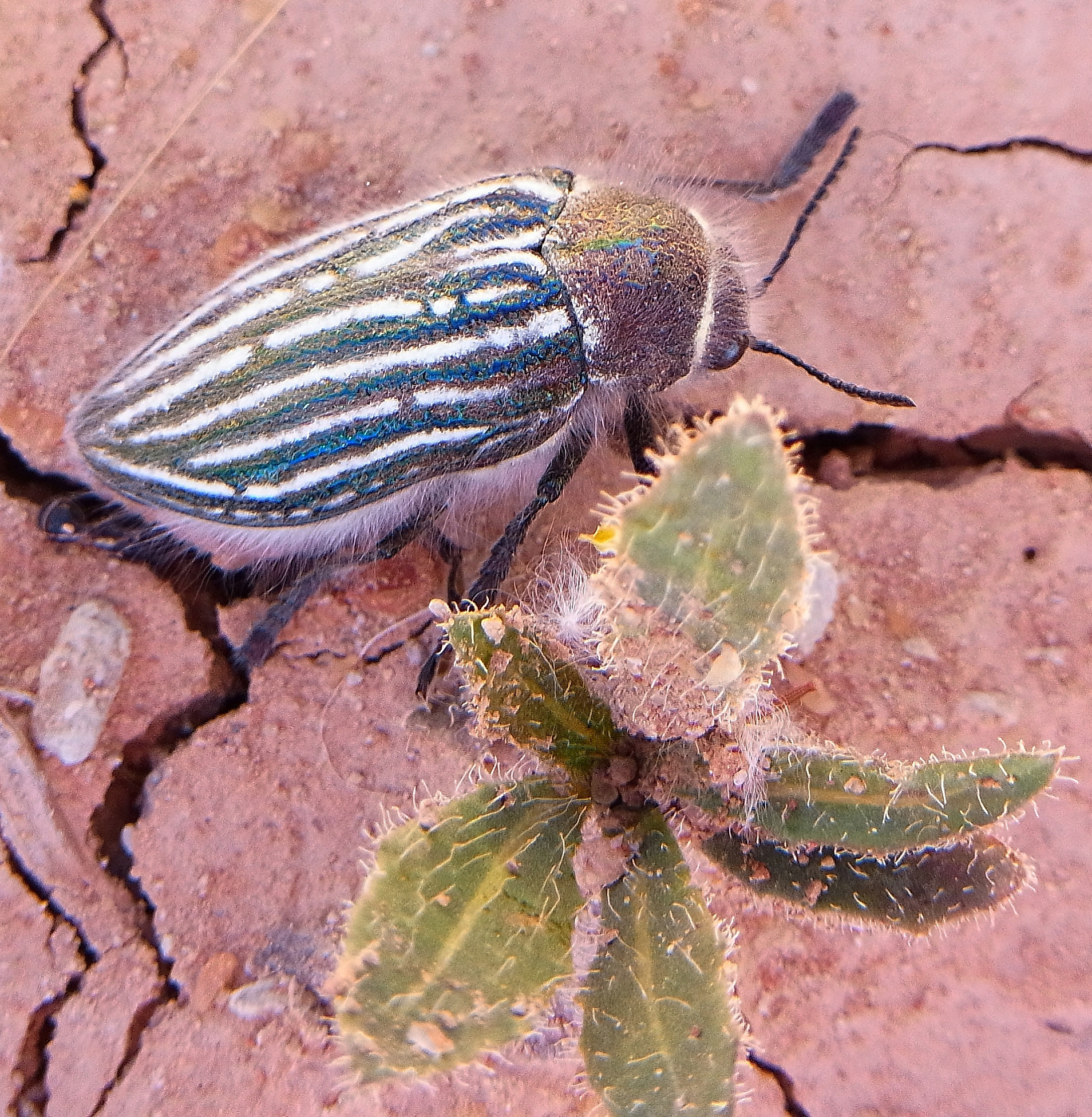

Julodis onopordi is a species of beetle belonging to the family Buprestidae.

== Description ==
Julodis onopordi reaches about 29 millimetres (1.1 in) in length. The coloration is metallic green.

== Distribution ==
This species occurs in France, Portugal, Spain, Sicily (Lampedusa) and in Egypt, Libya, Tunisia, Algeria, Morocco.

== List of subspecies ==
- Julodis onopordi chalcostigma Chevrolat, 1860
- Julodis onopordi longiseta Abeille de Perrin, 1904
- Julodis onopordi onopordi (Fabricius, 1787)
- Julodis onopordi sommeri Jaubert, 1858
- Julodis onopordi splichali Obenberger, 1917
- Julodis onopordi lampedusanus Tassi, 1966
