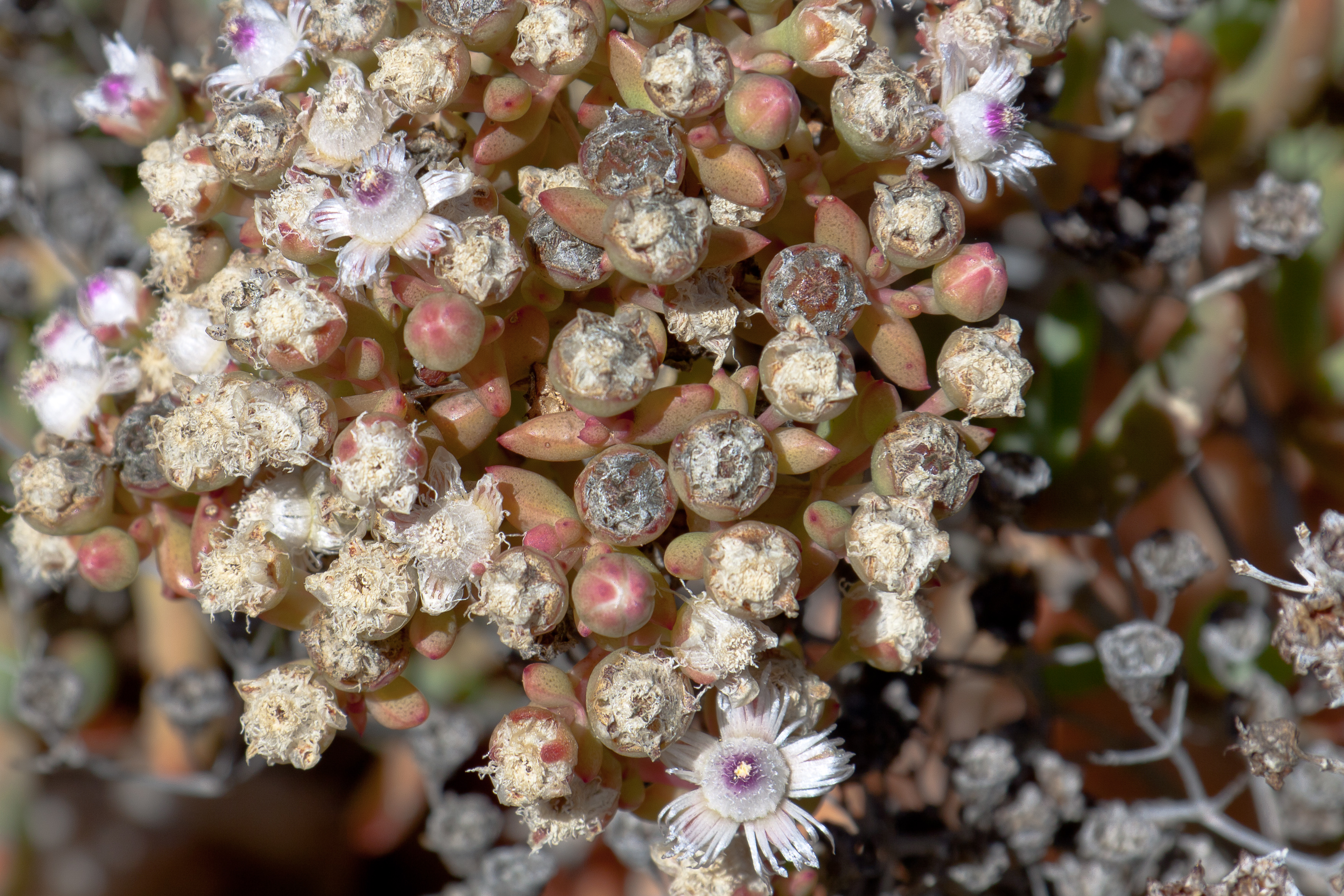
- Stoeberia fructescens

Scientific classification
- Kingdom: Plantae
- Clade: Tracheophytes
- Clade: Angiosperms
- Clade: Eudicots
- Order: Caryophyllales
- Family: Aizoaceae
- Subfamily: Ruschioideae
- Tribe: Ruschieae
- Genus: Stoeberia; Dinter & Schwantes

Synonyms
- Ruschianthemum Friedrich

= Stoeberia =

Genus of flowering plant

Stoeberia is a genus of flowering plants belonging to the family Aizoaceae.

It is native to Namibia and also the Cape Provinces in the South African Republic.

The genus name of Stoeberia is in honour of Ernst Stoeber (1889–1927?), a German teacher and botanist in Lüderitz in present-day Namibia. It was first described and published in Z. Sukkulentenk. Vol.3 on page 17 in 1927.

== Known species ==
According to Kew:

- Stoeberia arborea van Jaarsv.
- Stoeberia beetzii (Dinter) Dinter & Schwantes
- Stoeberia carpii Friedrich
- Stoeberia frutescens (L.Bolus) van Jaarsv.
- Stoeberia giftbergensis (L.Bolus) van Jaarsv.
- Stoeberia gigas (Dinter) Dinter & Schwantes
- Stoeberia utilis (L.Bolus) van Jaarsv.
