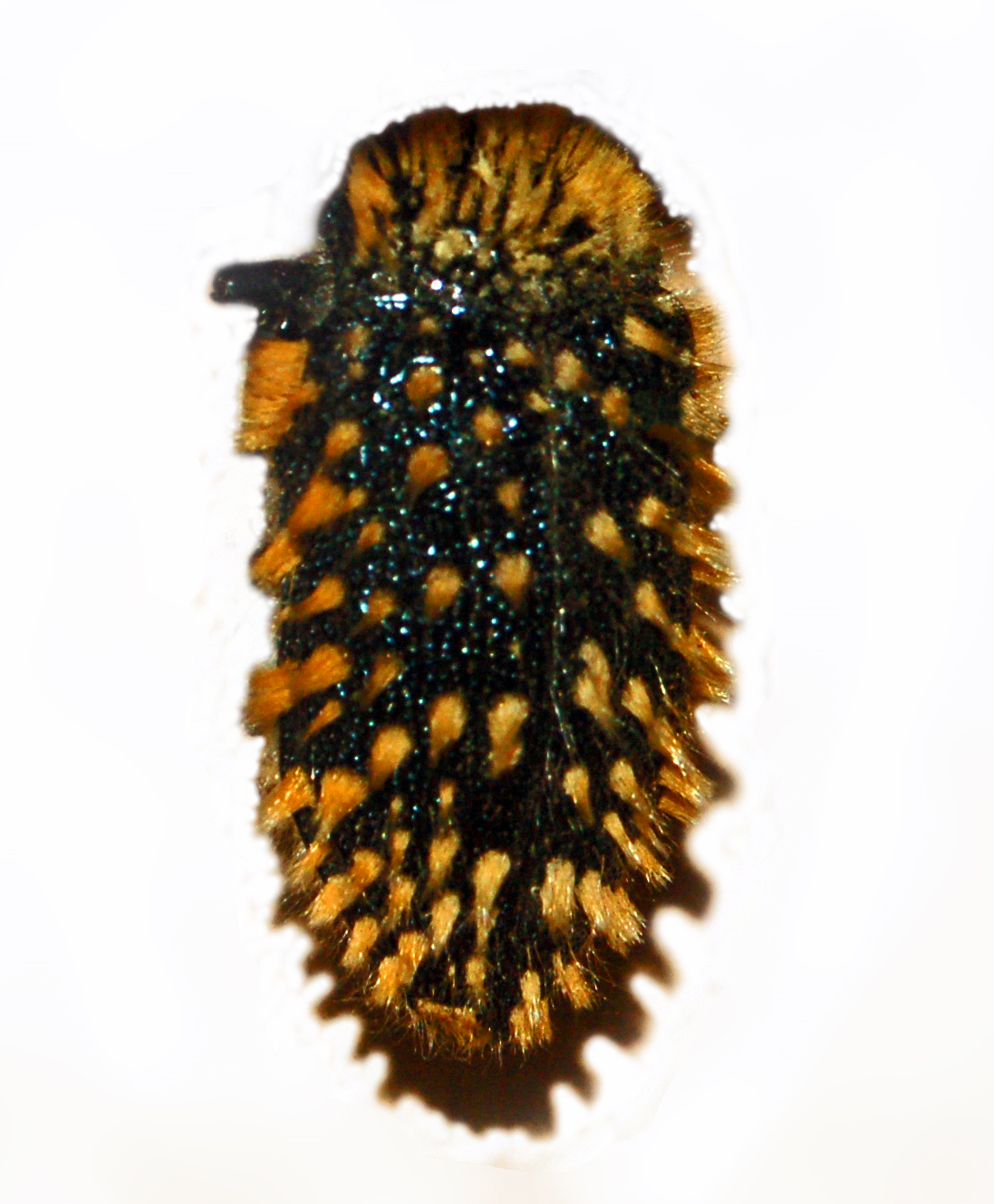
- Julodis cirrosa from South Africa

Scientific classification
- Domain: Eukaryota
- Kingdom: Animalia
- Phylum: Arthropoda
- Class: Insecta
- Order: Coleoptera
- Suborder: Polyphaga
- Infraorder: Elateriformia
- Family: Buprestidae
- Genus: Julodis
- Species: J. cirrosa

Binomial name
- Julodis cirrosa (Schönherr, 1817)

= Julodis cirrosa =

Species of beetle

Julodis cirrosa, the brush jewel beetle, is a species of beetles belonging to the Buprestidae family. This species occurs in Southern Africa.

== Description ==
Julodis cirrosa reaches about 27 millimetres (1.1 in) in length. The coloration is metallic blue-green, the surface is punctured and covered by yellowish-orange wax-coated hairs.

== List of subspecies ==
- Julodis cirrosa cirrosa (Schönherr, 1817)
- Julodis cirrosa hirtiventris Laporte, 1835
