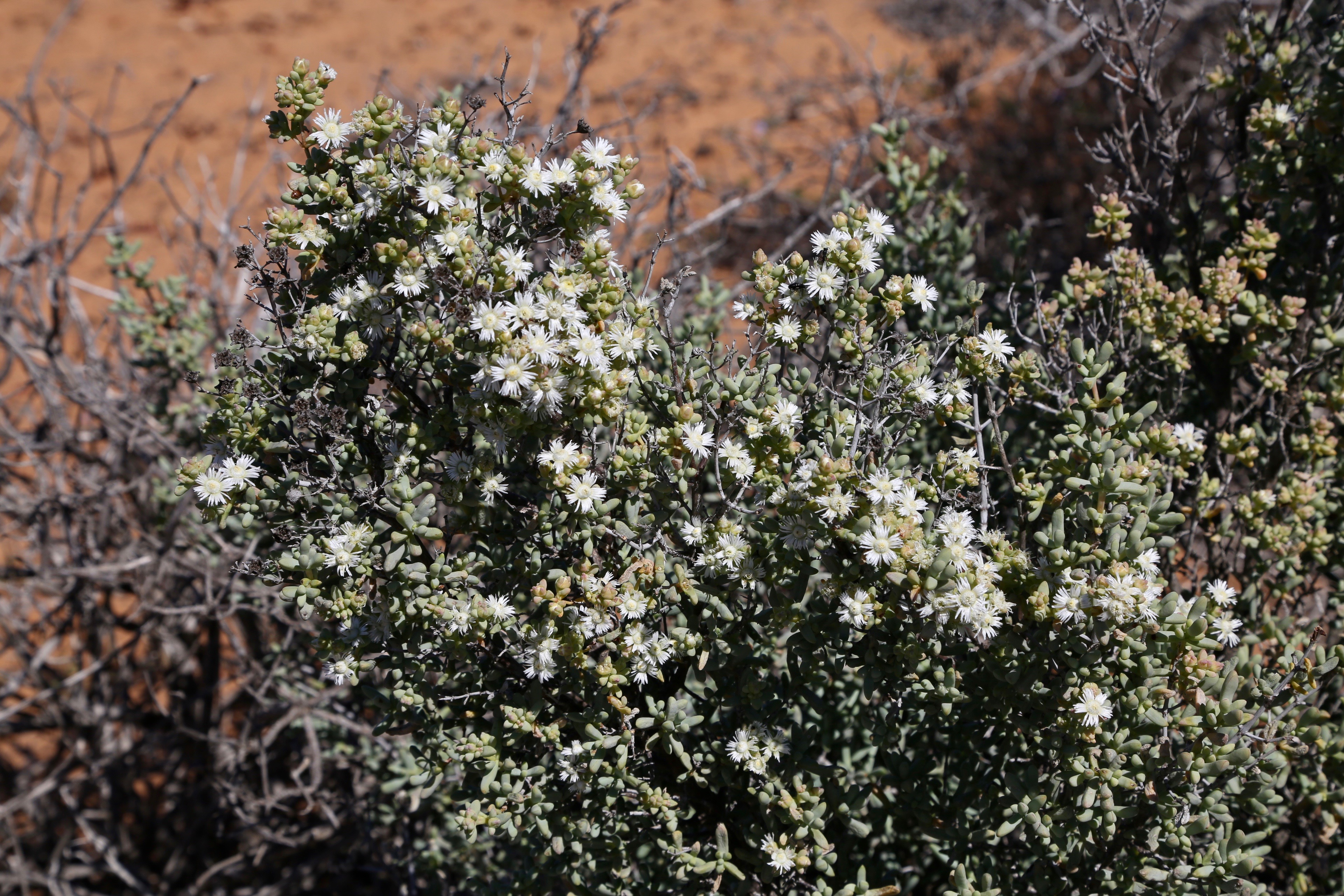

Scientific classification
- Kingdom: Plantae
- Clade: Tracheophytes
- Clade: Angiosperms
- Clade: Eudicots
- Order: Caryophyllales
- Family: Aizoaceae
- Genus: Stoeberia
- Species: S. utilis

Binomial name
- Stoeberia utilis (L.Bolus) van Jaarsv.

Synonyms
- Lampranthus utilis (L.Bolus) Schwantes; Mesembryanthemum utile L.Bolus; Ruschia utilis (L.Bolus) L.Bolus

= Stoeberia utilis =

Species of succulent

Stoeberia utilis, the red mesemb, is a tree that is native to the Northern Cape and the Western Cape as well as Namibia.

The tree's FSA number is 103.5.

\The plant has two subspecies:

- Stoeberia utilis subsp. lerouxiae van Jaarsv.
- Stoeberia utilis subsp. utilis
