= Stoeberia beetzii =

Scientific classification
- Kingdom: Plantae
- Clade: Tracheophytes
- Clade: Angiosperms
- Clade: Eudicots
- Order: Caryophyllales
- Family: Aizoaceae
- Genus: Stoeberia
- Species: S. beetzii

Binomial name
- Stoeberia beetzii (Dinter) Dinter & Schwantes

Synonyms
- Mesembryanthemum beetzii Dinter; Mesembryanthemum bicoloratum (L.Bolus) N.E.Br.; Mesembryanthemum micropetalum (L.Bolus) N.E.Br.; Mesembryanthemum translucens (L.Bolus) N.E.Br.; Ruschia bicolorata L.Bolus; Ruschia micropetala L.Bolus; Ruschia translucens L.Bolus; Stoeberia apetala L.Bolus

Species of succulent

Stoeberia beetzii, the vaal t'kooi, is a shrub native to the Northern Cape and Namibia. It primarily grows in deserts.
