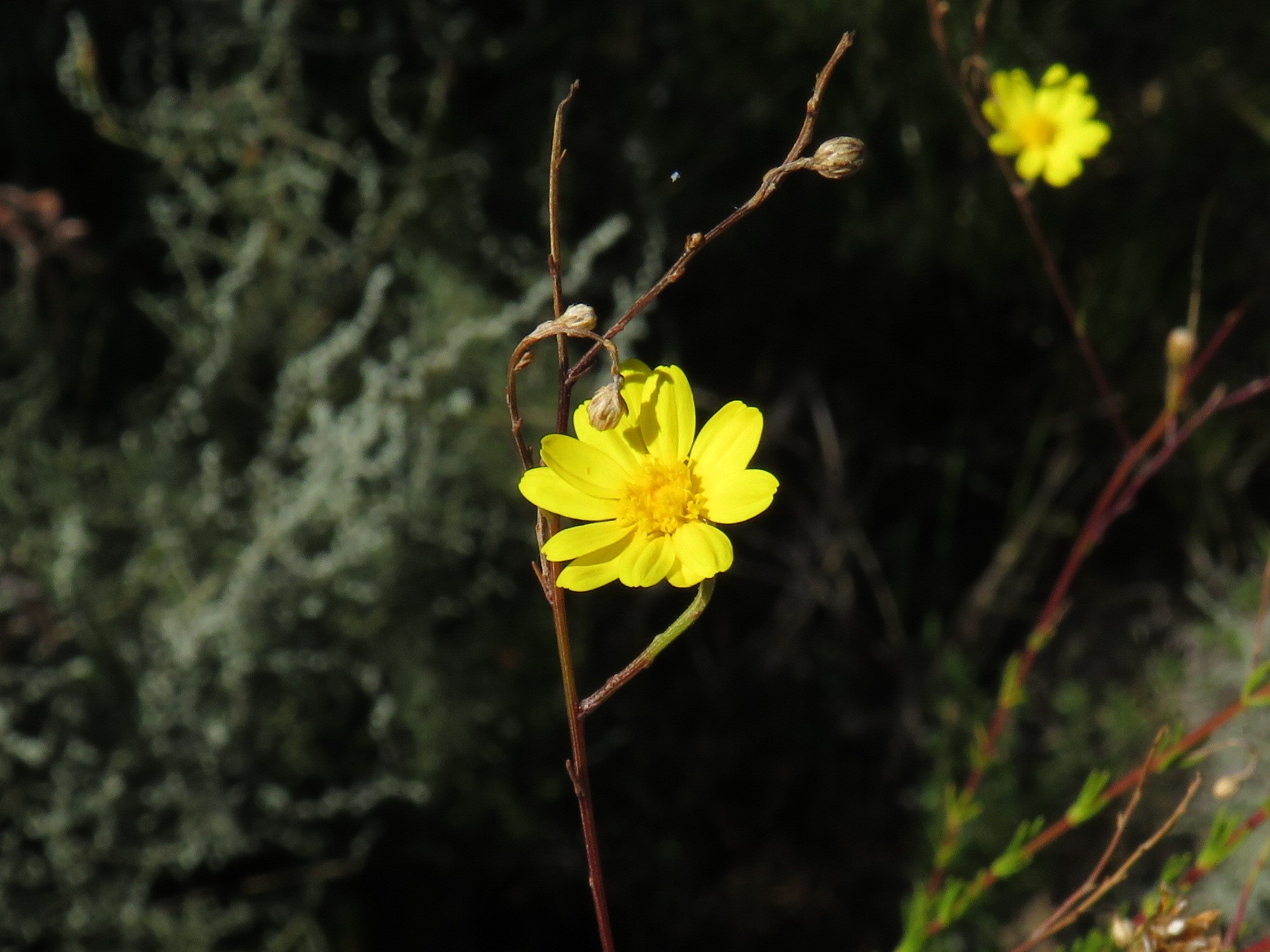

Scientific classification
- Kingdom: Plantae
- Clade: Tracheophytes
- Clade: Angiosperms
- Clade: Eudicots
- Clade: Asterids
- Order: Asterales
- Family: Asteraceae
- Genus: Ursinia
- Species: U. punctata

Binomial name
- Ursinia punctata (Thunb.) N.E.Br.

Synonyms
- Arctotis punctata Thunb.; Sphenogyne anethoides subsp. brachyglossa Thunb.; Sphenogyne anethoides subsp. ramossima DC.; Sphenogyne anethoides var. brachyglossa DC.; Sphenogyne anethoides var. ramossima DC.; Arctotis punctata DC.; Sphenogyne concolor Harv.; Sphenogyne gracilis DC.; Sphenogyne pauciloba DC.; Sphenogyne punctata (Thunb.) Less.; Ursinia concolor (Harv.) N.E.Br.; Ursinia pauciloba (DC.) N.E.Br.

= Ursinia punctata =

Species of plant from South Africa

Ursinia punctata is a species of plant belonging to the daisy family. It is found growing in South Africa, where it has a wide distribution.

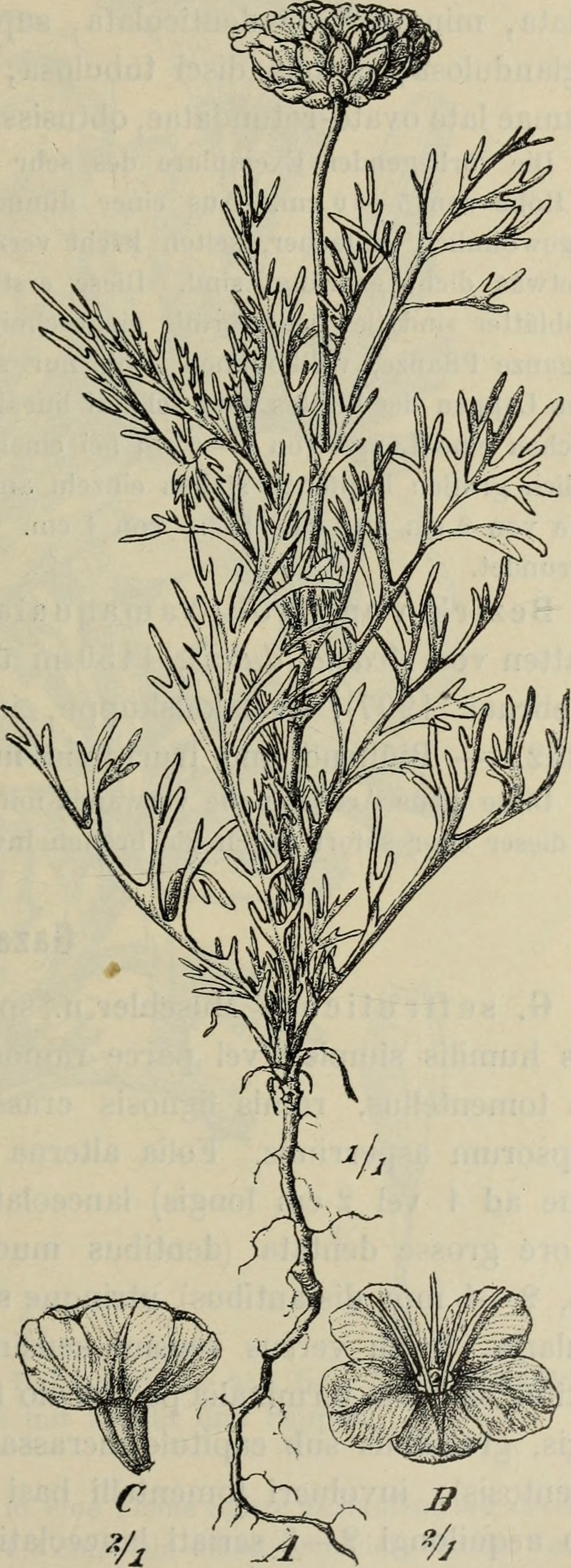
A diagram of Ursinia punctata showing the leaves, stems, flowers and roots

== Description ==
This erect or sprawling shrub has lightly hairy pinnatisect leaves (leaves that are split nearly to the midrib but do not form distinct leaflets). Solitary yellow flowerheads are borne on long wiry stems. The flowers are present in spring and summer - between September and March. It may be confused with Ursinia laciniata, although this species has a completely different distribution, or Ursinia glandulosa, which has unique stalked glands on the leaves and branches.

== Distribution and habitat ==
This species is endemic to South Africa, where it grows in the Northern Cape and Western Cape provinces. It is found growing from the Bokkeveld Mountains to Worcester and Swartberg where it grows on sandstone slopes.
