= Beckhoplia nigrosetosa =

Scientific classification
- Kingdom: Animalia
- Phylum: Arthropoda
- Class: Insecta
- Order: Coleoptera
- Suborder: Polyphaga
- Infraorder: Scarabaeiformia
- Family: Scarabaeidae
- Genus: Beckhoplia
- Species: B. nigrosetosa

Binomial name
- Beckhoplia nigrosetosa Dombrow, 2020

Species of beetle

Beckhoplia nigrosetosa is a species of beetle of the family Scarabaeidae. It is found in South Africa (Northern Cape). The habitat consists of Nieuwoudtville Shale Renosterveld.

== Description ==
Adults reach a length of about 7.6–8.4 mm (0.30–0.33 in) (males) and 8.4–9.4 mm (0.33–0.37 in) (females). They are black with pale brown elytra with blackened lateral and posterior margins. Females are black with pale brown elytra with only the lateral margins darkened.

== Life history ==
The recorded host plants are Gazania rigida and Senecio erosus.

== Etymology ==
The species name is derived from Latin nigr- (meaning black) and set (meaning a bristle) and refers to the black setae.
