= Beckhoplia castanea =

Scientific classification
- Kingdom: Animalia
- Phylum: Arthropoda
- Class: Insecta
- Order: Coleoptera
- Suborder: Polyphaga
- Infraorder: Scarabaeiformia
- Family: Scarabaeidae
- Genus: Beckhoplia
- Species: B. castanea

Binomial name
- Beckhoplia castanea Dombrow, 2020

Species of beetle

Beckhoplia castanea is a species of beetle of the family Scarabaeidae. It is found in South Africa (Northern Cape). The habitat consists of Nieuwoudtville Shale Renosterveld.

== Description ==
Adults reach a length of about 8.4–9.4 mm (0.33–0.37 in) (males) and 8.2–9.3 mm (0.32–0.37 in) (females). Males are black with pale-brown elytra, sometimes with blackened outer margins. Females are also black, but with red-brown elytra, which also sometimes have blackened outer margins.

== Life history ==
The recorded host plant is Bulbinella latifolia.

== Etymology ==
The species name is derived from Latin castane- (meaning brown) and refers to the colour of the elytra.
