= Beckhoplia julianae =

Scientific classification
- Kingdom: Animalia
- Phylum: Arthropoda
- Class: Insecta
- Order: Coleoptera
- Suborder: Polyphaga
- Infraorder: Scarabaeiformia
- Family: Scarabaeidae
- Genus: Beckhoplia
- Species: B. julianae

Binomial name
- Beckhoplia julianae Dombrow, 2005

Species of beetle

Beckhoplia julianae is a species of beetle of the family Scarabaeidae. It is found in South Africa (Northern Cape). The habitat consists of Namaqualand Blomveld.

== Description ==
Adults reach a length of about 7.6–8.2 mm (0.30–0.32 in). They are black with pale-brown elytra with broadly blackened lateral and posterior margins.

== Life history ==
The recorded host plant is Didelta carnosa.
