= Stoeberia carpii =

Scientific classification
- Kingdom: Plantae
- Clade: Tracheophytes
- Clade: Angiosperms
- Clade: Eudicots
- Order: Caryophyllales
- Family: Aizoaceae
- Genus: Stoeberia
- Species: S. carpii

Binomial name
- Stoeberia carpii Friedrich

Synonyms
- Jensenobotrya vanheerdei L.Bolus

Species of succulent

Stoeberia carpii is a shrub native to the Northern Cape and Namibia. The plant is threatened by droughts and grazing, especially in the Namibian portion of its habitat.
