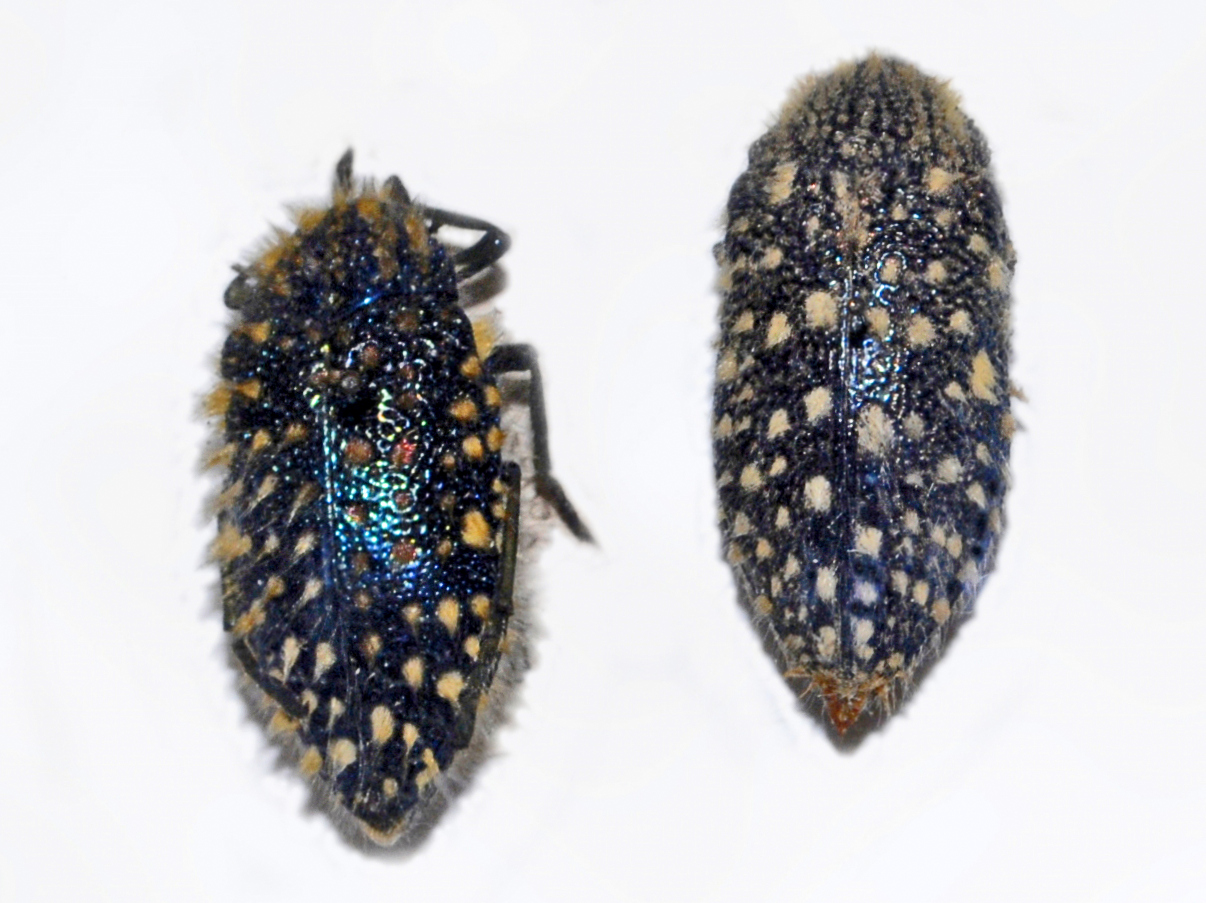
- Julodis viridipes

Scientific classification
- Kingdom: Animalia
- Phylum: Arthropoda
- Clade: Pancrustacea
- Class: Insecta
- Order: Coleoptera
- Suborder: Polyphaga
- Infraorder: Elateriformia
- Family: Buprestidae
- Subfamily: Julodinae
- Genus: Julodis; Eschscholtz, 1829

= Julodis =

Genus of beetles

Julodis is a genus of beetles in the family Buprestidae.

== List of species ==
Species:

- Julodis aeneipes Saunders, 1869
- Julodis aequinoctialis (Olivier, 1790)=
- Julodis algirica Laporte, 1835
- Julodis amoena Péringuey, 1898
- Julodis andreae (Olivier, 1790)
- Julodis angolensis Gussmann, 1995
- Julodis anthobia Obenberger, 1924
- Julodis aristidis Lucas, 1860
- Julodis armeniaca Marseul, 1865
- Julodis atkinsoni Kerremans, 1896
- Julodis audouinii Laporte & Gory, 1835
- Julodis balucha Obenberger, 1923
- Julodis bennigseni Obst, 1906
- Julodis bleusei Abeille de Perrin, 1896
- Julodis brevicollis Laporte & Gory, 1835
- Julodis caffer Laporte, 1835
- Julodis caillaudi (Latreille, 1823)
- Julodis candida Holynski, 1997
- Julodis chevrolatii Laporte, 1835
- Julodis chrysesthes Chevrolat, 1860
- Julodis cirrosa (Schönherr, 1817)
- Julodis clouei Buquet, 1843
- Julodis confusa Gussmann, 1995
- Julodis consobrina Kerremans, 1914
- Julodis cylindrica Théry, 1925
- Julodis dejagerae Gussmann, 1995
- Julodis desertica Ferreira & da Veiga-Ferreira, 1958
- Julodis egho Gory, 1840
- Julodis ehrenbergii Laporte, 1835
- Julodis escalerae Abeille de Perrin, 1904
- Julodis euphratica Laporte & Gory, 1835
- Julodis faldermanni Mannerheim, 1837
- Julodis fascicularis (Linnaeus, 1758)
- Julodis fidelissima Rosenhauer, 1856
- Julodis fimbriata (Klug, 1829)
- Julodis gariepina Péringuey, 1885
- Julodis hirsuta (Herbst, 1786)
- Julodis hoehnelii Fairmaire, 1891
- Julodis humeralis Gory, 1840
- Julodis interpunctata Thomson, 1878
- Julodis intricata Redtenbacher, 1843
- Julodis iris Laporte & Gory, 1835
- Julodis kabakovi Alexeev in Alexeev, et al., 1990
- Julodis kerimi Fairmaire, 1875
- Julodis klapperichi Cobos, 1966
- Julodis laevicostata Gory, 1840
- Julodis longicollis Abeille de Perrin, 1904
- Julodis lucasi Saunders, 1871
- Julodis manipularis (Fabricius, 1798)
- Julodis marmorea Kerremans, 1914
- Julodis marmottani Escalera, 1918
- Julodis matthiesseni Reitter, 1905
- Julodis mitifica Boheman, 1860
- Julodis namibiensis Gussmann, 1995
- Julodis nemethi Théry, 1932
- Julodis onopordi (Fabricius, 1787)
- Julodis oweni Gussmann, 1995
- Julodis partha Obenberger, 1923
- Julodis peregrina Chevrolat, 1838
- Julodis pietzchmanni Kerremans, 1914
- Julodis pilosa (Fabricius, 1798)
- Julodis proxima Gory, 1840
- Julodis pubescens (Olivier, 1790)
- Julodis punctatocostata Gory, 1840
- Julodis recenta Gussmann, 1995
- Julodis rothii Sturm, 1843
- Julodis speculifer Laporte, 1835
- Julodis subbrevicollis Théry, 1936
- Julodis sulcicollis Laporte & Gory, 1835
- Julodis syriaca (Olivier, 1790)
- Julodis turbulenta Gussmann, 1995
- Julodis vansoni Obenberger, 1936
- Julodis variolaris (Pallas, 1773)
- Julodis viridipes Laporte, 1835
- Julodis whitehillii (Gray, 1832)
- Julodis zablodskii Motschulsky, 1845
