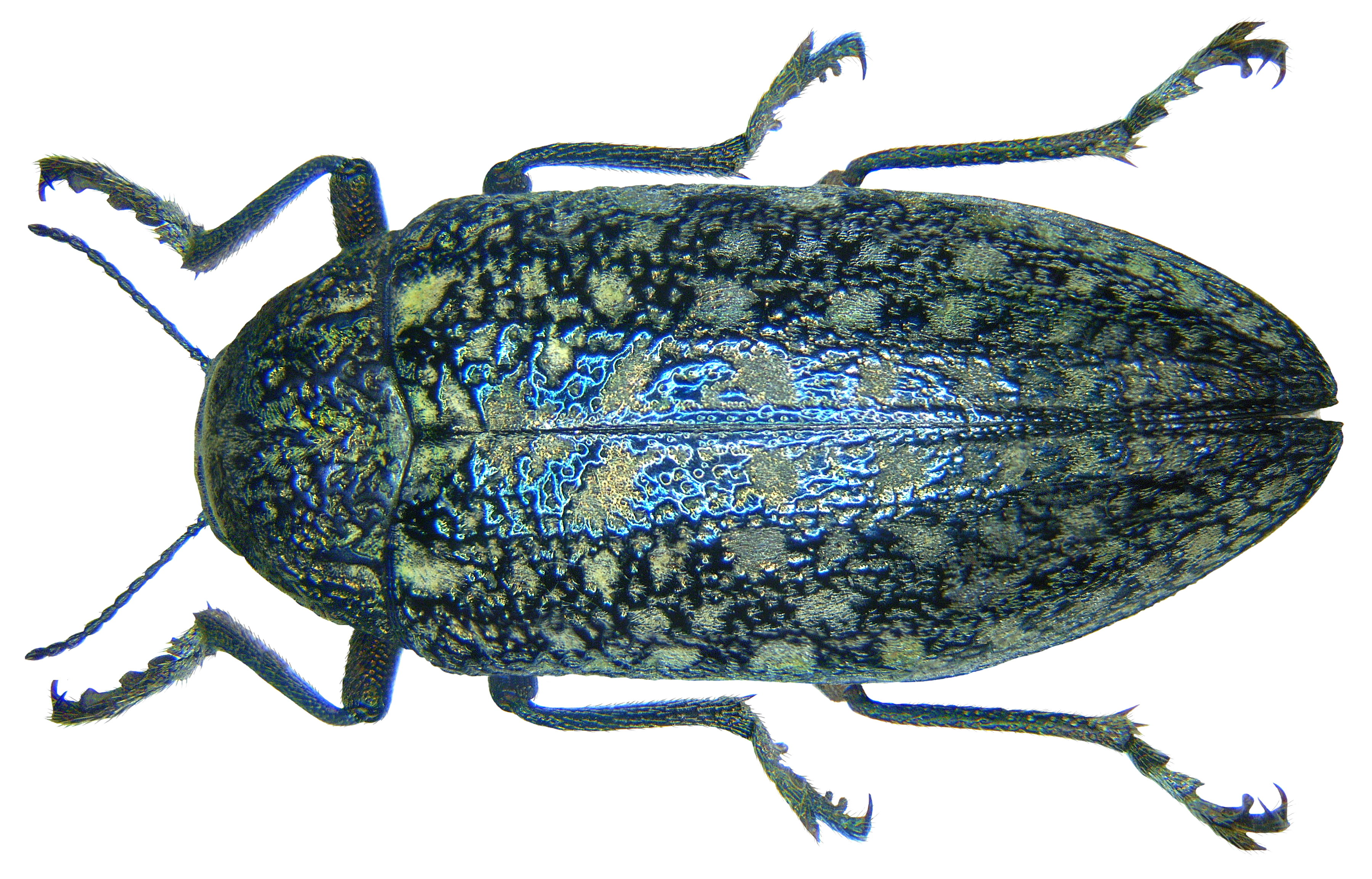

Scientific classification
- Kingdom: Animalia
- Phylum: Arthropoda
- Class: Insecta
- Order: Coleoptera
- Suborder: Polyphaga
- Infraorder: Elateriformia
- Family: Buprestidae
- Genus: Julodis
- Species: J. euphratica

Binomial name
- Julodis euphratica Laporte & Gory, 1835

= Julodis euphratica =

Species of beetle

Julodis euphratica also known as the Sulphrous jewel beetle or Euphratic jewel beetle, is a species of beetle in the family Buprestidae. It measures from 29 to 31 mm. It feeds on nectar from wild flowers. The larvae of these beetles live in acacia trees, where they spend the year before pupating and emerging in the early spring to mate. The larval stage lasts about 9 months and the adults live for 3 months. The total lifespan of the beetle from egg to adult and death is approximately a year in length.
