= Beckhoplia =

Scientific classification
- Kingdom: Animalia
- Phylum: Arthropoda
- Class: Insecta
- Order: Coleoptera
- Suborder: Polyphaga
- Infraorder: Scarabaeiformia
- Family: Scarabaeidae
- Subfamily: Melolonthinae
- Tribe: Hopliini
- Genus: Beckhoplia; Dombrow, 2003

Genus beetles

Beckhoplia is a genus of beetles belonging to the family Scarabaeidae.

== Species ==
- Beckhoplia bicolor Dombrow, 2020
- Beckhoplia caliginosa Dombrow, 2020
- Beckhoplia castanea Dombrow, 2020
- Beckhoplia colvillei Dombrow, 2005
- Beckhoplia dolichiocnemis Dombrow, 2020
- Beckhoplia elkeae Dombrow, 2020
- Beckhoplia fusca Dombrow, 2020
- Beckhoplia gifbergensis Dombrow, 2020
- Beckhoplia julianae Dombrow, 2005
- Beckhoplia nigra Dombrow, 2020
- Beckhoplia nigrofasciata Dombrow, 2020
- Beckhoplia nigrosetosa Dombrow, 2020
- Beckhoplia occidentalis Dombrow, 2005
- Beckhoplia pallidibrunnea Dombrow, 2020
- Beckhoplia pulchra Dombrow, 2020
- Beckhoplia pumila Dombrow, 2020
- Beckhoplia setosa Dombrow, 2020
- Beckhoplia suturalis Dombrow, 2020
