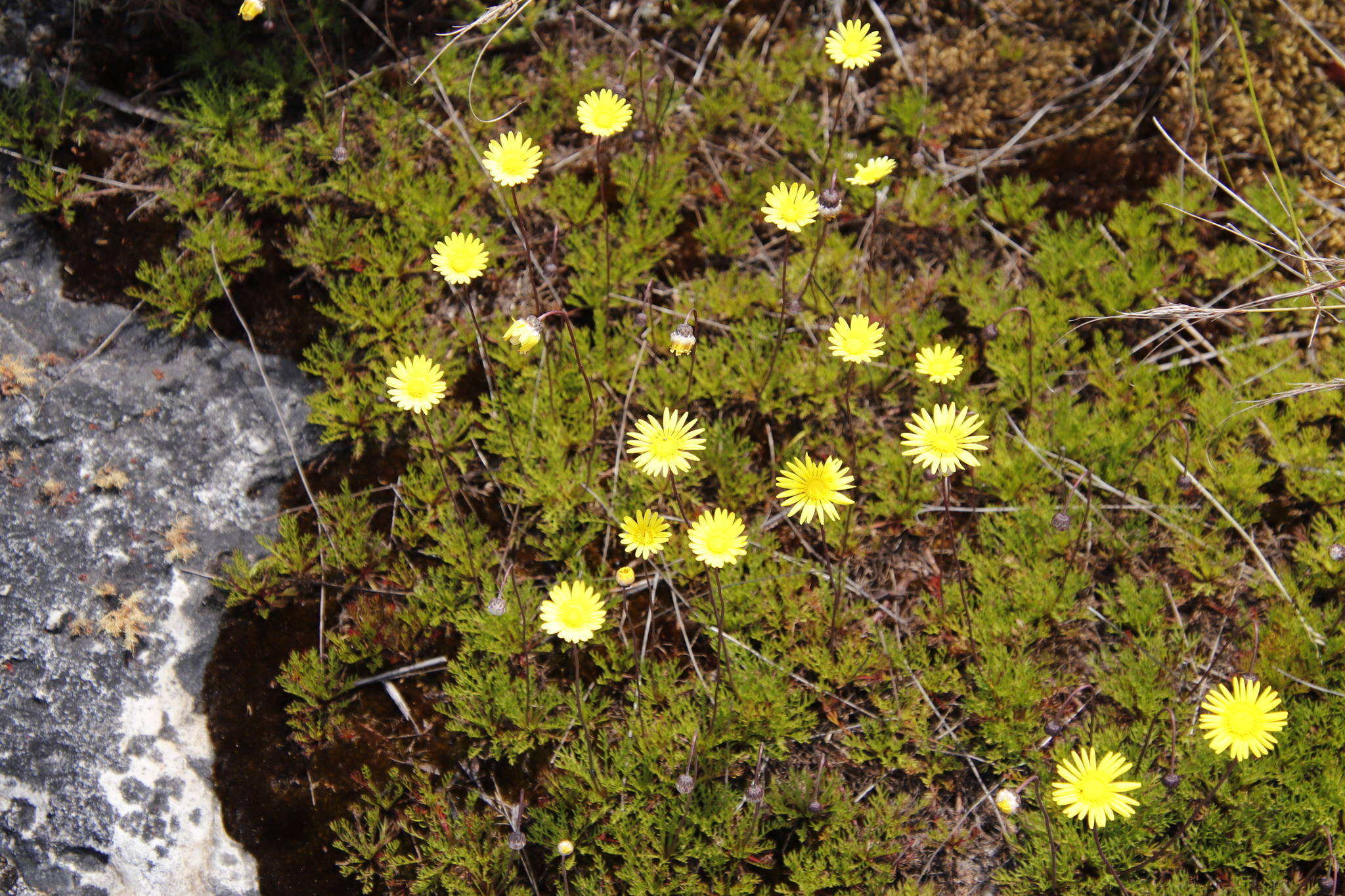

Scientific classification
- Kingdom: Plantae
- Clade: Embryophytes
- Clade: Tracheophytes
- Clade: Angiosperms
- Clade: Eudicots
- Clade: Asterids
- Order: Asterales
- Family: Asteraceae
- Genus: Ursinia
- Species: U. nudicaulis

Binomial name
- Ursinia nudicaulis (Thunb.) N.E.Br.

Synonyms
- Arctotis nudicaulis Thunb.; Sphenogyne chamomillaefolia DC.; Sphenogyne chamomillaefolia subsp. elongata Harv.; Sphenogyne chamomillaefolia var. chamomillaefolia; Sphenogyne chamomillaefolia var. elongata Harv.; Sphenogyne chamomillaefolia DC.; Sphenogyne chamomillifolia var. elongata Harv.; Sphenogyne kraussii Sch.Bip.; Sphenogyne nudicaulis (Thunb.) Less.; Sphenogyne nudicaulis subsp. alpina Harv.; Sphenogyne nudicaulis subsp. gracilior Harv.; Sphenogyne nudicaulis var. alpina Harv.; Sphenogyne nudicaulis var. gracilior Harv.; Sphenogyne nudicaulis var. nudicaulis; Sphenogyne scapiformis DC.; Ursinia chamomillifolia (DC.) N.E.Br.; Ursinia scapiformis (DC.) N.E.Br.

= Ursinia nudicaulis =

South African plant species

Ursinia nudicaulis, also known as the longstalk paraseed or the little daisy, is a species of plant from South Africa. It belongs to the daisy family.

== Description ==
This tufted shrub grows up to 0.5 m (1.6 ft) tall. The leaves are densely crowded below. The linear lobes are divided to the midrib. Solitary radiate flowerheads are borne on long, hairless stems. They are yellow in colour and are surrounded by bracts that are often papery above. They are 15–30 mm (0.59–1.18 in) in diameter and are present between September and March. The outer and middle bracts have black margins. The pappus (modified calyx) has five scales. It is white with brown spots towards the base. The seeds are slightly curved with a spiral wall thickening at the base.

== Distribution and habitat, ==
This species is found growing between the Cedarberg and Witteberg, and Humansdorp and the Cape Peninsula. It mainly grows on sandstone slopes, but it has also been found growing in wet areas such as riverbeds, including those in indigenous forests.

== Ecology ==
This plant plays an important role in the early stages of the transition in community structure in primary succession in the fynbos biome. It grows in the soil that accumulates in the initial moss mat, paving the way for the restionaceous plants that utilise the soil that builds up in this process.

== Chemistry ==
As with many plants of this genus, Ursinia nudicaulis contains many chemical compounds. These include germacrene D, taraxasteryl acetate and caryophyllene. There may, however, be regional differences in which compounds the plants contain as a sample taken from Humansdorp contained laurenobiolide and germacranolides, which were not found in a sample collected from the Viljoens Pass, which spans from Grabouw to the Hottentots Holland Nature Reserve.
