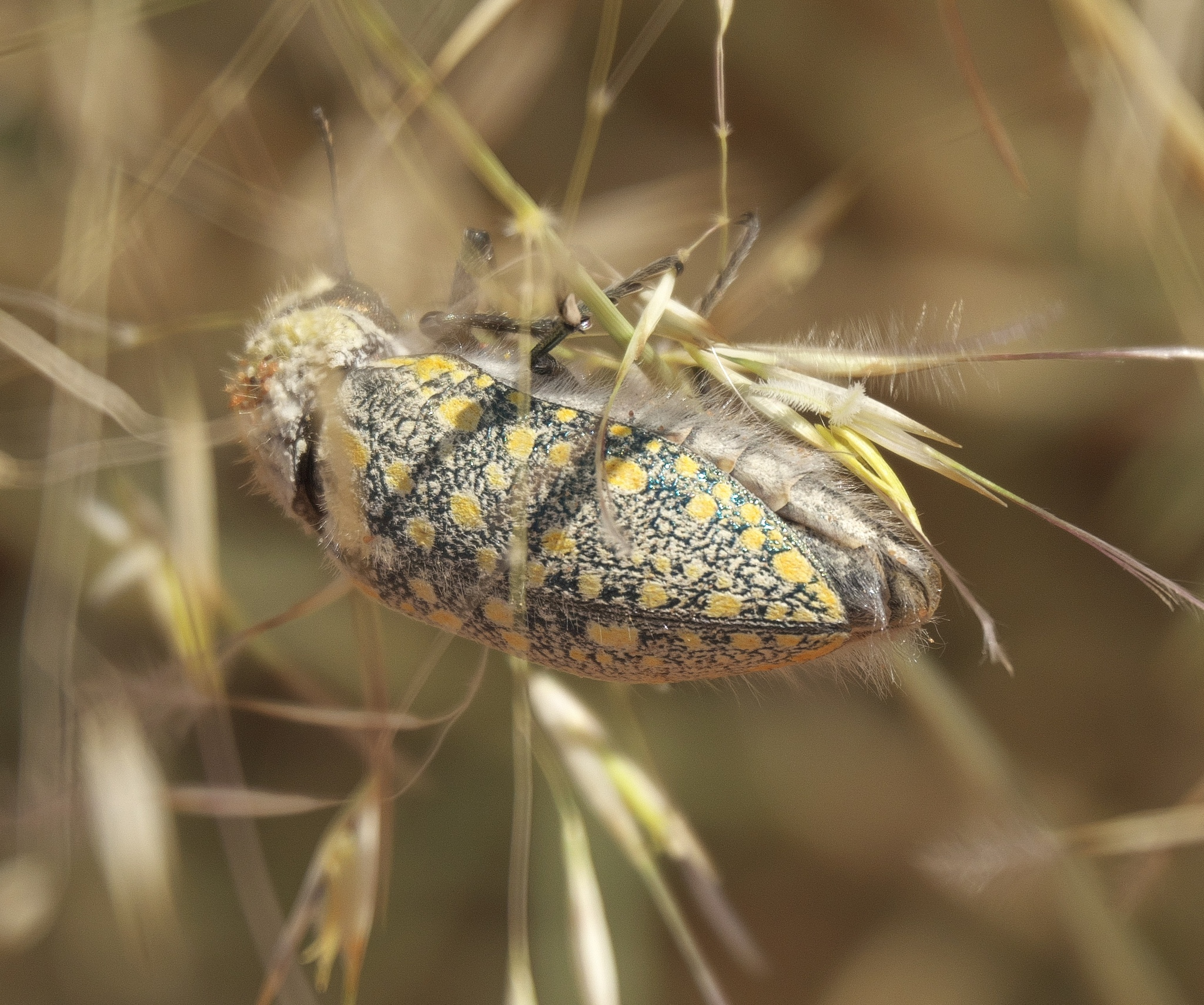
- Julodis mitifica, Namibia

Scientific classification
- Kingdom: Animalia
- Phylum: Arthropoda
- Class: Insecta
- Order: Coleoptera
- Suborder: Polyphaga
- Infraorder: Elateriformia
- Family: Buprestidae
- Subfamily: Julodinae
- Genus: Julodis
- Species: J. mitifica

Binomial name
- Julodis mitifica Boheman, 1860

Synonyms
- Julodis kochi Ferreira & da Veiga-Ferreira, 1958

= Julodis mitifica =

Species of beetles

Julodis mitifica is a species in the beetle family Buprestidae. It is endemic to Namibia.

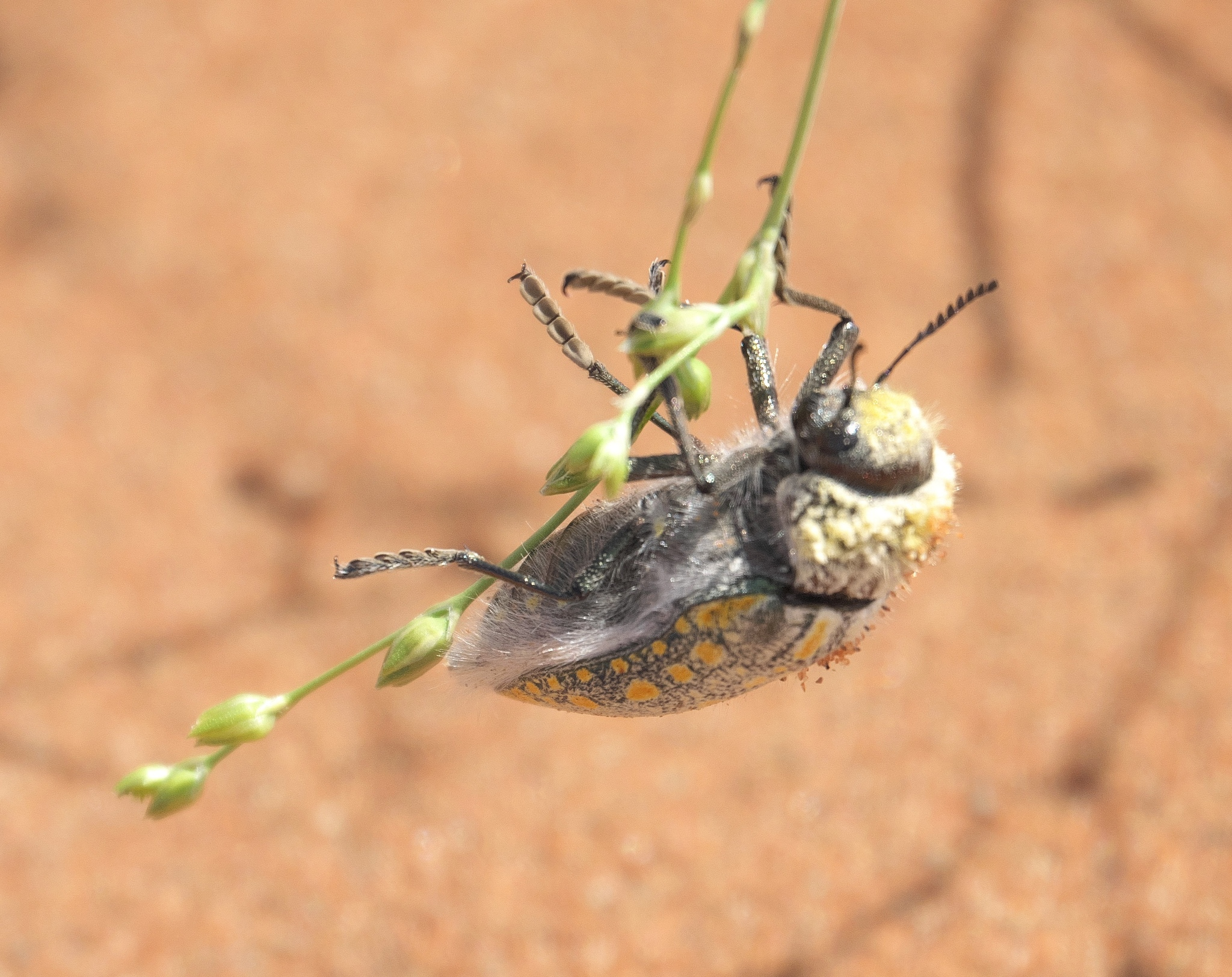
Julodis mitifica, Namibia
