= Stoeberia gigas =

Scientific classification
- Kingdom: Plantae
- Clade: Tracheophytes
- Clade: Angiosperms
- Clade: Eudicots
- Order: Caryophyllales
- Family: Aizoaceae
- Genus: Stoeberia
- Species: S. gigas

Binomial name
- Stoeberia gigas (Dinter) Dinter & Schwantes

Synonyms
- Mesembryanthemum gigas Dinter; Ruschianthemum gigas (Dinter) Friedrich

Species of succulent

Stoeberia gigas, synonym Ruschianthemum gigas, is a shrub native to the Northern Cape and Namibia. It primarily grows in deserts.
