= Stoeberia arborea =

Scientific classification
- Kingdom: Plantae
- Clade: Tracheophytes
- Clade: Angiosperms
- Clade: Eudicots
- Order: Caryophyllales
- Family: Aizoaceae
- Genus: Stoeberia
- Species: S. arborea

Binomial name
- Stoeberia arborea Van Jaarsv.

Synonyms
- Stoeberia porphyrea H.E.K.Hartmann

Species of succulent

Stoeberia arborea is a shrub and the largest member of the Aizoaceae family. It is found in the Northern Cape, Western Cape and Namibia, most commonly in the Richtersveld. The shrub grows to a height of 5 m and its FSA number is 103.4. The shrub bears small white flowers and flowers from July to August.
