= Beckhoplia colvillei =

Scientific classification
- Kingdom: Animalia
- Phylum: Arthropoda
- Class: Insecta
- Order: Coleoptera
- Suborder: Polyphaga
- Infraorder: Scarabaeiformia
- Family: Scarabaeidae
- Genus: Beckhoplia
- Species: B. colvillei

Binomial name
- Beckhoplia colvillei Dombrow, 2005

Species of beetle

Beckhoplia colvillei is a species of beetle of the family Scarabaeidae. It is found in South Africa (Northern Cape, Western Cape). The habitat consists of Nieuwoudtville Shale Renosterveld.

== Description ==
Adults reach a length of about 6.7–8.4 mm (0.26–0.33 in) (males) and 8.5–9.3 mm (0.33–0.37 in) (females). They are black with pale-brown elytra, sometimes with blackened margins.

== Life history ==
The recorded host plant is Gazania rigida.
