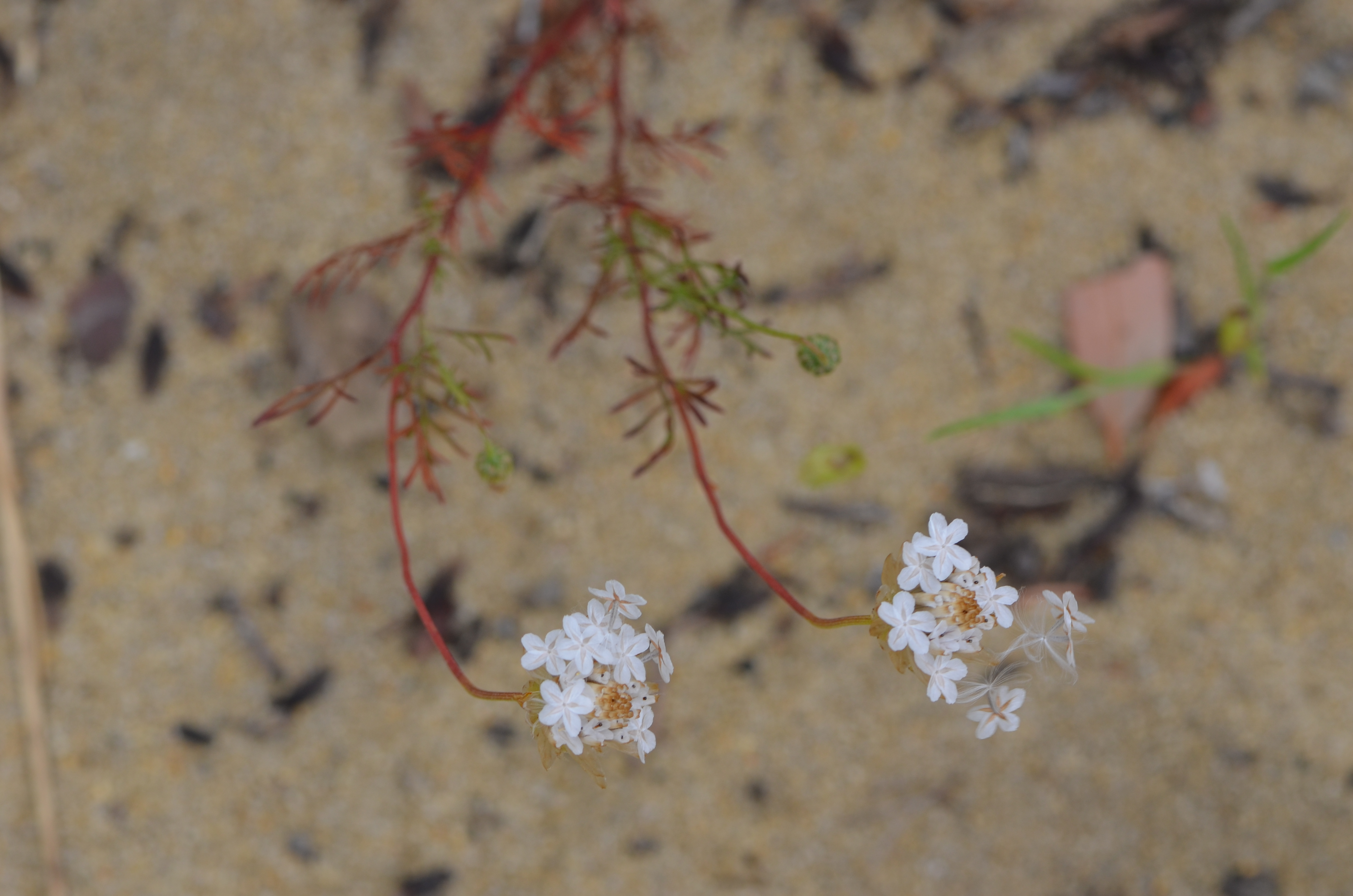

Scientific classification
- Kingdom: Plantae
- Clade: Tracheophytes
- Clade: Angiosperms
- Clade: Eudicots
- Clade: Asterids
- Order: Asterales
- Family: Asteraceae
- Genus: Ursinia
- Species: U. anthemoides

Binomial name
- Ursinia anthemoides (L.) Poir.

Synonyms
- Arctotis anthemoides L. (1759); Leptotis anthemoides (L.) Hoffmanns. (1824); Sphenogyne anthemoides (L.) R.Br. (1813)

= Ursinia anthemoides =

Species of flowering plant

Ursinia anthemoides or solar fire is an annual, herbaceous flowering plant of the genus Ursinia, native to the Cape Provinces of South Africa. It has yellow or orange daisy-like inflorescences. Fruits have both pappus and hairs, making the seeds easily dispersed by wind.

There are two known subspecies:

- Ursinia anthemoides subsp. anthemoides
- Ursinia anthemoides subsp. versicolor (DC.) Prassler

It was first described by Carl Linnaeus in the 1759 10th edition of Systema Naturae.

External images
- A patch of solar fire
- A closeup of solar fire
