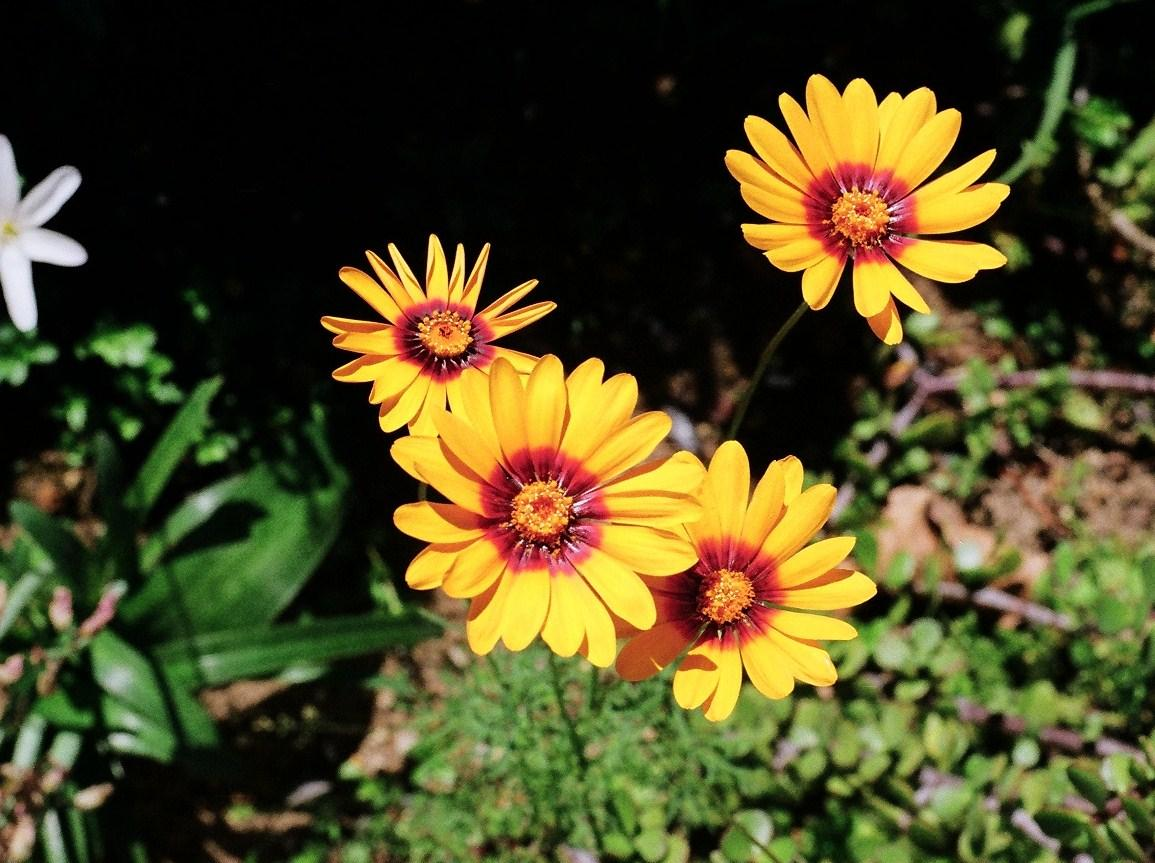
- Ursinia calenduliflora

Scientific classification
- Kingdom: Plantae
- Clade: Tracheophytes
- Clade: Angiosperms
- Clade: Eudicots
- Clade: Asterids
- Order: Asterales
- Family: Asteraceae
- Subfamily: Asteroideae
- Tribe: Anthemideae
- Genus: Ursinia; Gaertn.

Type species
- Ursinia paradoxa (L.) Gaertn.

Synonyms
- Sphenogyne R.Br.; Ursiniopsis E.Phillips; Chronobasis DC. ex Benth. & Hook.f.

= Ursinia =

Genus of flowering plants

Ursinia is a genus of African plants in the chamomile tribe within the daisy family. The genus is named in honor of German scholar Johannes Heinrich Ursinus 1608–1667.

== Characteristics ==
This genus consists of annual or perennial herbs and shrubs.

=== Leaves ===
The leaves are usually alternately with toothed margins.

=== Flowers ===
The flowers are borne in round flower heads. They are usually medium sized or large, but may also rarely be small. Most species have long floral stems. There are many rows of bracts. These get shorter towards the outside.

The florets of the flowerheads are not all of the same sex. There is only one row of ray (outer) florets. The corolla is strap shaped. The blades of the petals may have three small teeth at the end.

The disc florets are bisexual, although those at the center may be sterile. The corolla has a slender tube that widens at the base.

The achenes (small, dry fruits that contain a single seed) have five to ten ridges and are narrower towards the base. The base may be surrounded by long hairs.

== Distribution ==
This species is currently known from Africa with 65 species in South Africa (mostly in coastal regions) and one species from Ethiopia.

== Species ==
The following species are accepted:

- Ursinia abrotanifolia
- Ursinia alpina
- Ursinia anethoides
- Ursinia anthemoides
- Ursinia brachyloba
- Ursinia cakilefolia
- Ursinia caledonica
- Ursinia calenduliflora
- Ursinia chrysanthemoides
- Ursinia coronopifolia
- Ursinia dentata
- Ursinia discolor
- Ursinia dregeana
- Ursinia eckloniana
- Ursinia filipes
- Ursinia foeniculacea
- Ursinia frutescens
- Ursinia heterodonta
- Ursinia hispida
- Ursinia macropoda
- Ursinia merxmuelleri
- Ursinia montana
- Ursinia nana
- Ursinia nudicaulis
- Ursinia odorata
- Ursinia oreogena
- Ursinia paleacea
- Ursinia paradoxa
- Ursinia pilifera
- Ursinia pinnata
- Ursinia punctata
- Ursinia pygmaea
- Ursinia quinquepartita
- Ursinia rigidula
- Ursinia saxatilis
- Ursinia scariosa
- Ursinia sericea
- Ursinia serrata
- Ursinia speciosa
- Ursinia subflosculosa
- Ursinia tenuifolia
- Ursinia tenuiloba
- Ursinia trifida
