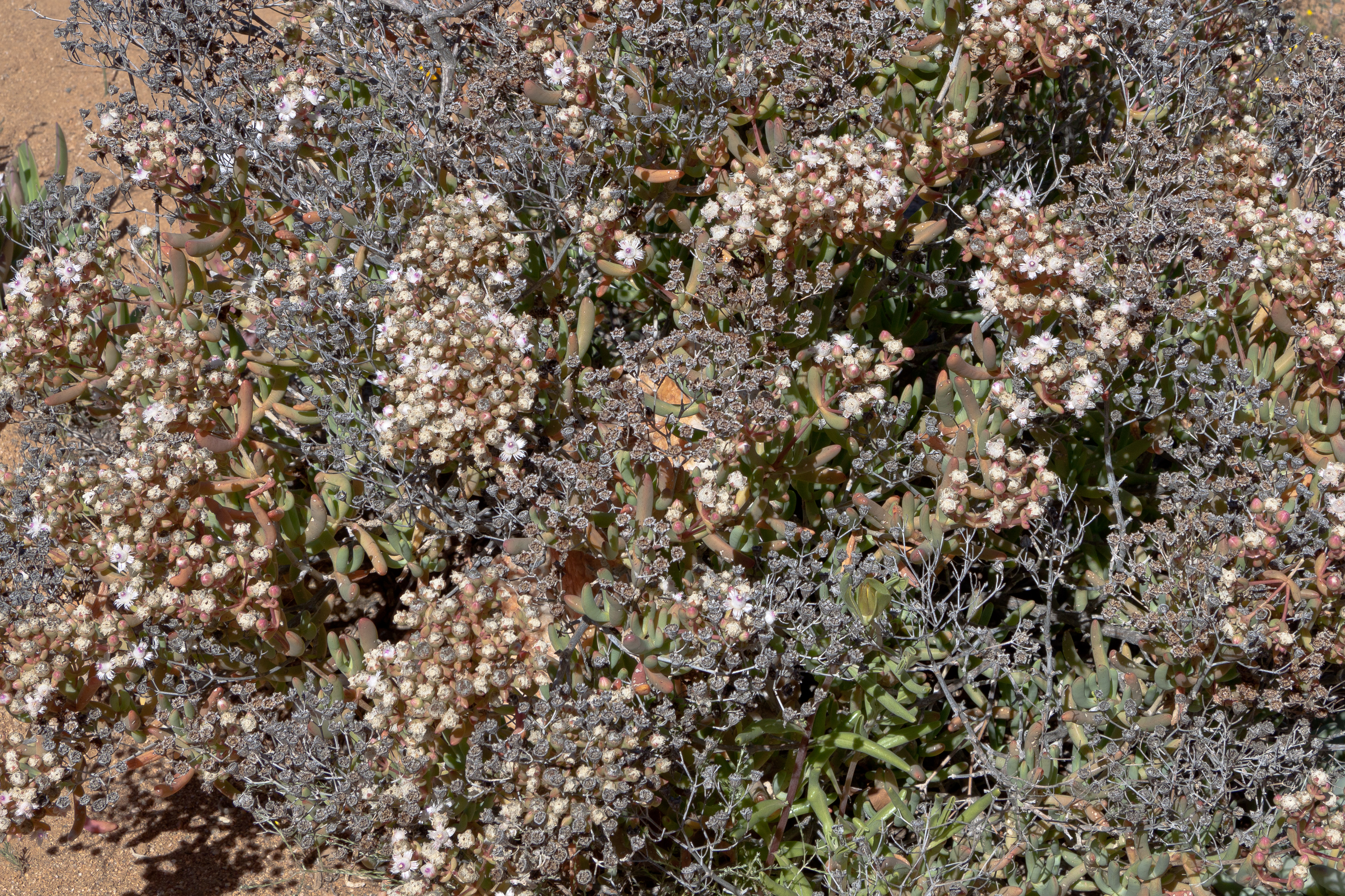

Scientific classification
- Kingdom: Plantae
- Clade: Tracheophytes
- Clade: Angiosperms
- Clade: Eudicots
- Order: Caryophyllales
- Family: Aizoaceae
- Genus: Stoeberia
- Species: S. frutescens

Binomial name
- Stoeberia frutescens (L.Bolus) van Jaarsv.

Synonyms
- Mesembryanthemum frutescens L.Bolus; Ruschia frutescens (L.Bolus) L.Bolus

= Stoeberia frutescens =

Species of succulent

Stoeberia frutescens is a shrub native to the Northern Cape, the Western Cape and Namibia. It primarily grows in drier environments.
