= Johannes Heinrich Ursinus =

Johannes Heinrich Ursinus (also known as Johannes Henricus Ursinus, Iohannes Henricus Ursinus, Johann Heinrich Ursin and even John Henry Ursinus) (26 January 1608 in Speyer – 14 May 1667 in Regensburg) was a learned German author, scholar, Lutheran theologian, humanist and dean of Regensburg.

Ursinus studied the Oriental roots of western philosophy and was the author of a scholastic encyclopaedia. He was a Rector in Mainz, preached in Weingarten, Speier and Regensburg, and had been a student in Straßburg.

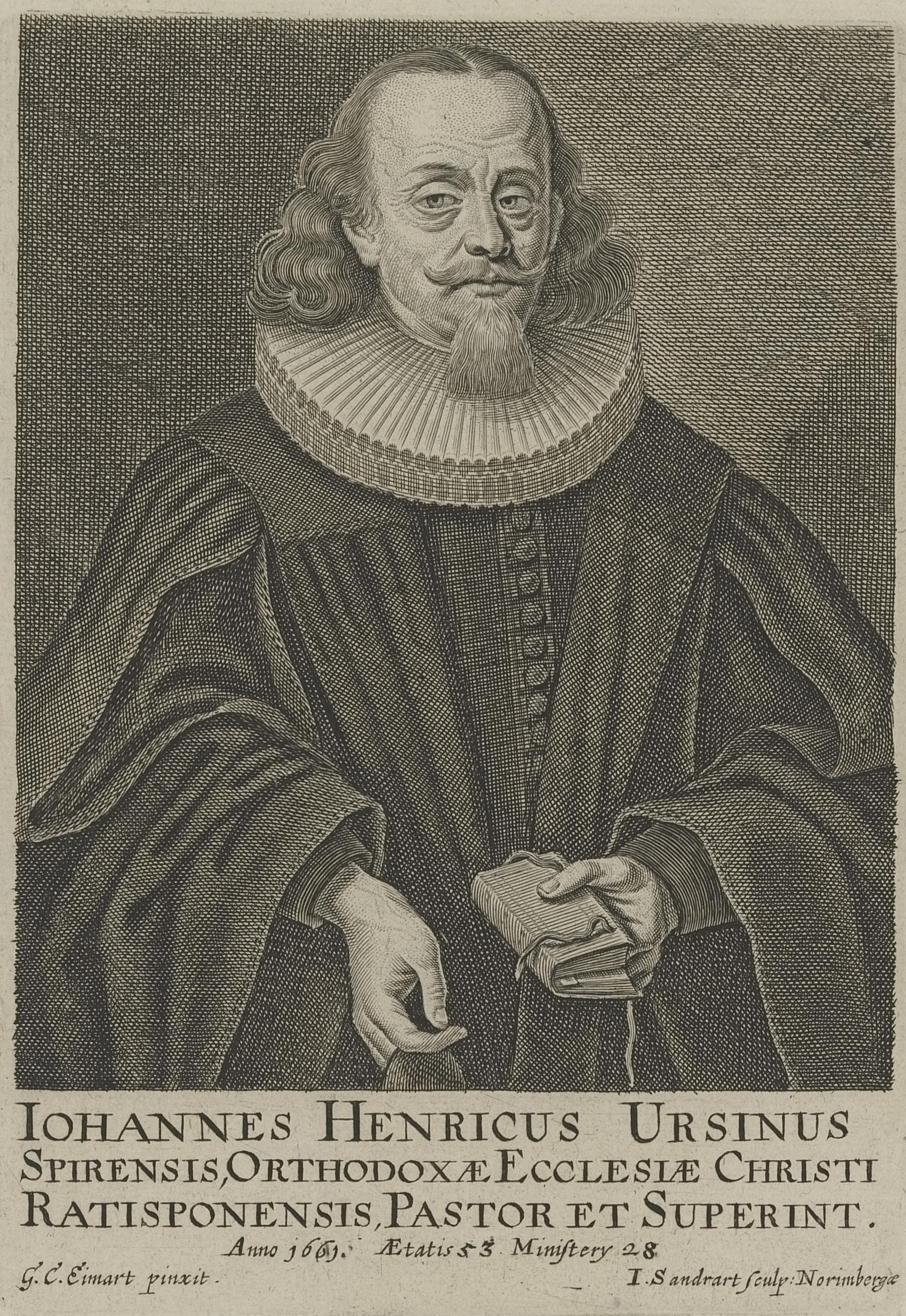
Johannes Heinrich Ursinus at age 53

His Arboretum Biblicum, which appeared in 1663, was the first attempt of note to create a concordance of botanical references in the Bible, and predated the Hierozoicon, a zoological compendium of biblical animals, of Samuel Bochart. In all Ursinus published 137 works in 153 publications in 3 languages.

The plant genus Ursinia was named after Ursinus by the German botanist, Joseph Gaertner.

== Selected works ==
- Musagetes, seu de studiis recte instituendis consilium, Regensburg 1656, Nürnberg 1659, Leipzig 1678
- Atrium Latinitatis sive Commentarius locuples in Januam Comenianam, Frankfurt 1657
- Progymnastices oratoriae epitome, praxin grammaticam, dialecticam, rhetoricam, Nürnberg 1659
- Analecta rhetorica sive progymnasmata sacrae profanaeque eloquentiae libri II, Nürnberg 1660
- De Zoroastre Bactriano, Hermete Trismegisto, Sanchoniathone Phoenicio eorumque scriptis et aliis contra Mosaicae scripturae antiquitatem exercitationes familiares, Nürnberg 1661
- Tyrocinium historico-chronologicum sive in Historiam Sacram et Profanam Universalem Brevis Manuductio in Usum Iuventutis, Frankfurt 1662 online
- Epitome metaphysicae, Nürnberg 1664
- Compendium Topicae generalis, Nürnberg 1664
- Compendium Logicae Aristotelicae, Regensburg 1664
- Encyclopaedia scholastica sive artium, quas vocant liberalium prima rudimenta, Nürnberg 1665
- De fortuna, Christophorus Ursinus ad panegyrin solemnem qua Johannes Brunnemannus viro Christiano Wildvogeln publ. collaturus, humanitate invitat, Frankfurt 1668

== Bibliography ==
- Johannes Henricus Ursinus, Autobiographischer Lebenslauf, Regensburg 1666; Neudr. von H. W. Wurster (Hg.), in: Zeitschrift für bayerische Kirchengeschichte 51, Nürnberg. 1982, S. 73 – 105.
