= Moraea bifida =

Scientific classification
- Kingdom: Plantae
- Clade: Tracheophytes
- Clade: Angiosperms
- Clade: Monocots
- Order: Asparagales
- Family: Iridaceae
- Genus: Moraea
- Species: M. bifida

Binomial name
- Moraea bifida (L.Bolus) Goldblatt

Synonyms
- Homeria bifida L.Bolus; Homeria salmonea L.Bolus

Species of flowering plant

Moraea bifida, commonly known as the pink cape tulip, is a plant and geophyte belonging to the genus Moraea and is part of the fynbos and Succulent Karoo. The species is endemic to the Northern Cape and Western Cape and occurs from eastern Namaqualand and western Karoo to the Pakhuis Pass. The population is stable.
