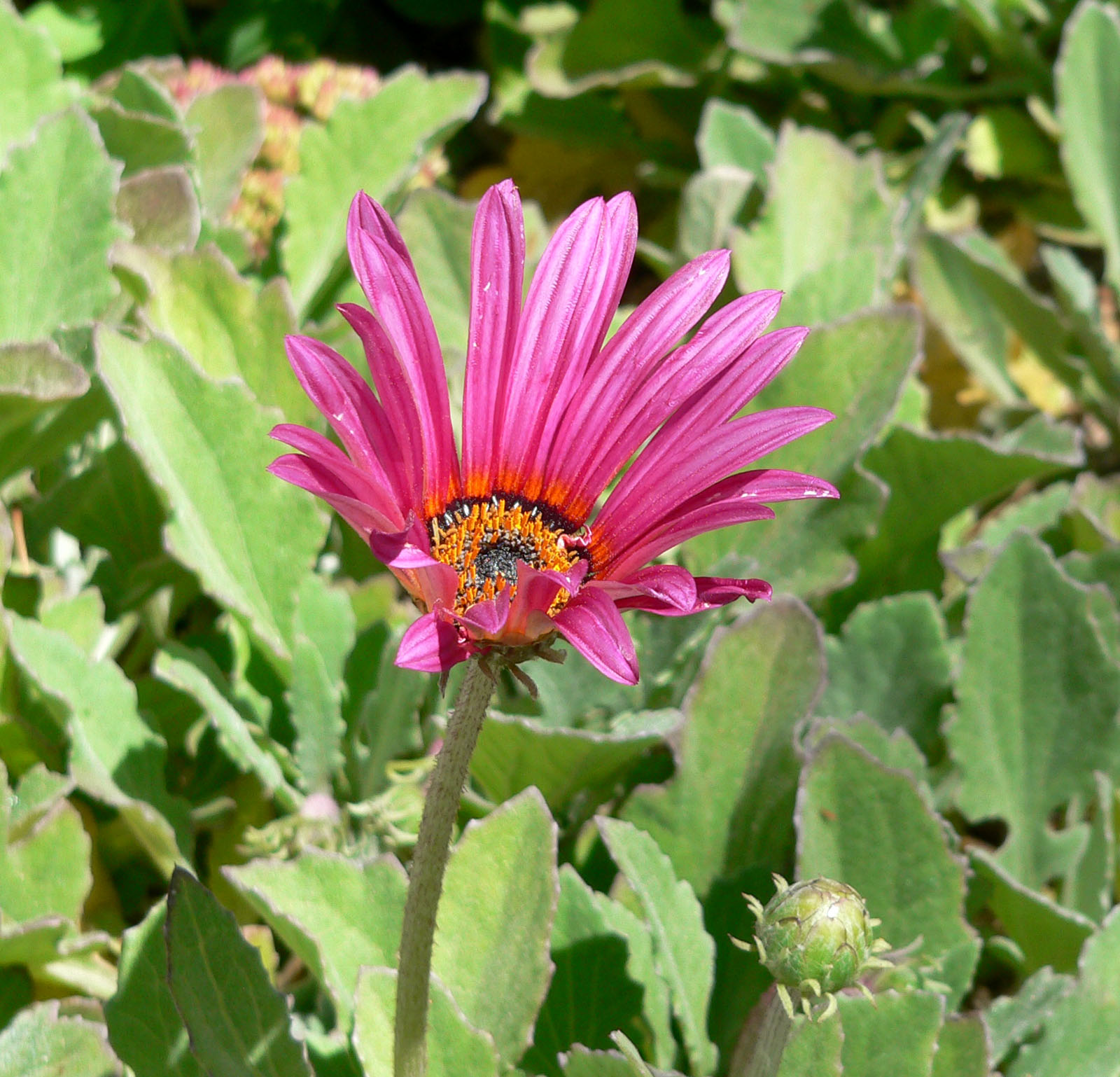

Scientific classification
- Kingdom: Plantae
- Clade: Tracheophytes
- Clade: Angiosperms
- Clade: Eudicots
- Clade: Asterids
- Order: Asterales
- Family: Asteraceae
- Genus: Arctotis
- Species: A. acaulis

Binomial name
- Arctotis acaulis L.

Synonyms
- Anemonospermos acaulis Kuntze; Arctotis humilis Salisb.; Arctotis scapigera Thunb.; Arctotis speciosa Jacq.; Venidium speciosum Regel

= Arctotis acaulis =

Species of plant

Arctotis acaulis is a species of flowering plant in the family Asteraceae and is an endemic species found in the Cape Provinces, South Africa.

== Etymology ==
The species name acaulis means without a stem, from Greek a which means without, and caulis meaning stem of a plant. The name refers to the species growth habit.
