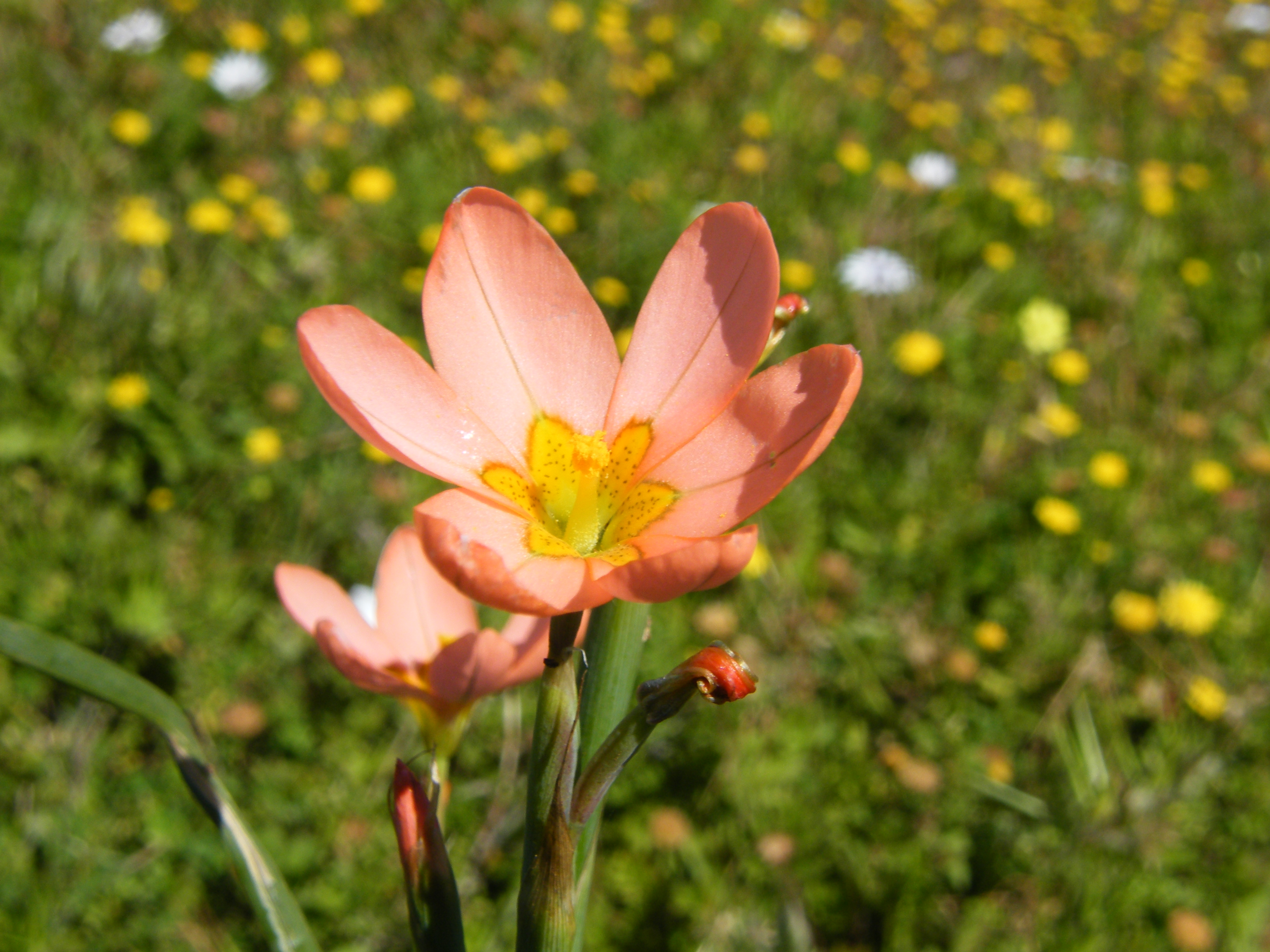

Scientific classification
- Kingdom: Plantae
- Clade: Tracheophytes
- Clade: Angiosperms
- Clade: Monocots
- Order: Asparagales
- Family: Iridaceae
- Genus: Moraea
- Species: M. miniata

Binomial name
- Moraea miniata Andrews

= Moraea miniata =

Species of flowering plant

Moraea miniata is a plant species in the family Iridaceae.
