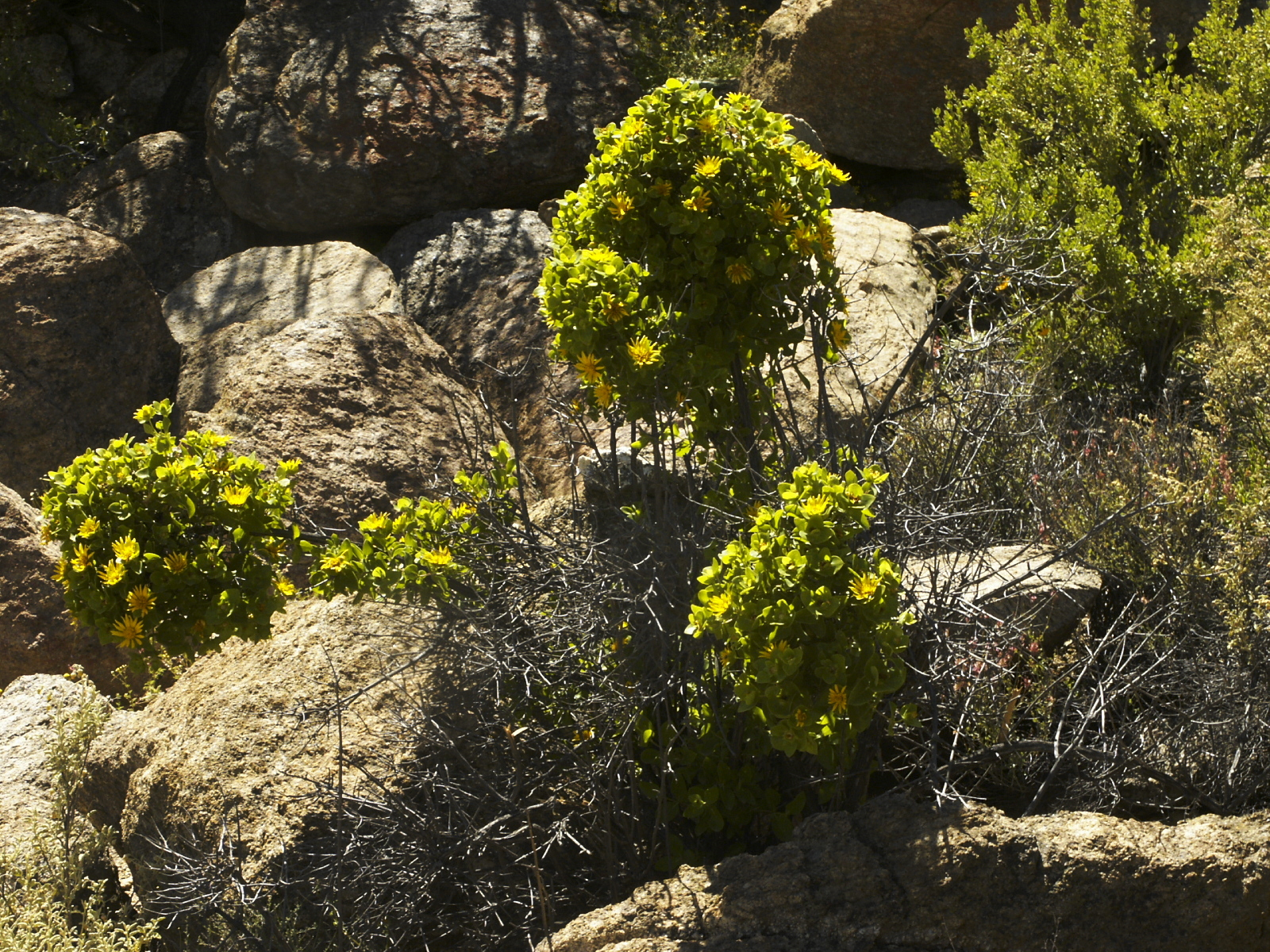
- Habit of plant in Goegap Nature Reserve
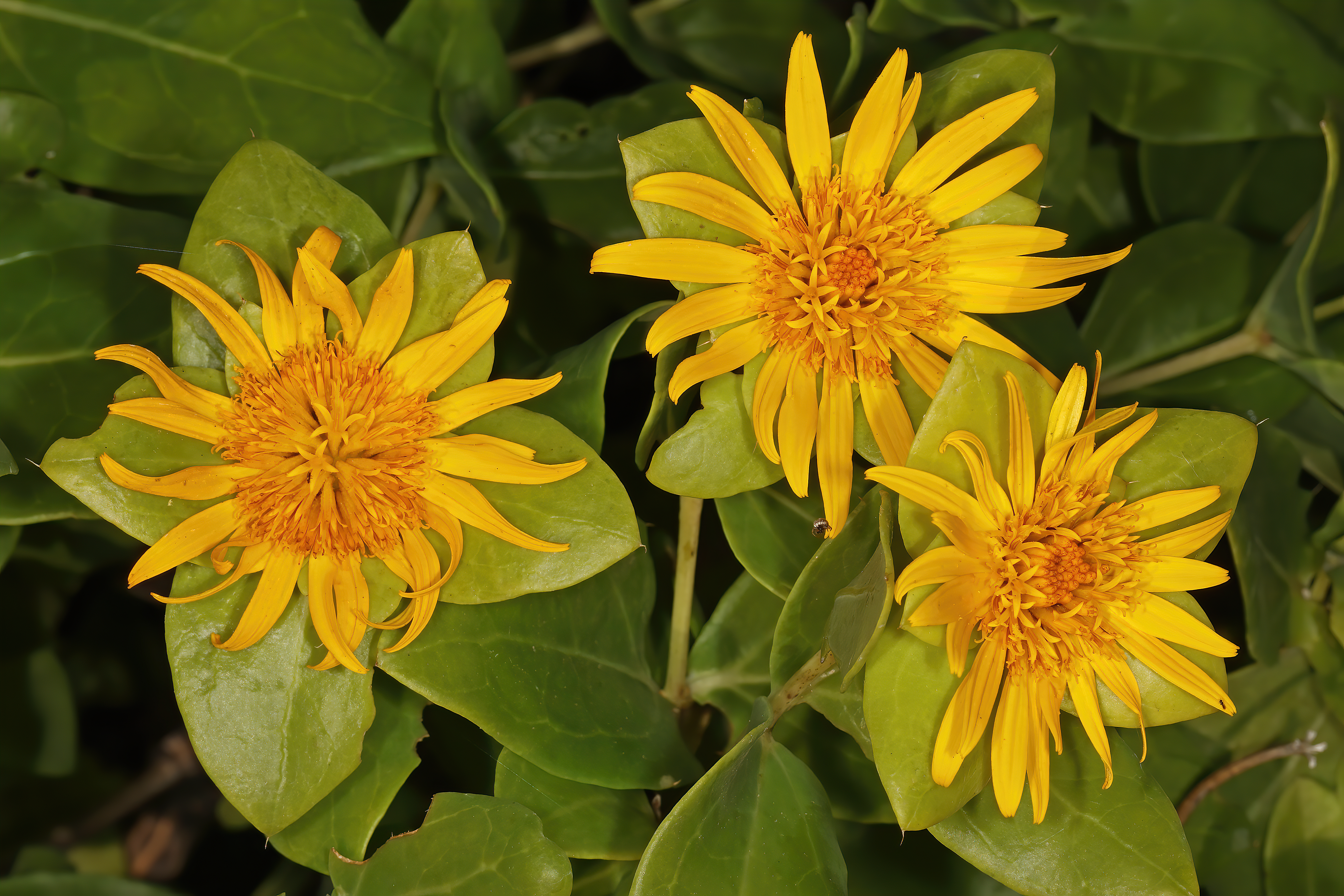
- Flowerheads, Nardouwsberg, Clanwilliam

Scientific classification
- Kingdom: Plantae
- Clade: Tracheophytes
- Clade: Angiosperms
- Clade: Eudicots
- Clade: Asterids
- Order: Asterales
- Family: Asteraceae
- Genus: Didelta
- Species: D. spinosa

Binomial name
- Didelta spinosa (L.f.) Aiton

Synonyms
- Favonium spinosum (L.f.) Gaertn.; Polymnia spinosa L.f.; Choristea spinosa Thunb.

= Didelta spinosa =

Species of flowering plant

Didelta spinosa, belonging to the family of Asteraceae, is a Southern African woody shrub or small tree endemic to the West Coast and found from Saldanha Bay in the south across the Gariep into the south-west corner of Namibia. Growing 2–3 m tall and drought-resistant, its preferred habitat is on dry, rocky slopes. This species was introduced to Europe by Thunberg and Masson.

Leaves are opposite, shiny, oval to elliptic with margins rolled under (revolute) with irregular spine-tipped teeth - young leaves and twigs somewhat felted; flowers with an outer row of unusually large and leaf-like bracts with mucronate apices, and which become membranous with age; fruits in spine-fringed cells. Flowering takes place from midwinter to early spring. There are only 2 species in this genus, the other being Didelta carnosa. Recent phylogeny studies have placed the genus Didelta and Berkheya spinosissima in the same clade.

The beetle Julodis viridipes has been recorded feeding on the foliage of D. spinosa, whereas the nematodes Scutellonema brachyurus, Paratrichodorus meyeri and Xiphinema loteni have a close association with the tree.

== History ==
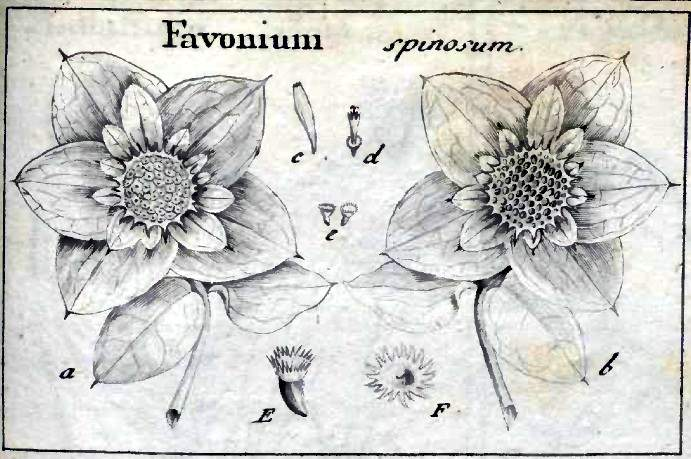

The two currently recognised species of Didelta were first described in 1781 by Carl Linnaeus the Younger and placed in the genus Polymnia, an American genus to which they were ill-suited. In 1785 a detailed colour plate by Buc'hoz was published in Grand Jardin de l'Univers of a plant that had been cultivated at Trianon and named Breteuillia trianensis by him - the plant clearly being Linnaeus' Polymnia carnosa. The genus Didelta was based on this same plant and published in L'Heritier's Stirpes novae in 1786 as Didelta tetragoniifolia. The genus Breteuillia thus predates Didelta but Burtt recommended that the name Didelta should be conserved because of its wide usage. Didelta tetragoniifolia was later shown to be Linnaeus the Younger's Polymnia carnosa, and this species, together with its sibling Polymnia spinosa, was transferred to Didelta. Joseph Gaertner in his monumental work "De frvctibvs et seminibvs plantarvm" of 1788-1792 published the species as Favonium spinosum (see illustration). Thunberg in his 1800 work Prodromus Plantarum Capensium v2 p163 placed both species in a new genus Choristea.
