= Froggatt =

Froggatt may refer to

== Places ==
- Froggatt, Derbyshire, a village in the Derbyshire Dales district, England
- Froggatt Crescent, in Croydon, New South Wales, Australia, named for Walter Wilson Froggatt

== People ==
- Chris Froggatt (born 1993), British racing driver
- Jack Froggatt (1922–1993), English football player
- Joanne Froggatt (born 1980), British actress
- Kathryn Froggatt, member of the band Wheatus
- Sir Leslie Froggatt (1920–2010), British-born Australian businessman
- Peter Froggatt (academic) (1928–2020), British doctor and academic
- Raymond Froggatt (born 1941), British singer
- Redfern Froggatt (1924–2003), English football player
- Steve Froggatt (born 1973), English football player
- Walter Wilson Froggatt (1858–1937), Australian geologist and economic entomologist

== Awards ==
- The Froggatt prize for Science at the Presbyterian Ladies' College, Sydney
- The Froggatt Awards, awarded by the Invasive Species Council of Australia.

== Species ==
Named in honour of Walter Wilson Froggatt:

- Acacia froggattii, an Australian tree species
- Adlerzia froggatti, an Australian ant species
- Anonychomyrma froggatti, a species of ant
- Aprostocetus froggatti, a species of hymenopteran
- Australaethina froggatti, the kurrajong pod beetle, an Australian beetle.
- Bactrocera froggatti, a species of fruit fly
- Camponotus froggatti, a species of carpenter ant
- Ceratognathus froggatti, a stag beetle
- Cicindela froggatti, a species of beetle
- Eucalyptus froggattii, an Australian tree species
- Froggatt's catfish (Cinetodus froggatti), a species of fish that is endemic to Australia
- Haplothrips froggatti, a species of thrips
- Leptomyrmex froggatti, a species of ant
- Myrmecia froggatti, a species of ant
- Phylacteophaga froggatti, a species of sawfly
- Pleistodontes froggatti, an Australian fig wasp
- Pseuduvaria froggattii, an Australian plant species
- Solenopsis froggatti, a species of fire ant
