= Treasureflower =

Treasureflower is a common name for several plants in the genus Gazania that are cultivated as ornamentals. Treasureflower may refer to:

- Gazania linearis
- Gazania rigens
