= Froggatt Awards =

Australian environmental award

Froggatt Award
- Description: Recognizing major contributions to protecting Australia from invasive species
- Country: Australia
- Presented by: Invasive Species Council

The Froggatt Award is presented to people who have made a major contribution to protecting Australia's native plants and animals, ecosystems, and people from dangerous new invasive species.

The Froggatt Awards are named in honour of Australian entomologist Walter Froggatt, who, when the cane toad was released into Australia in the 1930s to control beetle infestations in the sugar cane industry, was a lone voice, lobbying the federal government to exercise caution.

== History ==
The Froggatt Awards were first presented in 2003, by the Invasive Species Council.

From 2003 to 2006 there was only one award per year.

No awards were issued from 2007 to 2014.

From 2015 there have been multiple awards presented, one each for various categories of activity determined each year.

The original trophy was a stuffed cane toad, but is now a framed certificate.

=== Name ===
In 2006 the award was temporarily renamed from the Froggatt Award to the Biosecure Australia Award, (Note: Not to be confused with Australian Biosecurity Awards) and renamed back to the Froggatt Award in 2015 when the awards recommenced.

The Biosecure Australia Award was to be presented annually in recognition of an outstanding contribution to the eradication, early warning, preventative action, awareness raising or management of an invasive species in Australia.

=== Coverage ===
In 2017 the award received exceptionally extensive coverage within Australia, and also international coverage, when it was awarded to the Minister for Agriculture and Water Resources, Barnaby Joyce. This was in recognition of the minister's actions when pet dogs Pistol and Boo were brought to Australia by Johnny Depp and his partner Amber Heard in contravention of the Biosecurity Act 2015.

== Recipients ==
=== 2017 Froggatt Award ===
Category	Presented to	Citation	Ref
Communication	Gregory Andrews	Australia's first Threatened Species Commissioner, for his enthusiastic and fearless efforts in raising awareness about the impact of feral cats and other invasive species.	
Control and eradication	Sea Spurge Remote Area Teams	For 10 years work eradicating sea spurge from Tasmania’s rugged southwest coastline. During this period more than 150 remote area volunteers have removed 14.2 million sea purge plants from 600km of coastline using 6000 hours of labour valued at over $1.4 million.	
Research	Ecology Australia	For their generous pro bono support surveying Australia’s only smooth newt infestation.	

=== 2015 Froggatt Award ===
Category	Presented to	Citation	Ref
Principled decision-making	Barnaby Joyce	For the decision to introduce mandatory biofouling rules to prevent marine pests entering Australia, and for acting quickly and decisively in expelling Johnny Depp and Amber Heard's dogs which had been brought into Australia in an apparent breach of Australia's strict quarantine laws.	
Communication	Lucy Karger, Lori Lach, Daniel Bateman, Frank Teodo	For exceptional efforts to eradicate yellow crazy ants from the Wet Tropics World Heritage Area. Without these tireless efforts few people would appreciate the danger posed by the highly invasive and environmentally destructive yellow crazy ant.	
Control	NSW red imported fire ant response	For rapid and effective effort in eliminating red imported fire ants from Port Botany in Sydney.	
Policy and law	Senate Environment and Communications References Committee	For their work on the inquiry into environmental biosecurity and the final report, an insightful coverage of a complex issue with cross-party recommendations aimed at improving Australia's preparedness against invasive species impacting the environment.	

=== 2003–2006 ===
==== Froggatt Award ====
Year	Presented to	Citation	Ref
2003	Barbara Waterhouse, Team Botanist with the Northern Australia Quarantine Strategy	For work in directly stopping some of the world's worst weeds from establishing in Australia	
2004	The community of Inverloch, in south eastern Victoria, including the many non-residents who lent their support	For their inspired efforts to eradicate a Northern Pacific Seastar outbreak that had spread from Port Phillip Bay	
2005	Samantha Setterfield, Michael Douglas	For cutting-edge work with three grass species, including Gamba (Andropogon gayanus). For their research on the severe impacts of tropical grassy weeds in northern Australia, and advocacy for a strong response from government.	

==== Biosecure Australia Award ====
Year	Presented to	Citation	Ref
2006	Andrew Hingston, the school of Geography and Environmental Studies at the University of Tasmania in Hobart.	For his research on the invasion of the European Bumblebee (Bombus terrestris), its impacts, and also for his advocacy for a strong response from government.	

== See also ==
- List of environmental awards
