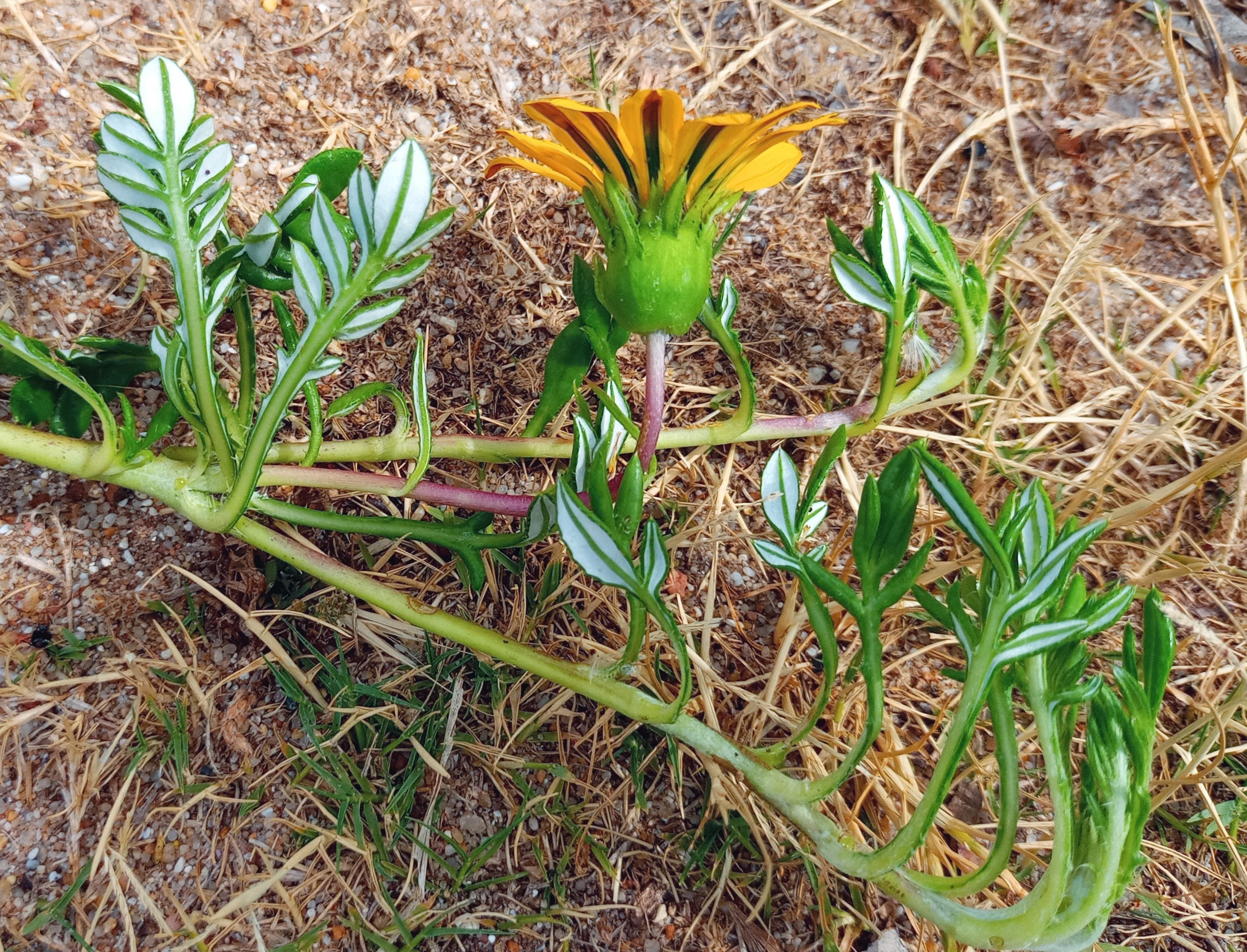
- The distinctive elongated stems, pinnate spiny-margined leaves and involucre of Gazania maritima.

Scientific classification
- Kingdom: Plantae
- Clade: Tracheophytes
- Clade: Angiosperms
- Clade: Eudicots
- Clade: Asterids
- Order: Asterales
- Family: Asteraceae
- Genus: Gazania
- Species: G. maritima

Binomial name
- Gazania maritima Levyns

= Gazania maritima =

Species of plant

Gazania maritima is a species of flowering plant in the family Asteraceae, native to the Western Cape province, South Africa.

== Description ==
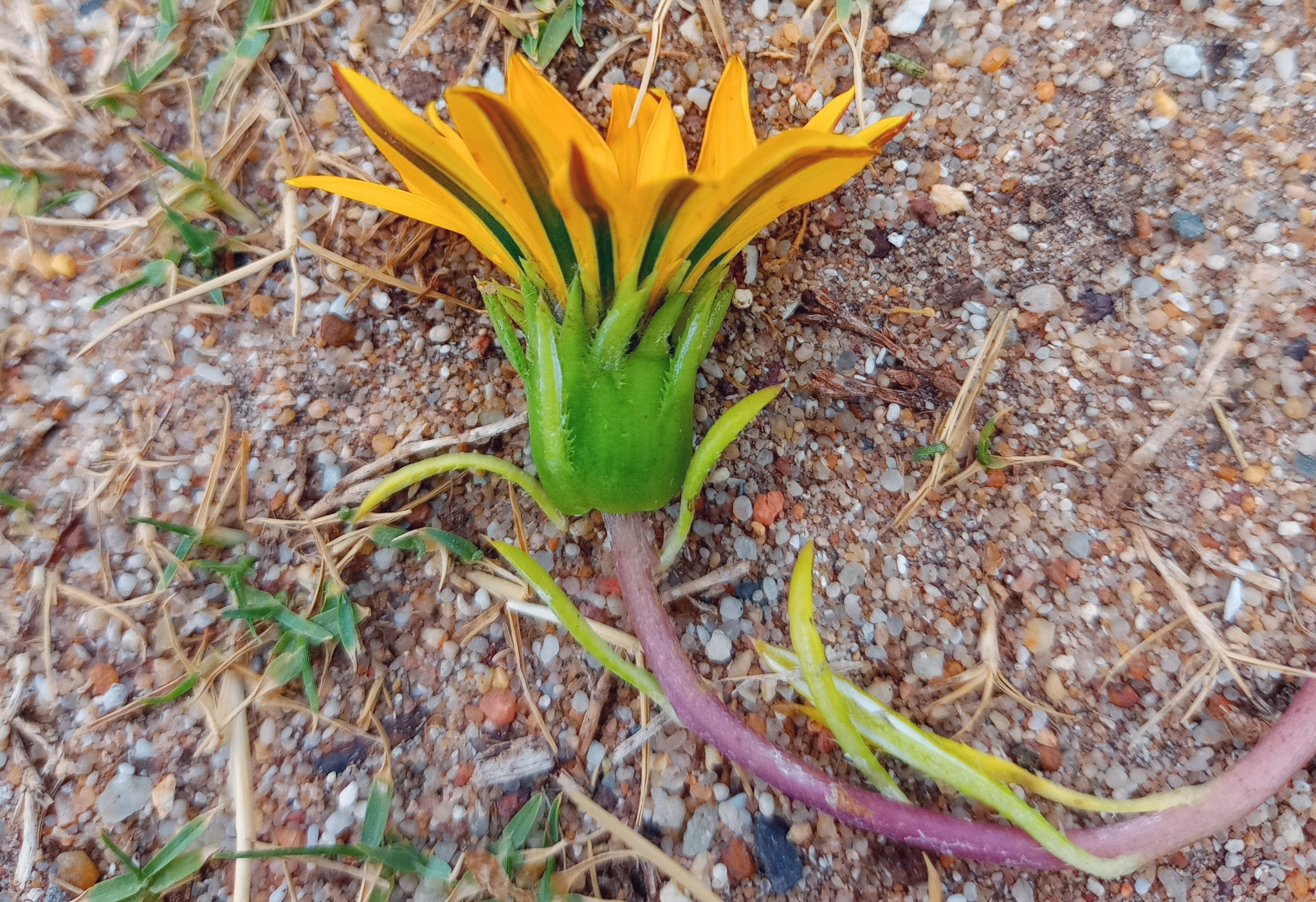
The involucre of Gazania maritima

Gazania maritima is a perennial species, with a spreading growth-form (similar to Gazania rigens) and stems that spread and form mats.

The leaves are usually pinnate, but can also sometimes be whole. The upper leaf surface is smooth (glabrous). The leaf margins are lined with tiny spines.

The flowerheads have yellow rays (sometimes orange). Like most gazanias, the ray undersides usually have dark stripes. The petioles are sometimes ciliate. The involucre is smooth (glabrous) and campanulate, with an obtuse base (sometimes subintruse). The outer involucre bracts have ciliate margins with spinules; The inner involucre bracts have entire, membranous margins.

== Distribution ==
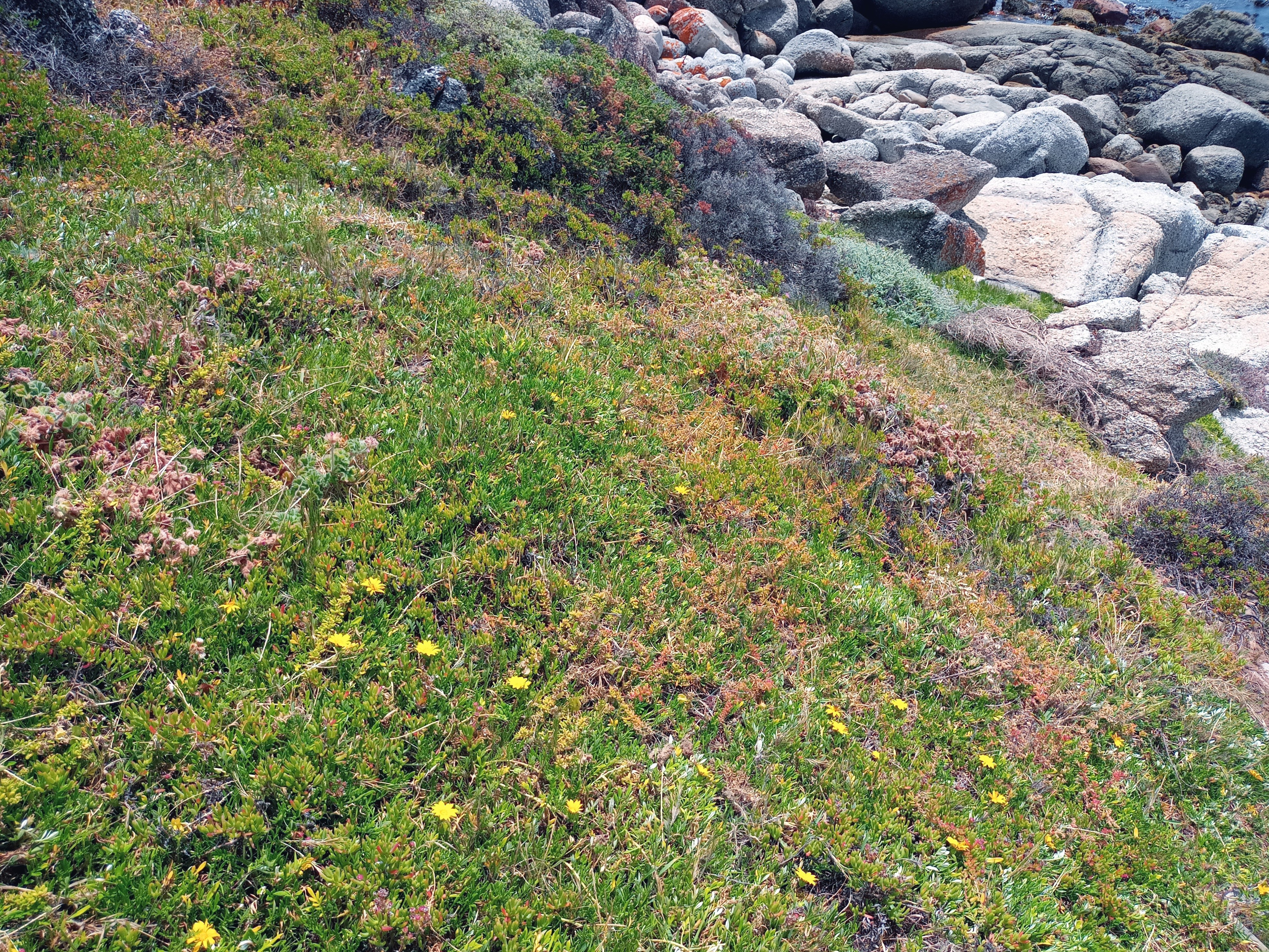
Gazania maritima in its natural coastal habitat near Cape Point.

Gazania maritima is indigenous to the Western Cape Province, South Africa. It is recorded from Cape Point (the type locality) on the Cape Peninsula, and from Cape Hangklip.
