= Pygmaeascincus timlowi =

Conservation status
- Least Concern (IUCN 3.1)

Scientific classification
- Kingdom: Animalia
- Phylum: Chordata
- Class: Reptilia
- Order: Squamata
- Family: Scincidae
- Genus: Pygmaeascincus
- Species: P. timlowi

Binomial name
- Pygmaeascincus timlowi (Ingram, 1977)

Synonyms
- Menetia timlowi Ingram, 1977; Lygisaurus timlowi (Ingram, 1977)

Species of lizard

Pygmaeascincus timlowi, also known commonly as the dwarf litter-skink, Low's four-fingered skink, and Low's pygmy skink, is a species of lizard in the subfamily Eugongylinae of the family Scincidae. The species is endemic to Queensland in Australia.

== Description ==
Pygmaeascincus timlowi is dark brown to gray dorsally, with darker-colored flanks. The scales on the upper eyelid are large, and there is only one pretemporal scale. Adults have an average snout-to-vent length (SVL) of 29 mm (1.1 in).

== Etymology ==
The specific name, timlowi, is in honor of Australian biologist Tim Low.

== Habitat ==
The preferred natural habitats of Pygmaeascincus timlowi are forest and shrubland.

== Reproduction ==
Pygmaeascincus timlowi is oviparous. Clutch size is one or two eggs.
