= Sea Spurge Remote Area Teams =

Environment care group using a volunteer adventure conservation model

Sea Spurge Remote Area Teams (SPRATS) is an environment care group founded in 2007, using a volunteer adventure conservation model. The initial primary purpose of the group, made up of a number of teams, is to remove the invasive sea spurge flowering plant.

The group was founded by Dr Jon Marsden-Smedley, a research fellow at the University of Tasmania's School of Geography and Environmental Studies.

As of 2017, SPRATS have removed over 14 million plants. It is regarded as the "way of the future for community conservation" by the Tasmanian Parks and Wildlife Service.

== Motivation ==
Sea spurge has a toxic sap, and critically the plant changes the shape and ecology of the coastal dunes, pushing out shore nesting birds, and also negatively impacting Aboriginal heritage sites. The Tasmanian target area is a key area for the hooded plover, pied oystercatcher, and sooty oystercatcher. It is also a key feeding zone for the migrating orange-bellied parrot. The little tern is also adversely affected.

== Objectives ==
SPRATS aimed to establish and maintain an eradication zone for sea spurge (Euphorbia paralias) and marram grass (Ammophila arenaria) along 600 kilometres (370 mi) of southwest and southern Tasmanian coastline from Macquarie Harbour to Cockle Creek. The initial programme had a 10 year duration.

== Achievements and awards ==
In 2009 SPRATS received the Tasmanian Award for Environmental Excellence in the Community section.

In the first 3 years to 2010, 80 volunteers had contributed 2000 person days, removing 3 million sea spurge plants.

As of June 2010, SPRATS expect to have cleared sea spurge from 90% of the shore between Strahan and Cockle Creek, 25% of Tasmania's coast. Another SPRATS group is operating on the east coast of Tasmania. The SPRATS approach is also used in northern Tasmania on King Island. SPRATS have also worked on Tasmanian islands.

By 2015 the partnership between SPRATS and the Tasmanian Parks & Wildlife Service had resulted in nearly 14 million plants have been removed, mainly by hand.

In 2017, after 11 years, SPRATS have removed over 14 million plants. For their work the group has been awarded a Froggatt Award by the Invasive Species Council.

As of January 2017, empowering bushwalking volunteers adventurers who also want to contribute to the environment, has turned $223,000 worth of state and federal government grants into $1.4 million worth of volunteer labour. SPRATS has also eradicated the few blackberry infestations found along the coastline, monitored for other weeds, recorded information on rare and threatened shorebird species, for example, little tern, fairy tern, hooded plover, red-capped plover, pied oystercatcher, and orange-bellied parrot, and Aboriginal cultural sites, for example, petroglyphs, stone arrangements, middens, and hut sites, and the usage of the area by other users. The estimated reduction in marram grass clumps is over 95%.

The SPRATS model of:

- careful planning
- community engagement
- agency partnership

has demonstrated and proven a highly successfully means of weed eradication in areas of difficult access. It is regarded as the "way of the future for community conservation" by the Tasmanian Parks and Wildlife Service.

The SPRATS have been so successful that the concept is being generalised into adventure volunteering. Activity has also been organised to remove other infestations, for example blackberry infestations.

More broadly, adventure volunteering, or adventure conservation, is a very successful form of citizen science.

== Formation and structure ==
SPRATS was formed as an outcome of a survey in 2006 and of a pilot programme undertaken in 2007 to support the Tasmanian Beach Weeds Strategy 2003.

SPRATS are a group consisting of volunteers, and is part of the Tasmanian environmental organisation, Wildcare.

Risk to volunteers is managed by their careful selection, operations safety assessments, and communications support. Predeployment briefings and postdeployment debriefings are held.

Logistics costs are covered by Australian Government grants and by Tasmanian Parks and Wildlife Service operating funding.

Other groups and organisations actively support and contribute personnel to SPRATS.

Volunteers typically pay their own way to predeployment staging areas, and utilise their own personal time to contribute.

Site access by teams is on foot. Remote area volunteers are deployed by helicopter, boat, or fixed-wing aircraft. Trips vary from eight days to three weeks. On the longer hauls food drops are used so that the volunteers only have to carry one week’s worth of supplies, they also have to bring their own hiking and camping gear. A day typically includes four to six hours of weeding, with the rest of the time left for birdwatching, snorkelling, exploring or just relaxing.

== Science and methodology ==
A feature of the SPRATS work is the supporting science and formal processes. The volunteers:

- collect information on site location, the weeds removed, time taken to weed sites
- research the most effective treatment method, for example, based on plant maturity and seeding times

Detailed maps of work sites and routes are prepared prior to deployment and GPS programmed. Optimisation of base camping and excursions has occurred for both new areas and for follow up treatment.
