= Barry Traill =

Australian zoologist

Dr Barry Traill AM is an Australian zoologist, conservationist and environmental campaigner. He grew up in Victoria and holds a bachelor's degree and PhD in terrestrial ecology from Monash University, Melbourne, Australia. Traill is the former Director of The Pew Charitable Trusts' Australian Outback to Oceans program - joining the organisation in 2007 and leaving in 2020. Traill has particular interest and expertise in the ecology of terrestrial birds and mammals and landscape-scale conservation of temperate and tropical woodlands and forests. Prior to joining Pew, he worked for 25 years as a conservation advocate and scientist for Australian state and national organisations.

Traill's work has led to the protection of the Box-Ironbark woodlands of Victoria, the cessation of the broadscale clearing of the Queensland bush, and the creation of the world's largest network of marine parks. He was a founder of the Northern Australia Environment Alliance and, with conservationist Tim Low, he founded the Invasive Species Council in 2002. With co-authors John Woinarski and Carol Booth he wrote a study on the future of Australia's Outback.

Traill was a founding member and first board president of the Invasive Species Council (ISC). The ISC are a policy, advocacy, lobbying, research, and outreach group on matters related to invasive species.

In the 2023 King's Birthday Honours, Traill was appointed a Member in the General Division of Order of Australia (AM) for "significant service to conservation and the environment in a range of roles".

== Bibliography ==
- The Modern Outback: Nature, people and the future of remote Australia
- The Nature of Northern Australia - a study of the values and prospects for the environment of Northern Australia
- Into Oblivion - The disappearing mammals of Northern Australia
- Conservation of Australia's Outback Wilderness
- "Populate Wilderness or Perish" - TEDx Sydney, 2014
