= Pygmaeascincus sadlieri =

Conservation status
- Least Concern (IUCN 3.1)

Scientific classification
- Kingdom: Animalia
- Phylum: Chordata
- Class: Reptilia
- Order: Squamata
- Suborder: Scinciformata
- Infraorder: Scincomorpha
- Family: Scincidae
- Genus: Pygmaeascincus
- Species: P. sadlieri

Binomial name
- Pygmaeascincus sadlieri (Greer, 1991)

Synonyms
- Menetia sadlieri

Species of lizard

Pygmaeascincus sadlieri, the Magnetic Island dwarf skink, is a species of skink found in Queensland in Australia.
