= Pygmaeascincus =

Scientific classification
- Kingdom: Animalia
- Phylum: Chordata
- Class: Reptilia
- Order: Squamata
- Family: Scincidae
- Subfamily: Eugongylinae
- Genus: Pygmaeascincus; Couper & Hoskin, 2014

Species
- Three species, see text.

Genus of lizards

Pygmaeascincus is a genus of lizards in the subfamily Eugongylinae of the family Scincidae (skinks). All member species are endemic to Australia.

== Species ==
The following three species, listed alphabetically by specific name, are recognized as being valid:

- Pygmaeascincus koshlandae (Greer, 1991) – fine-browed dwarf skink
- Pygmaeascincus sadlieri (Greer, 1991) – Magnetic Island dwarf skink
- Pygmaeascincus timlowi (Ingram, 1977) – dwarf litter-skink

Nota bene: A binomial authority in parentheses indicates that the species was originally described in a genus other than Pygmaeascincus.

== Etymology ==
The specific name, sadlieri, is in honor of Australian herpetologist Ross Allen Sadlier.

The specific name, timlowi, is in honor of Australian biologist Tim Low.
