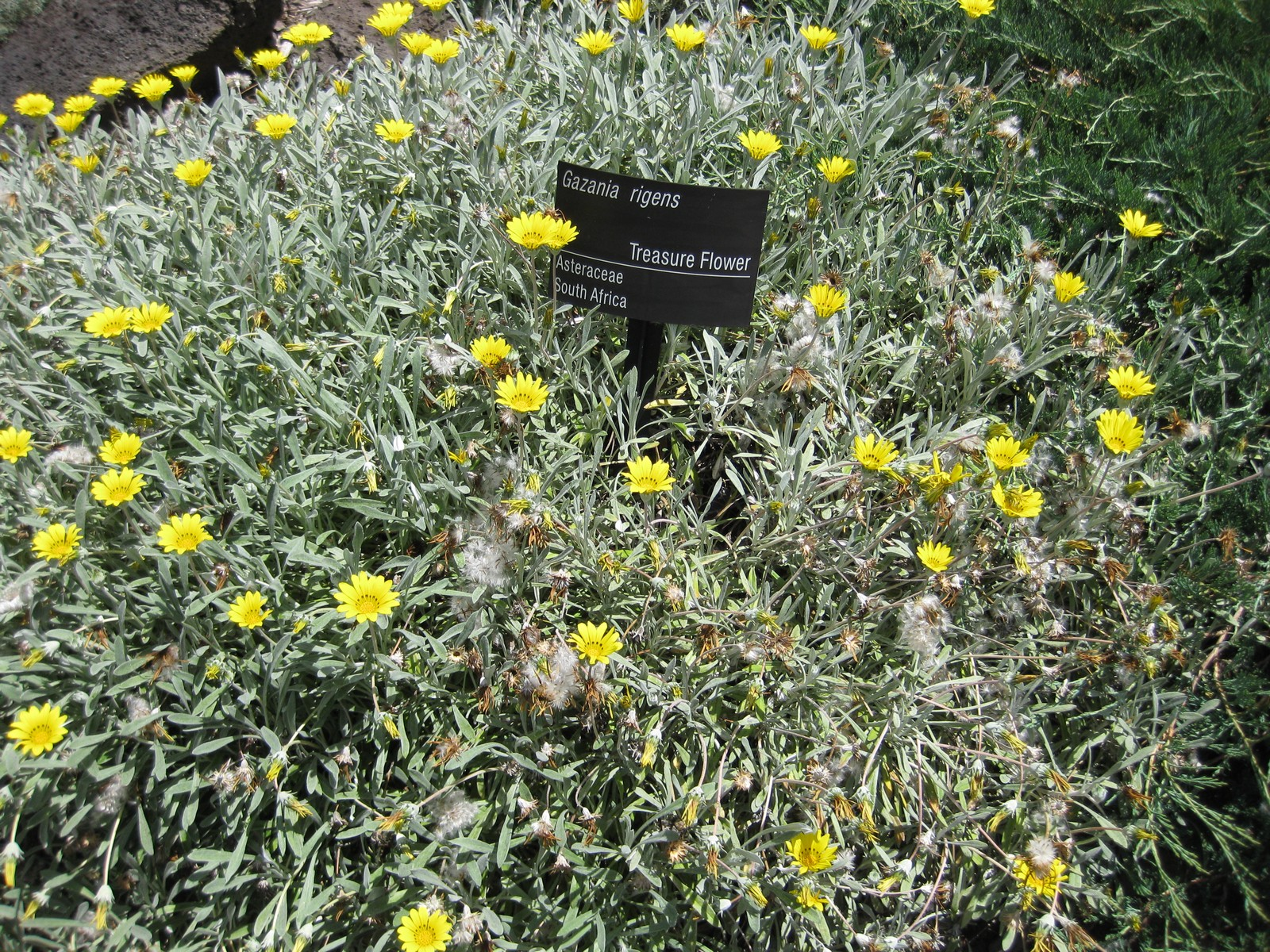
- Gazania rigens growth habit

Scientific classification
- Kingdom: Plantae
- Clade: Tracheophytes
- Clade: Angiosperms
- Clade: Eudicots
- Clade: Asterids
- Order: Asterales
- Family: Asteraceae
- Subfamily: Vernonioideae
- Tribe: Arctotideae
- Subtribe: Gorteriinae
- Genus: Gazania; Gaertn.

Type species
- Gazania rigens (L.) Gaertn.

Synonyms
- Melanchrysum Cass.

= Gazania =

Genus of flowering plants

Gazania /ɡəˈzeɪniə/ is a genus of flowering plants in the family Asteraceae, native to Southern Africa. They produce large, daisy-like composite flowerheads in brilliant shades of yellow and orange, over a long period in summer. They are often planted as drought-tolerant groundcover, but regarded as an environmental weed in parts of Australia, the Mediterranean, New Zealand, and California, where they have become naturalised.

== Taxonomic history ==
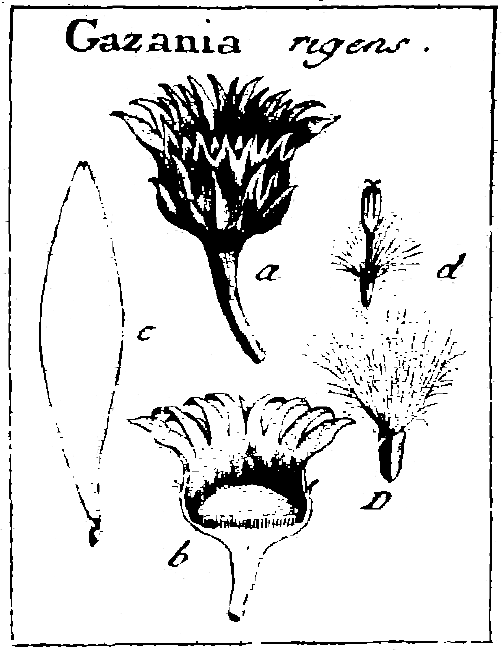
Illustrations of Gazania rigens from De Fructibus et Seminibus Plantarum, 1791

The genus was first formally described by German botanist Joseph Gaertner in the second volume of his major work De Fructibus et Seminibus Plantarum in 1791. Gaertner named the genus after Theodorus Gaza, a 15th-century translator of the works of Theophrastus.

Gazania is a genus of flowering plants in the family Asteraceae. It is a member of the tribe Arctotideae and the subtribe Gorteriinae. Within the subtribe it is close to Hirpicium and Gorteria.

Many of the species of Gazania are hard to distinguish and the number of species assigned to the genus has varied widely from one author to another. In 1959, Helmut Roessler published what he considered to be a preliminary revision of Gazania. At that time, he recognised 16 species. Roessler published some amendments to his treatment in 1973.

In 2009, a phylogeny of the genus was published. It was based on molecular phylogenetic analysis of chloroplast and nuclear DNA sequences. In this study, all of Roessler's species except Gazania othonnites were sampled. The authors found that eight species were not really separate, but formed a species complex. The seven species found to be distinct were G. jurineifolia, G. caespitosa, G. ciliaris, G. tenuifolia, G. heterochaeta, G. schenckii, and G. lichtensteinii.

== Description ==
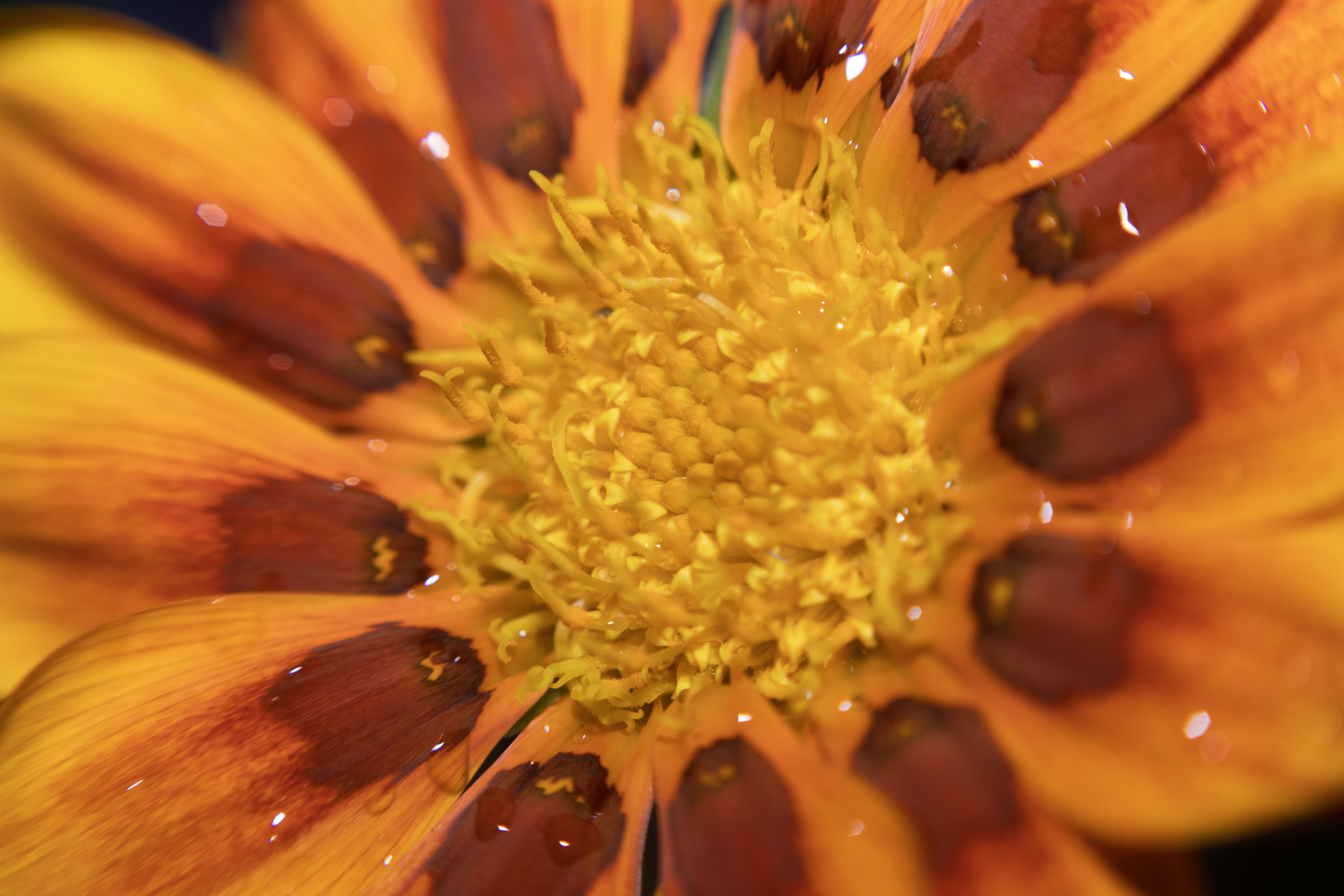
Close-up macro shot of flower of gazania rigens

Gazania species produce large, daisy-like composite flowerheads in brilliant shades of yellow and orange, over a long period in summer.

== Distribution ==
The gazania is native to Southern Africa. The genus occurs from low-altitude sands to alpine meadows in South Africa, Mozambique, Tanzania, and Angola.

Several species have been introduced and declared to be environmental weeds in parts of Australia, New Zealand, the Mediterranean, and California.

=== Australia ===
Gazania were first imported to Australia as garden plants in the 1950s and 1970s, touted for their low-maintenance cultivation and drought tolerance. However, they have since become an invasive species, due to their tolerance of harsh growing conditions, after escaping gardens. They have naturalised along roadsides and coastlines, invaded native grasslands and also started taking over vast tracts of agricultural land in South Australia, Victoria and parts of Western Australia. The plant's seed dispersal via wind has spread the plants into remote places, including the tops of sandhills and among native vegetation. It has spread in the Mallee and Wimmera regions. All subspecies are listed as environmental weeds in the state of Victoria, while the most common subspecies, Gazania rigens, is listed in Queensland, Tasmania, and New South Wales. South Australia has banned their sale in nurseries; however, nurseries in other states still sell them, including online. The Invasive Species Council has urged the federal government to introduce national regulation to prevent invasive garden plants being sold by nurseries. Bunnings and other sellers of invasive plants have been lobbied by environmentalists about their sale of gazanias and other invasive species, such as English ivy.

== Cultivation ==
Gazania species are grown for the brilliant colour of their flowerheads which appear in the late spring and are often in bloom throughout the summer into autumn. They prefer a sunny position and are tolerant of dryness and poor soils.

Numerous cultivars have been selected for variety of colour and habit. In temperate regions, they are usually grown as half-hardy annuals. A commonly grown variety is the trailing gazania (Gazania rigens var. leucolaena). It is commonly used as groundcover and can be planted en masse to cover large areas or embankments, assisted by its fast growth rate. Cultivars of this variety include 'Sunburst', 'Sunglow', and 'Sunrise Yellow'. Another popular cultivated variety is the clumping gazania (Gazania rigens), which has a number of named cultivars including 'Aztec', 'Burgundy', 'Copper King', 'Fiesta Red', 'Goldrush' and 'Moonglow'. The following cultivars have gained the Royal Horticultural Society's Award of Garden Merit:

- G. 'Aztec'
- G. 'Cookei'
- G. rigens 'Variegata'
- Talent Series

== Species ==
Sources:

- Gazania caespitosa Bolus
- Gazania ciliaris DC.
- Gazania heterochaeta DC.
- Gazania jurineifolia DC.
- Gazania krebsiana Less. - Terracotta Gazania
- Gazania lichtensteinii Less..
- Gazania leiopoda (DC.) Roessler
- Gazania linearis (Thunb.) Druce - Treasureflower
- Gazania maritima Levyns
- Gazania othonnites (Thunb.) Less.
- Gazania pectinata (Thunb.) Hartw.
- Gazania pinnata DC.
- Gazania rigens (L.) Gaertn.
- Gazania rigida (Burm.f.) Roessler
- Gazania schenckii O.Hoffm.
- Gazania serrata DC.
- Gazania tenuifolia Less.
- Gazania thermalis Dinter

== Gallery ==
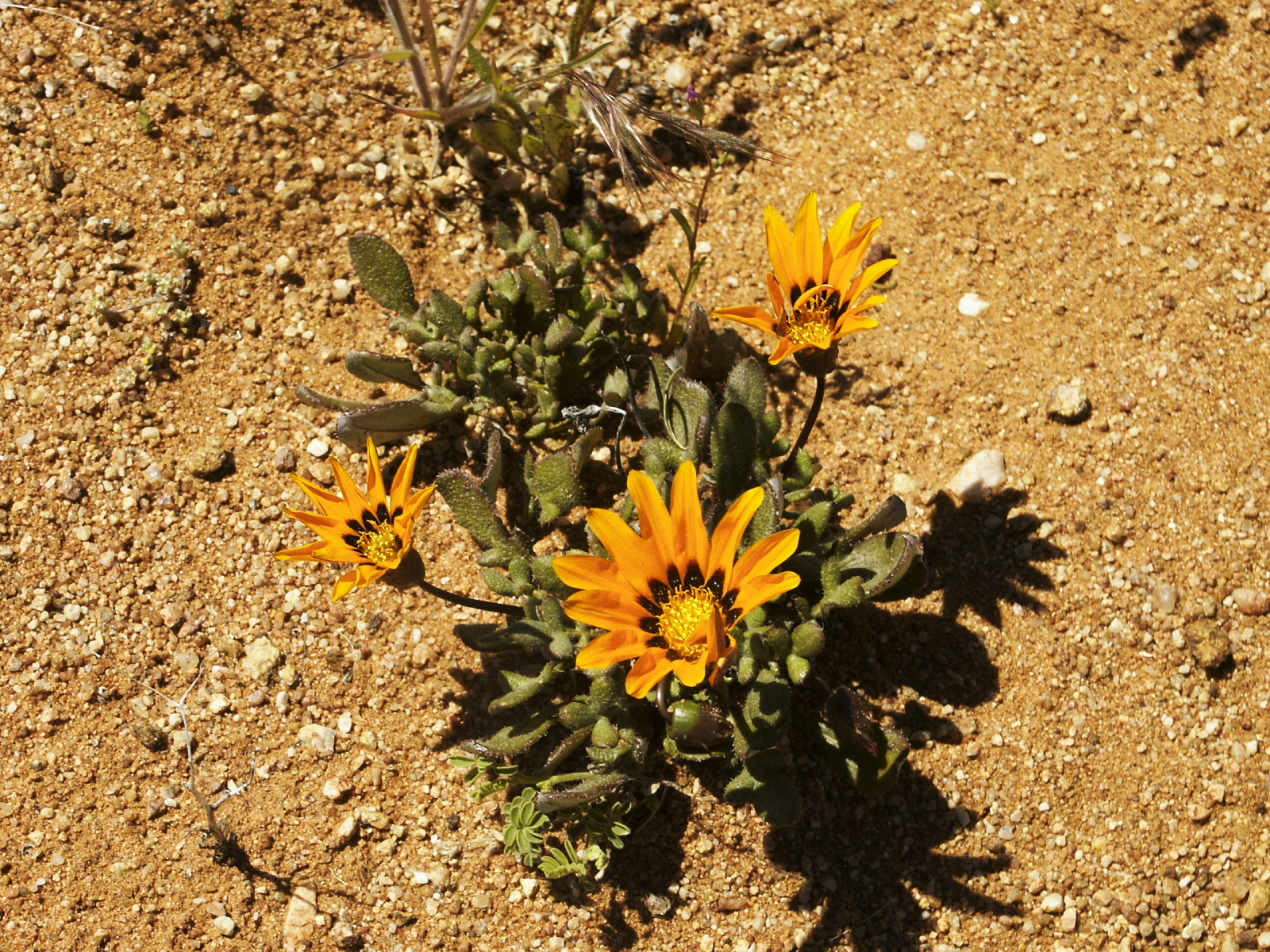
Gazania heterochaeta Goegap N.R., Namaqualand, Northern Cape, South Africa

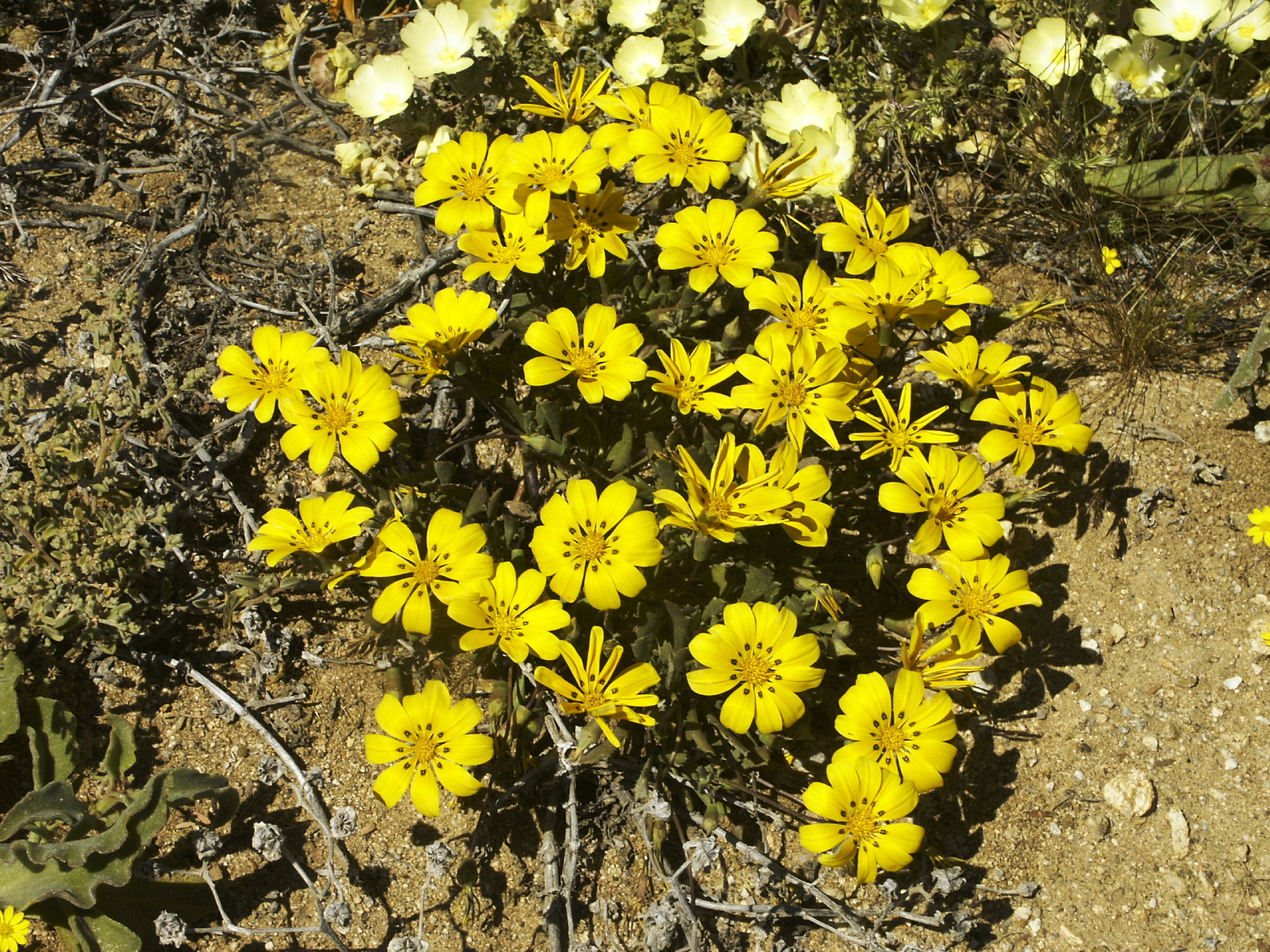
Gazania lichtensteinii Goegap N.R., Namaqualand, Northern Cape, South Africa

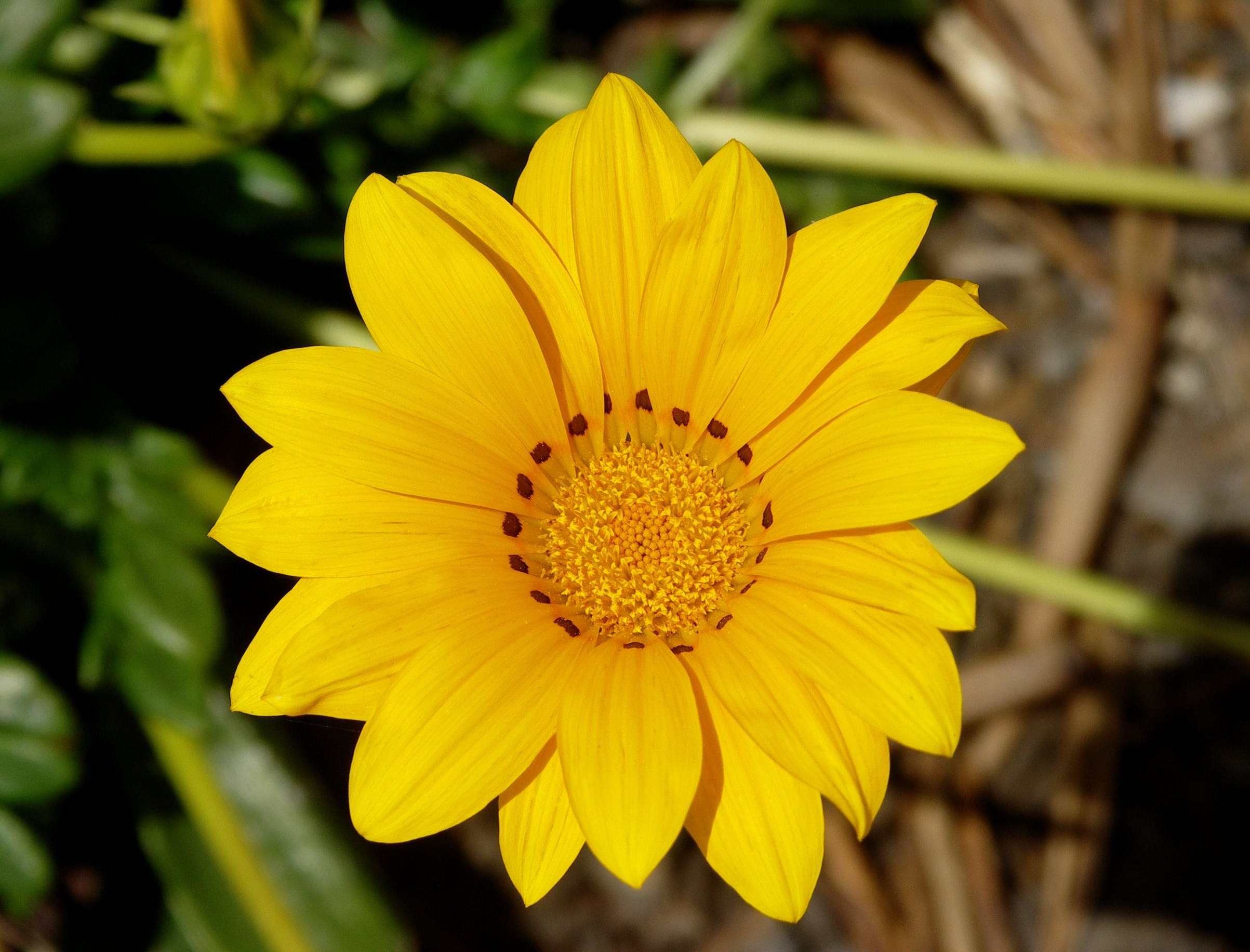
Gazania rigens (flower)

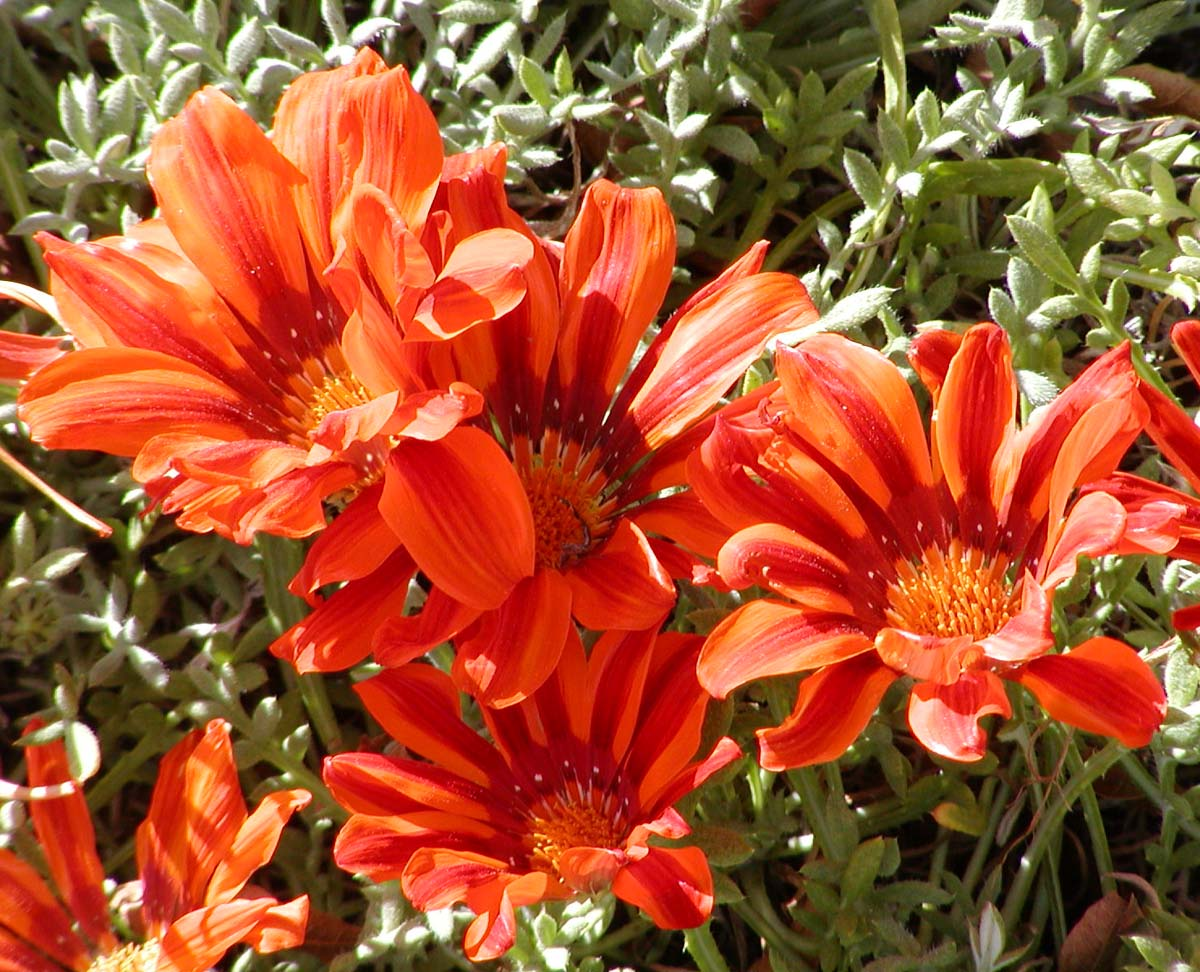
Clumping gazania (Gazania rigens) cultivar known as "Copper King" at the Desert Demonstration Garden in Las Vegas

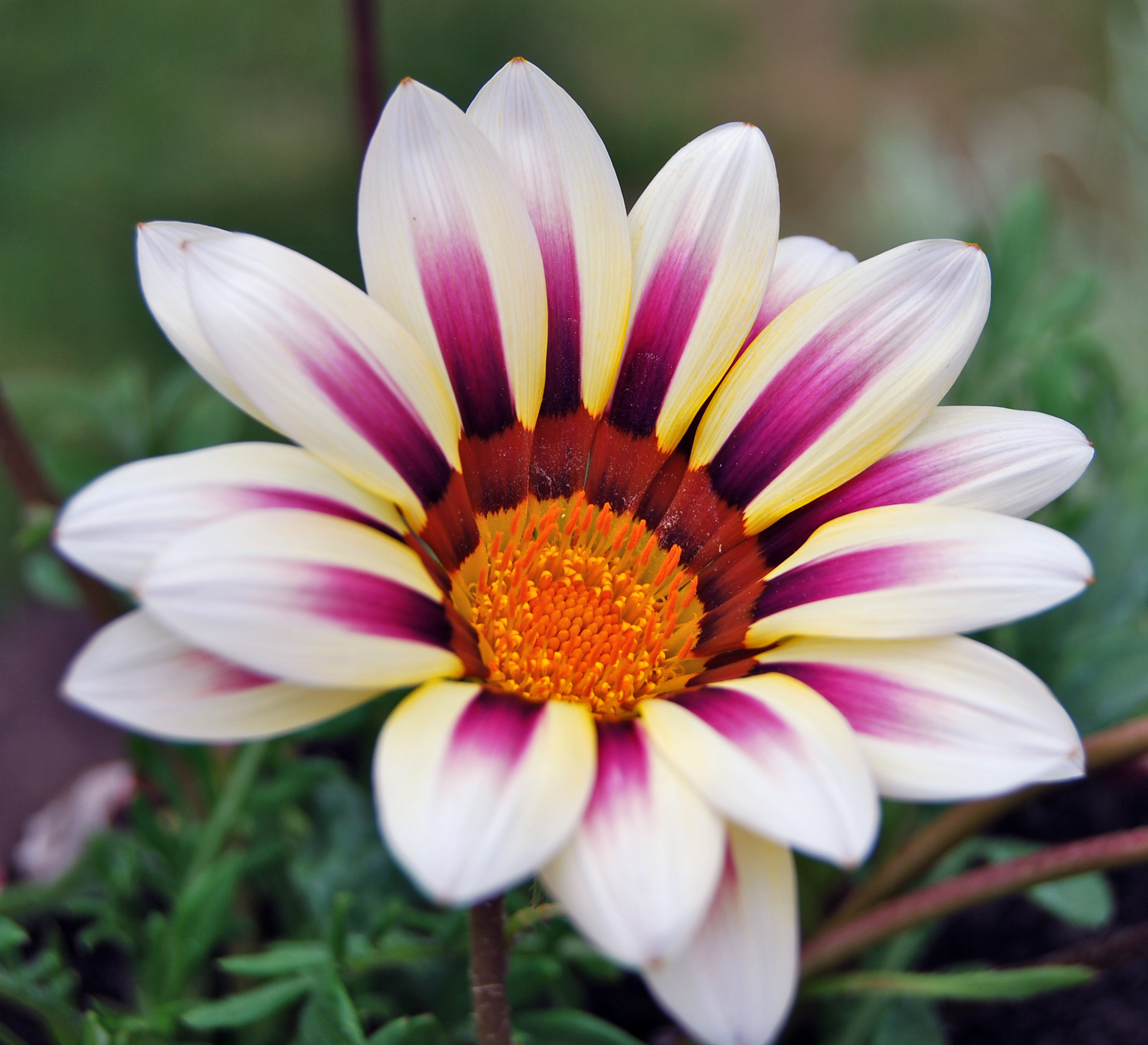
White and purple gazania

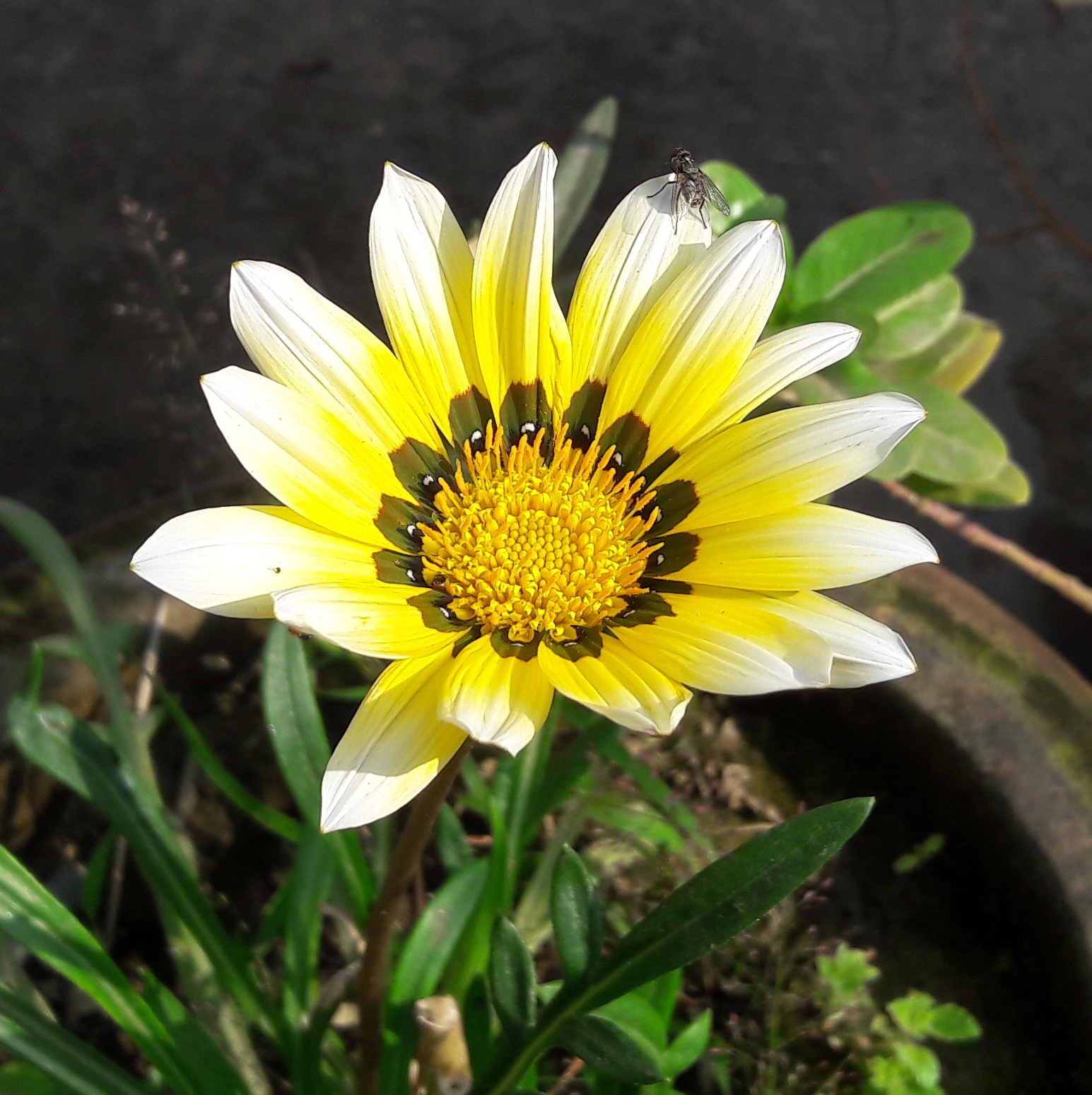
Yellow and White variety of Gazania rigens

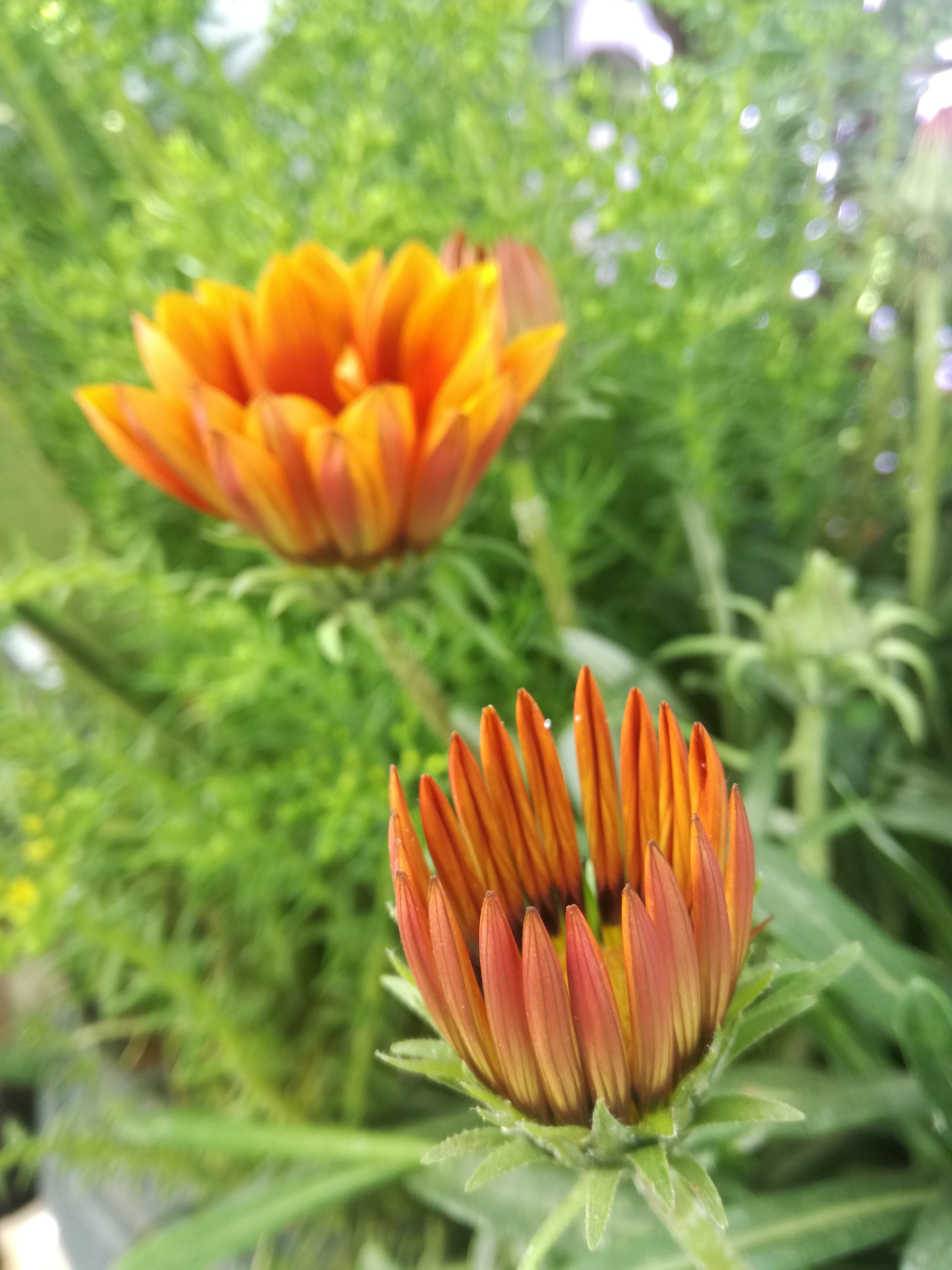
Orange gazania

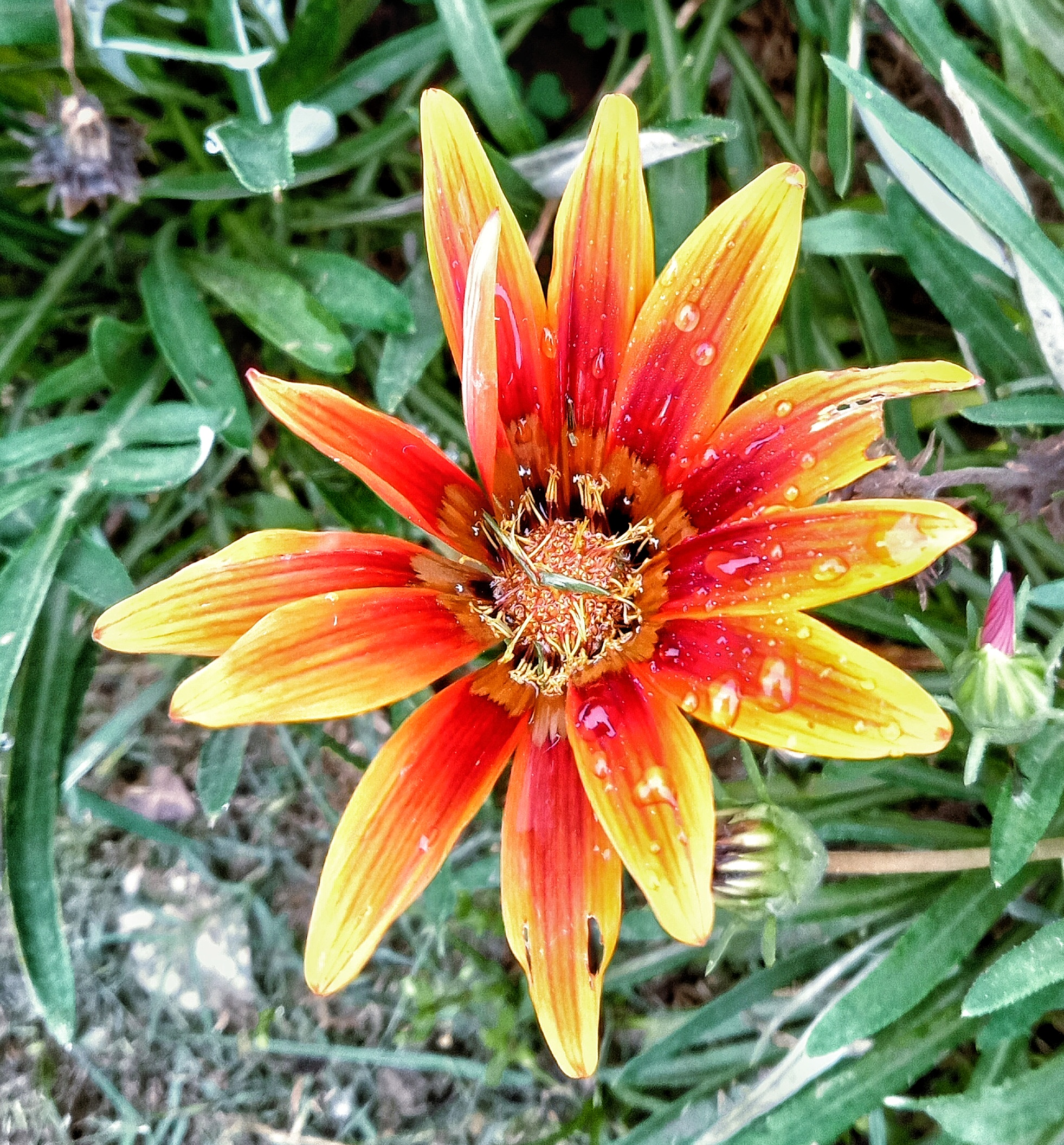
Gazania flower with some dew droplets

Gazania uniflora, known as Golden-flowered Gazania, botanical print from the Curtis's Botanical Magazine, 1821.

== See also ==
- List of Gazania cultivars
