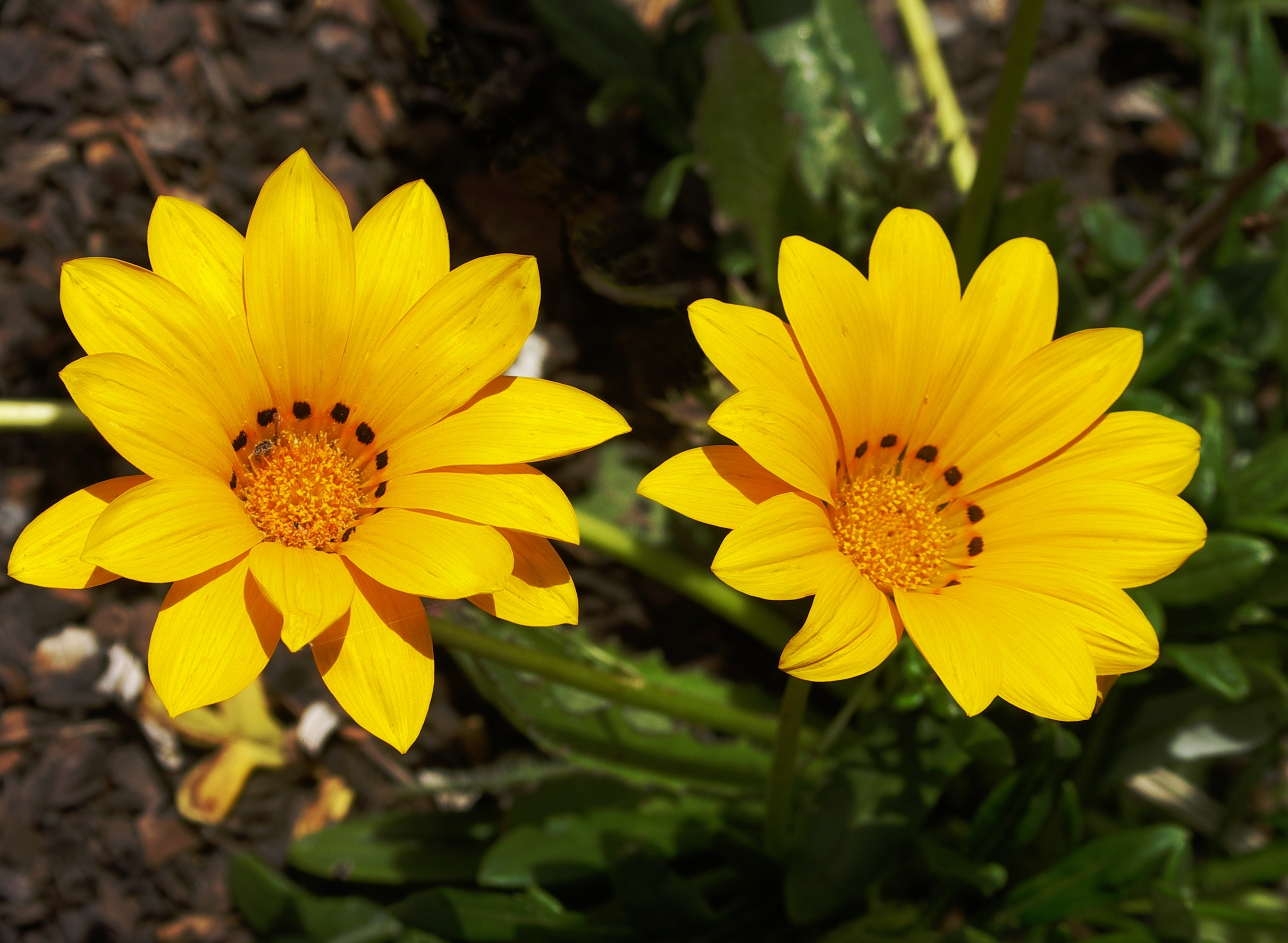

Scientific classification
- Kingdom: Plantae
- Clade: Tracheophytes
- Clade: Angiosperms
- Clade: Eudicots
- Clade: Asterids
- Order: Asterales
- Family: Asteraceae
- Genus: Gazania
- Species: G. rigens

Binomial name
- Gazania rigens (L.) Gaertn.

Synonyms
- Othonna rigens L.; Gorteria rigens L.; Gazania splendens hort. ex Hend. & A. A. Hend.

= Gazania rigens =

Perennial plant in the daisy family from South Africa

Gazania rigens (syn. G. splendens), sometimes called treasure flower, is a species of flowering plant in the family Asteraceae, native to coastal areas of southern Africa. It is naturalised elsewhere and is widely cultivated as an ornamental plant.

== Description ==
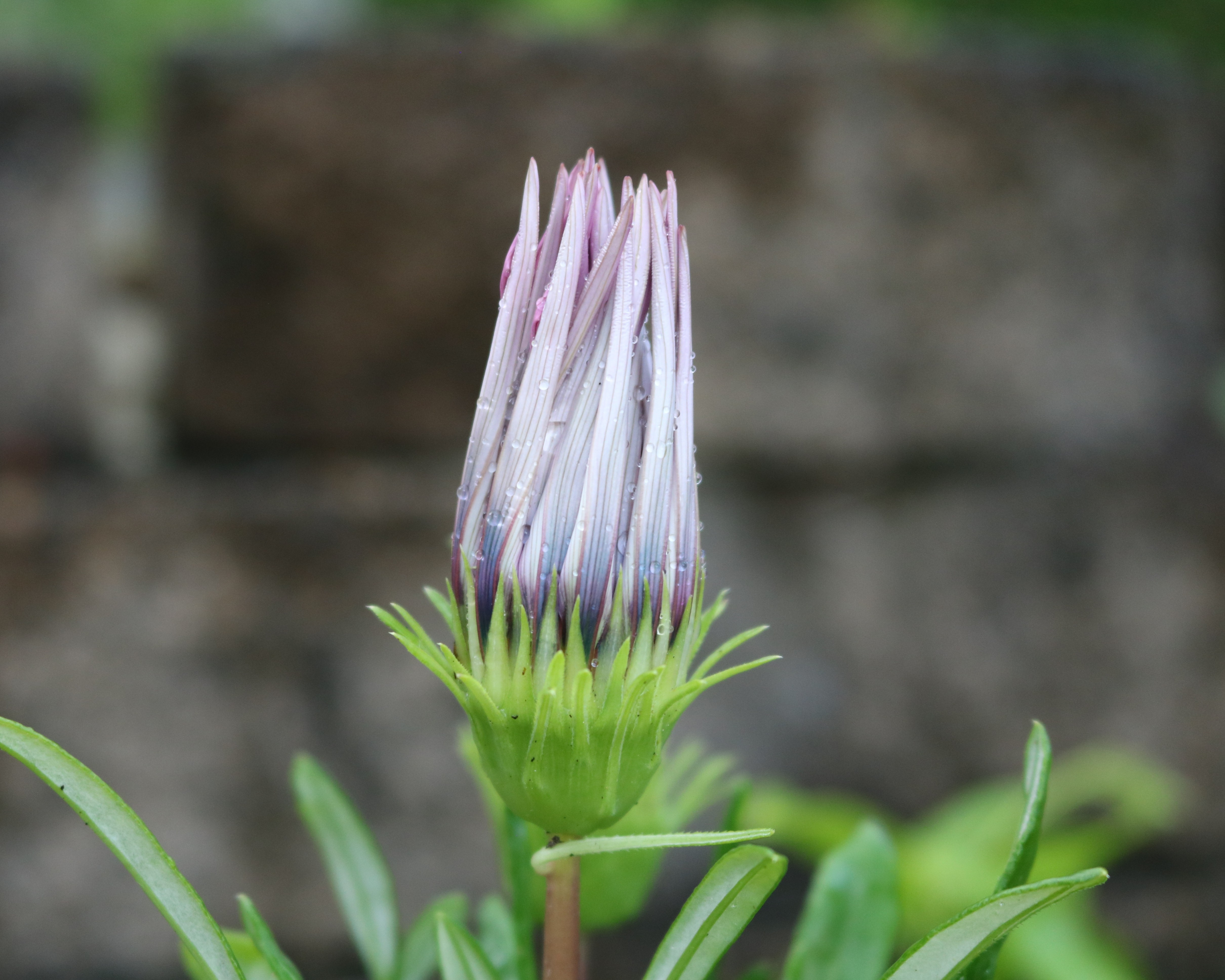
A Gazania rigens flower with closed petals in the early evening.

Gazania rigens is a spreading, low-growing, half-hardy perennial, growing to 50 cm (20 in) tall and wide, with blue-grey foliage and brilliant yellow, daisy-like composite flowerheads throughout the summer. It is a herbaceous plant that is perennial in South Africa and in the Mediterranean regions, and annual in the gardens of colder regions. It rarely exceeds 30 cm (12 in) and forms tufts, often very abundant. Its leaves all basal, numerous, narrow and more or less lanceolate, usually entire, sometimes pennatilobed. The obverse of the leaves is shiny green, the lapel grayish white.

Like all compounds, gazania flowers in flower heads that are often taken for simple flowers. The capitula are solitary at the end of peduncles just beyond the leaves. Each capitulum is formed by a central disc of tubular flowers, surrounded by ligulate peripheral flowers, whose color is very variable. The orange-yellow flowers are however the most numerous, often with black spots at the base of the ligules. The fruit is an achene, containing several seeds.

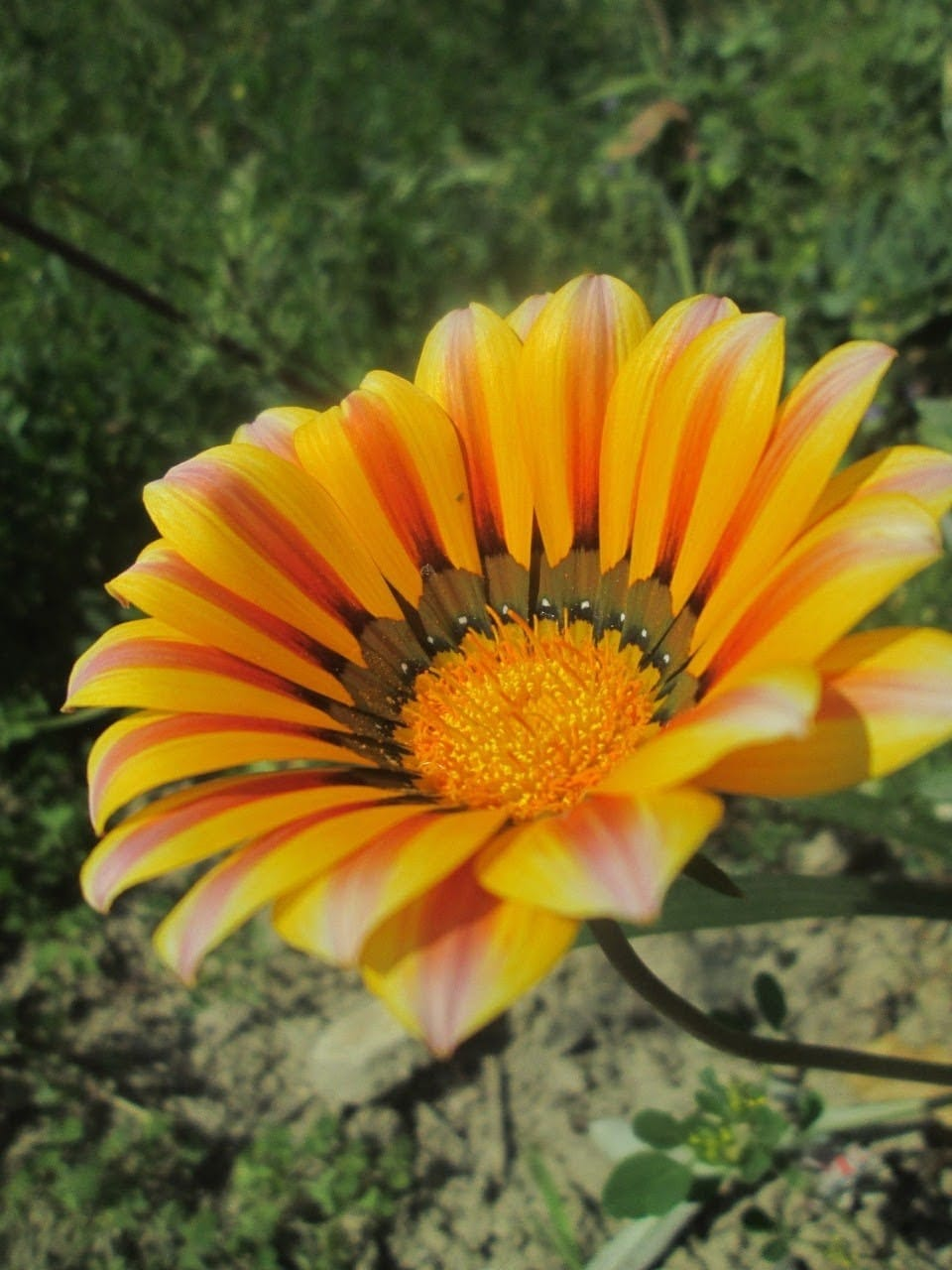
Close-up of Gazania flower, showcasing its composite inflorescence structure.

== Naturalisation ==
Well adapted to the Mediterranean climate, it is native to South Africa and Mozambique. It has become naturalised on the Mediterranean shores, and in places like the Azores, Australia, New Zealand, the United Kingdom, France, Portugal, California, and Argentina. The generic name of the plant is dedicated to Theodore of Gaza (1398-1478), who translated the botanical works of Theophrastus, from Greek to Latin.

It is a declared weed in the islands of Madeira, Sicily, and Sardinia.

In Australia, where it is known as coastal gazania, the species has become naturalised on coastal dunes and roadsides in the Central Coast and Sydney regions of New South Wales as well as the coast of South East Queensland. In South Australia it is found in the southern Mount Lofty area as well as on the Eyre peninsula. Many gazania species have become invasive species after escaping gardens. They have started taking over vast tracts of agricultural land in South Australia, Victoria and parts of Western Australia. All subspecies of the genus are listed as environmental weeds in the state of Victoria, while the Gazania rigens is listed in Queensland, Tasmania, and New South Wales. South Australia has banned the sale of all gazanias in nurseries; however, nurseries in other states still sell them. The Invasive Species Council has urged the federal government to introduce national regulation to prevent invasive garden plants being sold by nurseries.

== Cultivation ==
Gazania rigens is grown for the brilliant yellow of its blooms which appear against blue-grey foliage in the late spring and throughout the summer. Plants prefer a sunny position and are tolerant of dryness and poor soils. Quite indifferent to the nature of the soil, it looks especially for the sun, its flower heads closing when it is in the shade or when the weather is overcast. It adapts well to drought, heat and strong sun, unlike many other flowers.

Flowering from March to October in the Northern Hemisphere, the flowers are however more numerous and larger in the spring. In temperate regions this plant is usually grown as a half-hardy annual, though it can tolerate light frosts.

== Varieties ==
The currently recognised varieties are:

- G. rigens (L.) Gaertn. var. leucolaena (DC.) Roessler. This variety has grey-white leaves. Its flower heads are yellow, typically without any basal eye-spots. It naturally occurs along the southern coast of South Africa, from Mossel Bay in the west, to Port Elizabeth in the east.
- G. rigens (L.) Gaertn. var. rigens This variety is distinguished by its large 4- to 8-cm flower heads with yellow or orange rays, each with a basal eye-spot. It is only found in cultivation.
- G. rigens (L.) Gaertn. var. uniflora (L.f.) Roessler This variety has leaves that are smooth and green on their upper surface. Its flower heads are yellow, typically without any basal eye-spots. It naturally occurs along the east coast of South Africa, from Knysna in the west, to southern Mozambique in the east. Where its range overlaps with that of G. rigens var. leucolaena, the two varieties often grow alongside each other.

== Gallery ==
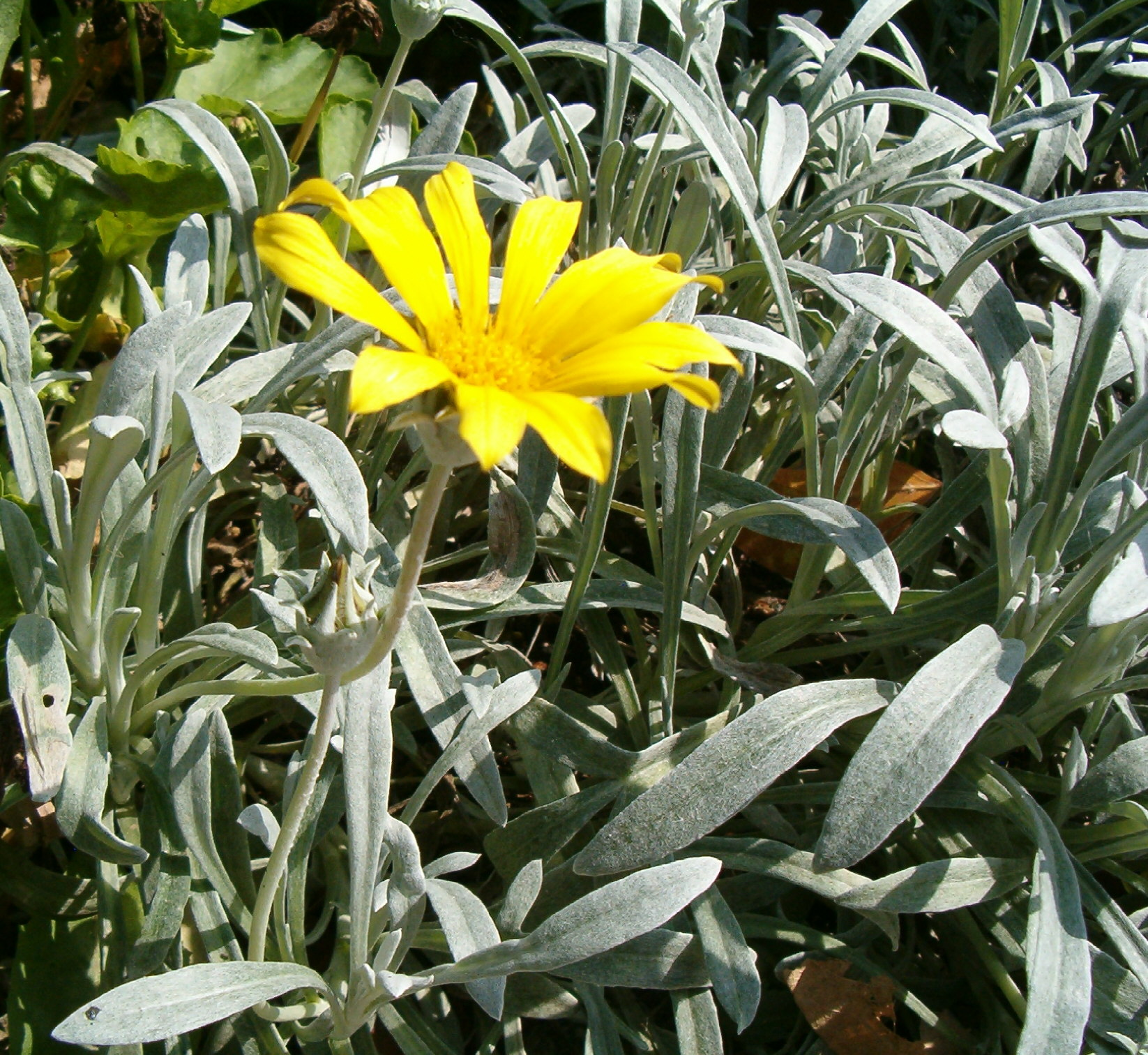
Gazania rigens var. leucolaena has grey-white felted leaves, and yellow flowerheads without dark markings

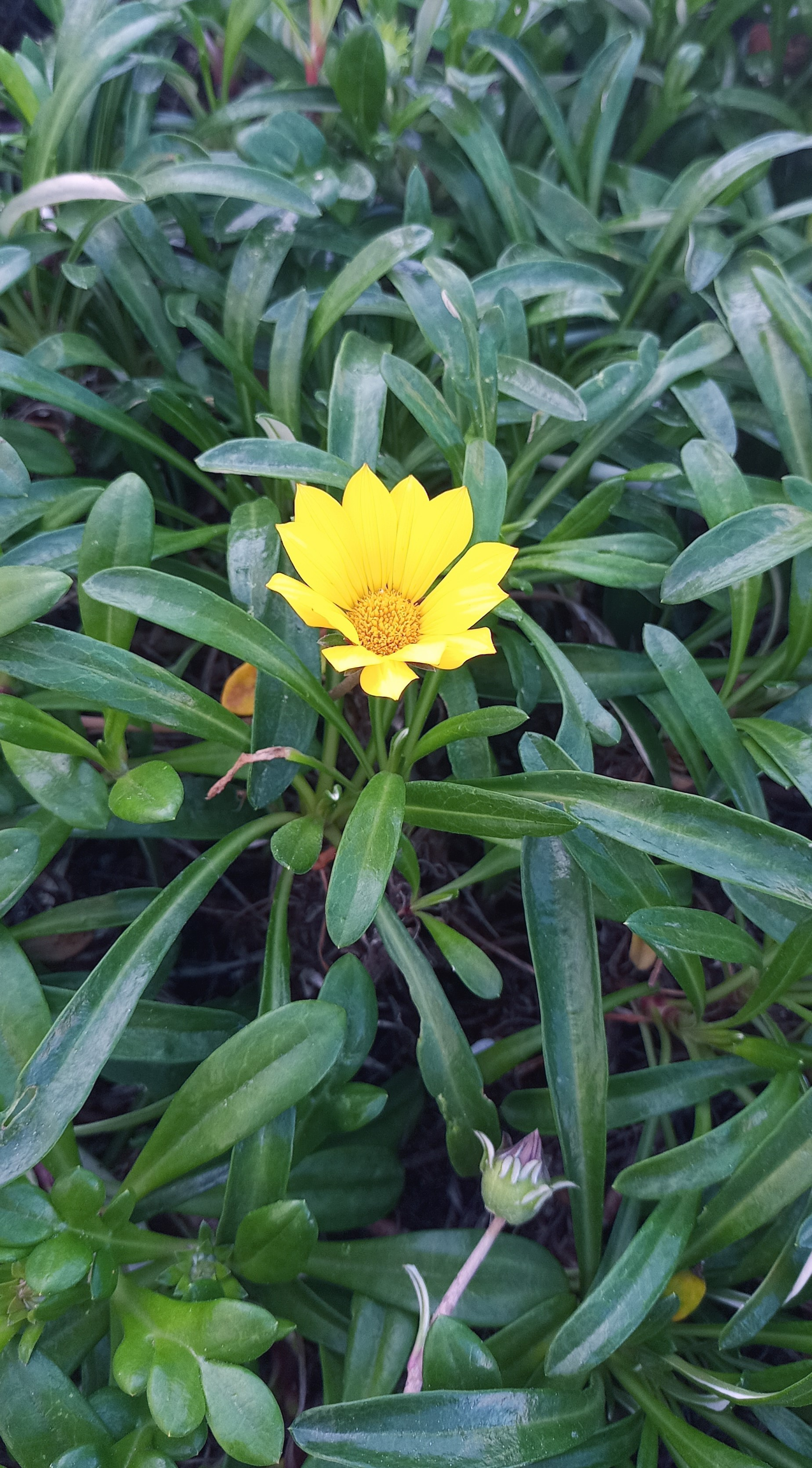
Gazania rigens var. uniflora has smooth green glabrous leaves, and yellow flowerheads without dark markings

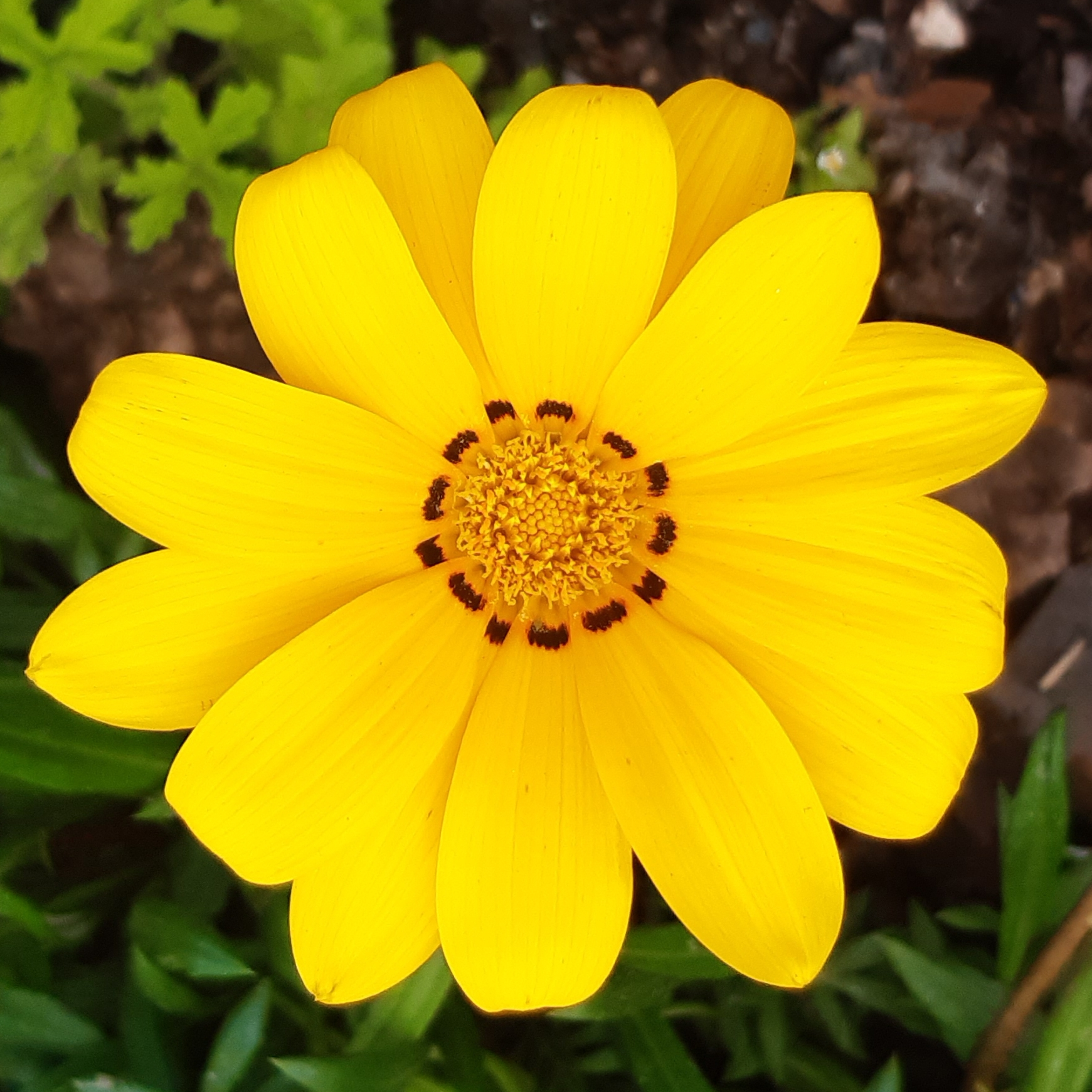
Gazania rigens var. rigens. Yellow flowerhead, with dark markings near the bases of the ray florets (petals)

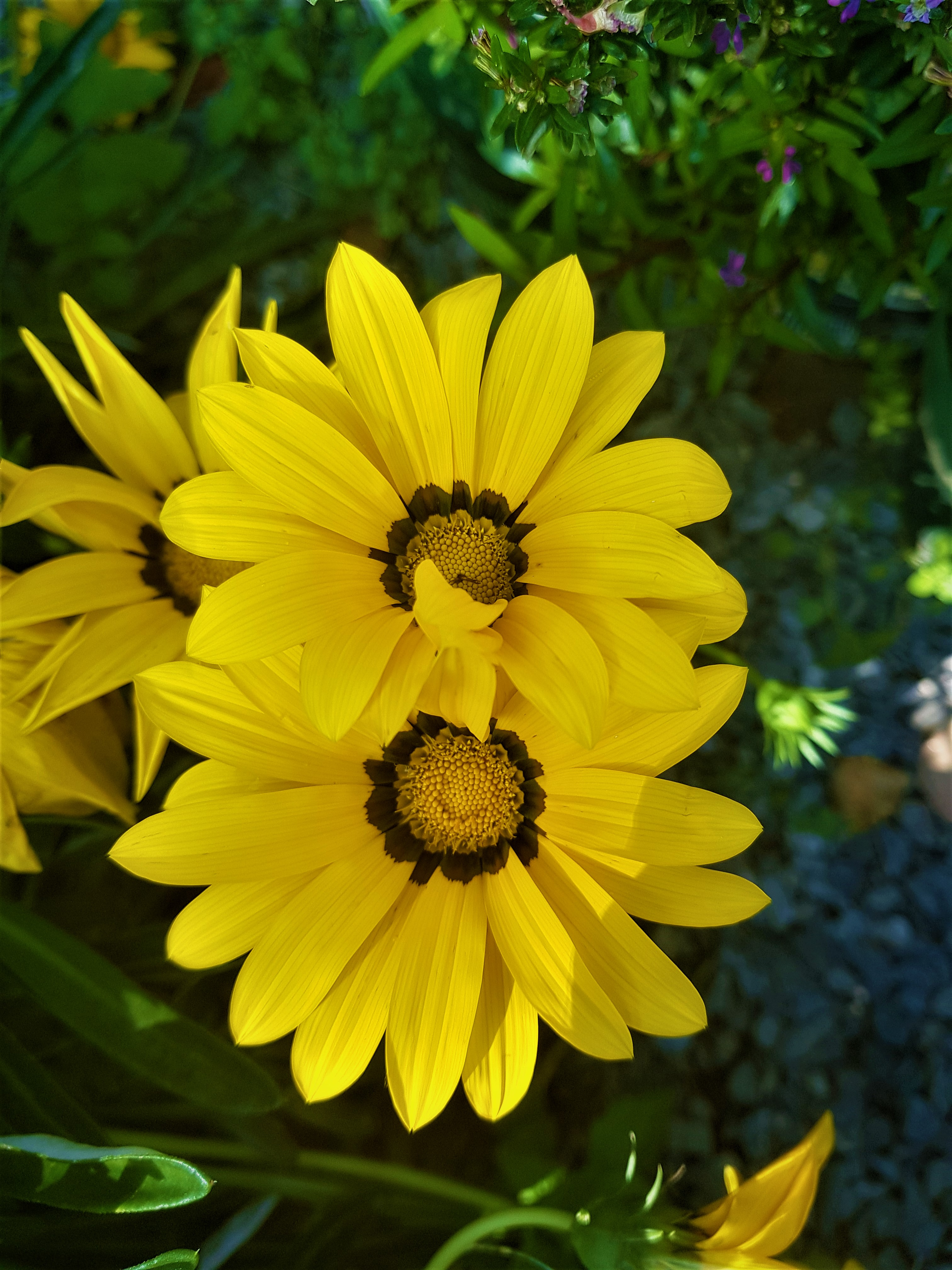
Flower cluster

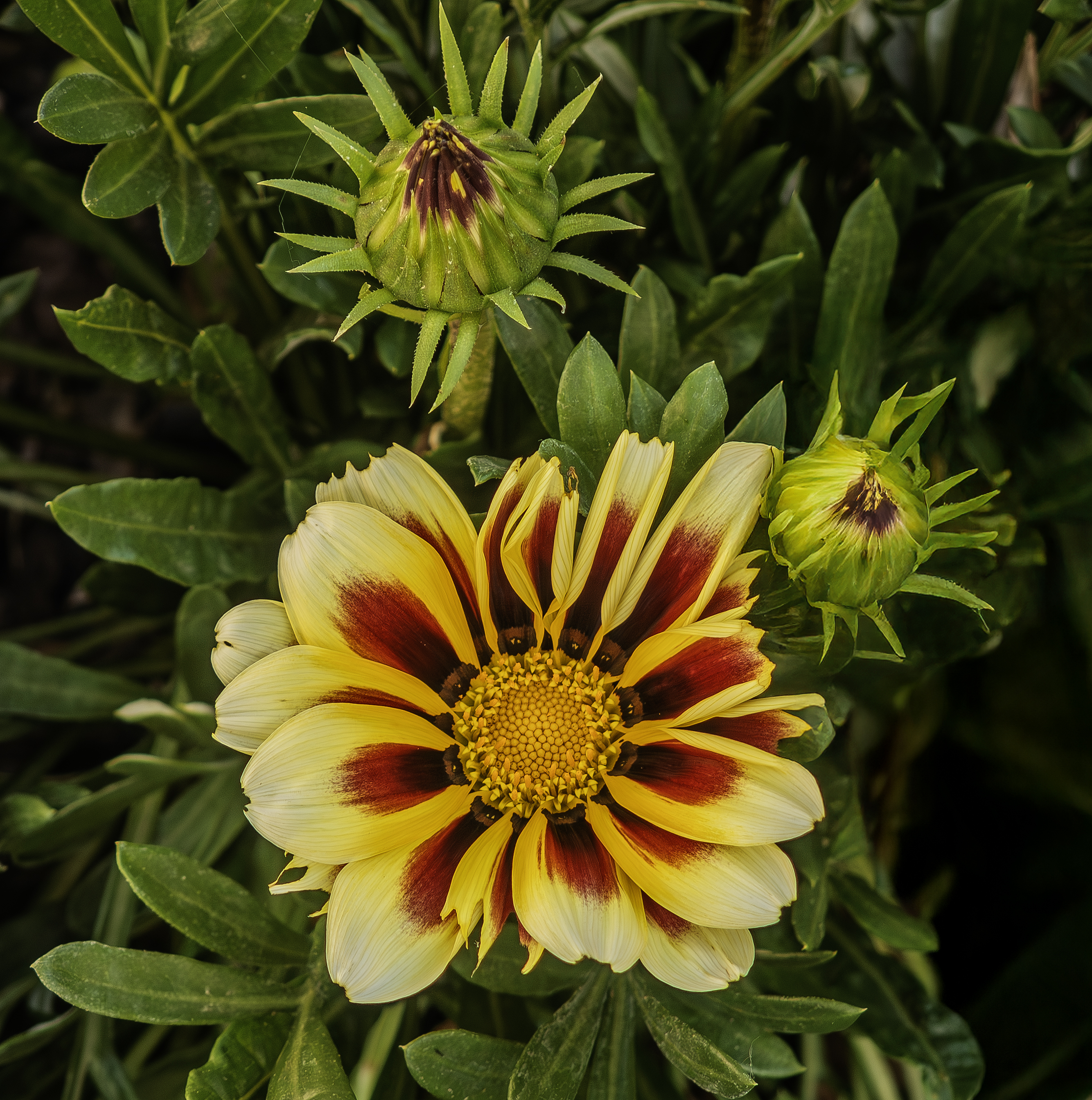
G. rigens (L.) Gaertn. var. rigens - Flower and Buttons

Gazania rigens var. uniflora, known as Golden-flowered Gazania, botanical print from the Curtis's Botanical Magazine, 1821.

== See also ==
- List of Gazania cultivars
