= Gazania thermalis =

Conservation status
- Critically Endangered (IUCN 3.1)

Scientific classification
- Kingdom: Plantae
- Clade: Embryophytes
- Clade: Tracheophytes
- Clade: Angiosperms
- Clade: Eudicots
- Clade: Asterids
- Order: Asterales
- Family: Asteraceae
- Genus: Gazania
- Species: G. thermalis

Binomial name
- Gazania thermalis Dinter

Plant species in the sunflower family

Gazania thermalis is a rare plant in the sunflower family that only grows in three locations in Namibia. Its natural habitat is geothermal wetlands and it is threatened by habitat loss.

== Description ==
Gazania thermalis is a perennial plant with a woody rootstalk and densely crowded basal leaves. It often forms dense colonies. The leaves are 5–7 centimeters long with a width of just 1–1.5 millimeters. They are narrow and grass-like, with or without lobes, and have very small spines long the edges.

Its flower heads bloom atop either a leafless flowering stalk or at the ends of branch or unbranched stems with some leaves. Each flowering head is by itself and has ray flowers that look like petals that are generally yellow, but can also be white or orange. Often the petal will have dark spot at the base, but more frequently are plain yellow.

It is very similar to Gazania othonnites, which has a somewhat white leaf edge and very fine teeth only visible under magnification.

== Taxonomy ==
Gazania thermalis was scientifically described and named in 1921 by Kurt Dinter. The species is classified in the genus Gazania as part of the Asteraceae family. It has no subspecies or botanical synonyms. As of 1973 plants were unable be located in the place where the type specimen was collected. Based upon appearance, the most closely related species is Gazania othonnites, which is from the country of South Africa. However, Gazania thermalis has not yet had its DNA compared with other species of its genus.

== Range and habitat ==
Gazania thermalis is endemic to Namibia in southwest Africa. There, by 2004, it was only known from three locations in or near brackish hot springs. It is possible that other populations of the plant exist, but have not yet been documented. The largest known population has only around 250 plants and is in a poor condition. It only grows in somewhat to moderately salty soils at elevations of 1,276–1,400 meters.

It is rated as critically endangered on the IUCN Red List due to its very limited and fragmented range that is threatened by increasing groundwater usage and development for tourism.
