= Pygmaeascincus koshlandae =

Conservation status
- Least Concern (IUCN 3.1)

Scientific classification
- Kingdom: Animalia
- Phylum: Chordata
- Class: Reptilia
- Order: Squamata
- Suborder: Scinciformata
- Infraorder: Scincomorpha
- Family: Scincidae
- Genus: Pygmaeascincus
- Species: P. koshlandae

Binomial name
- Pygmaeascincus koshlandae (Greer, 1991)

Synonyms
- Menetia koshlandae

Species of lizard

Pygmaeascincus koshlandae, the fine-browed dwarf skink, is a species of skink found in Queensland in Australia.
