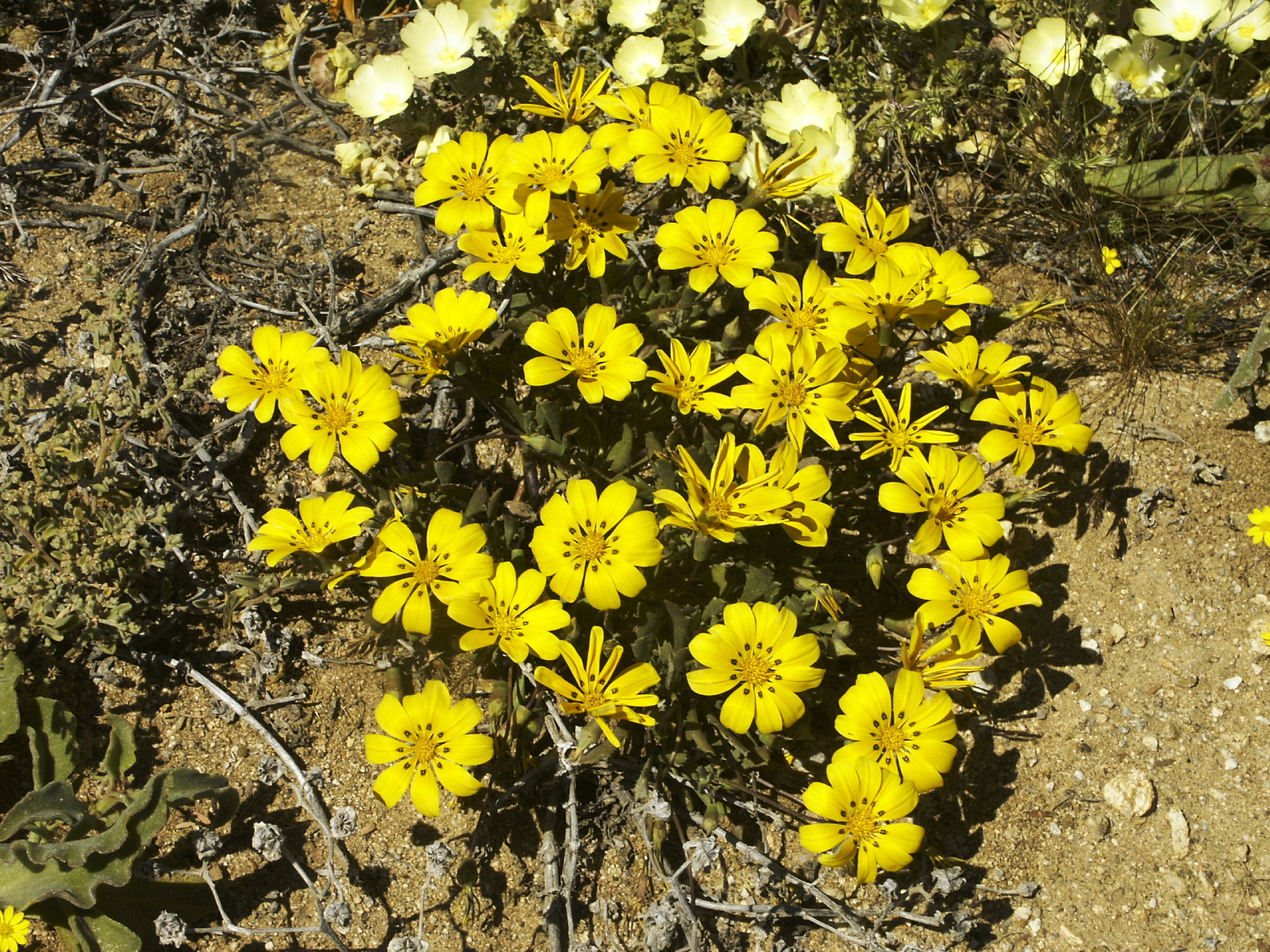
- Gazania lichtensteinii in Goegap Nature Reserve, Namaqualand

Scientific classification
- Kingdom: Plantae
- Clade: Tracheophytes
- Clade: Angiosperms
- Clade: Eudicots
- Clade: Asterids
- Order: Asterales
- Family: Asteraceae
- Genus: Gazania
- Species: G. lichtensteinii

Binomial name
- Gazania lichtensteinii Less.

= Gazania lichtensteinii =

Species of plant

Gazania lichtensteinii (Afrikaans: geelgousblom, "yellow calendula") is a species of flowering plant in the family Asteraceae, native to South Africa (Western Cape and Northern Cape provinces) and Namibia. On the SANBI Red List, it is listed as "safe".

== Description ==
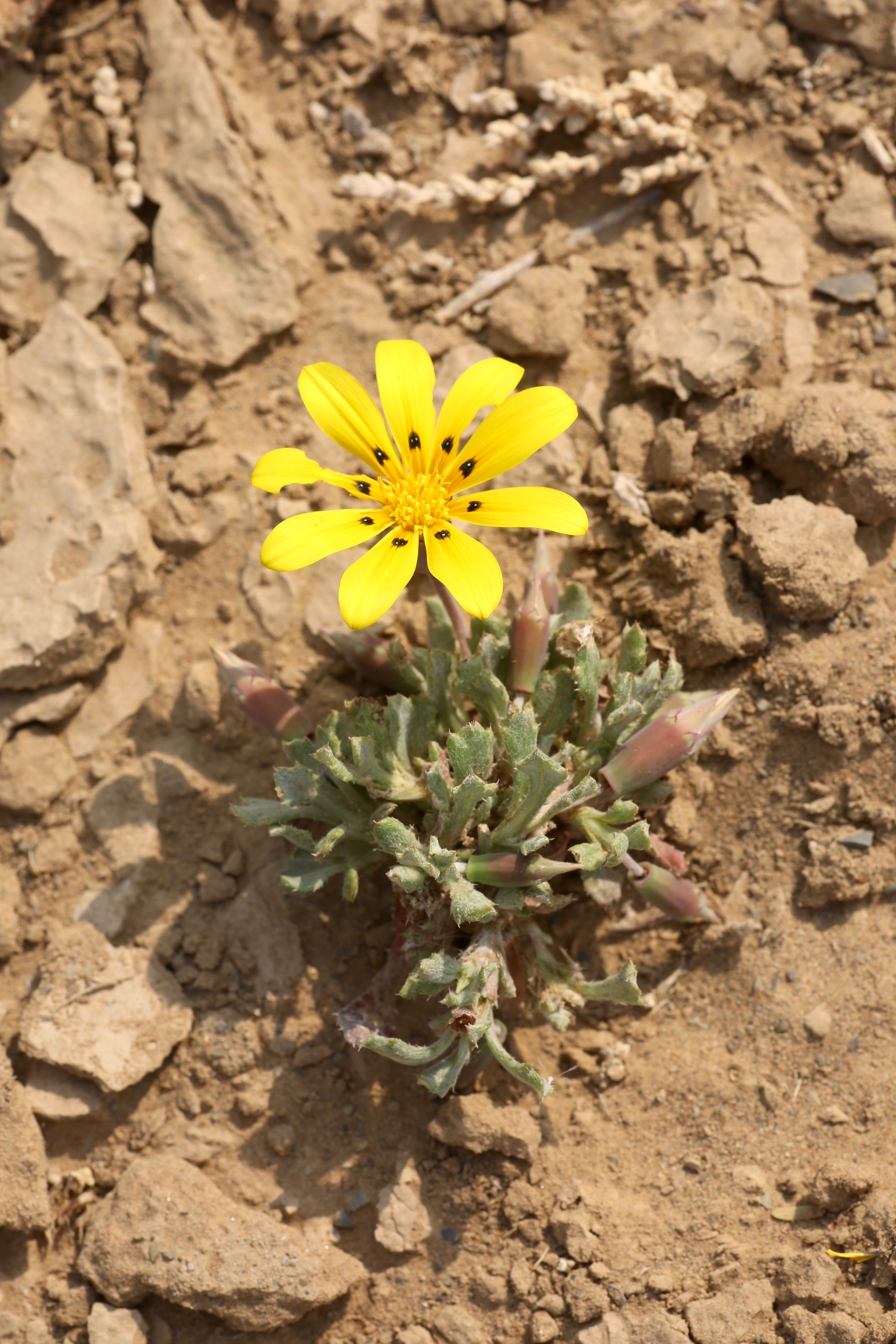
Gazania lichtensteinii specimen showing the distinctively smooth, slender involucres with flat or truncate bases.

This annual plant can be either compact and acaulescent, or form longer stems, and reaches up to 20 cm in height. Like many other Gazania species, the flowers are yellow and approximately 4 cm in diameter.

Distinguishing characteristics of this species are the glabrous (smooth) involucres, which are slender in shape with a truncate base that often appears to have clear collar around it. The leaves are obovate to oblanceolate, usually 4 cm long. The leaves have dentate (toothed) margins, and a tomentose (woolly) underside.

== Distribution and ecology ==
The distribution of Gazania lichtensteinii extends from southern Namibia, southwards across much of the western half of South Africa, including the Namaqualand, the Tanqua Karoo, the Gamka Karoo and parts of the western Little Karoo.

It is commonplace in the Succulent Karoo. The small seeds have fluffy tufts that spread in the wind. Young seedlings grow best on rough, barren ground where there is little competition from established plants. Ostriches in particular tend to feed on them.
