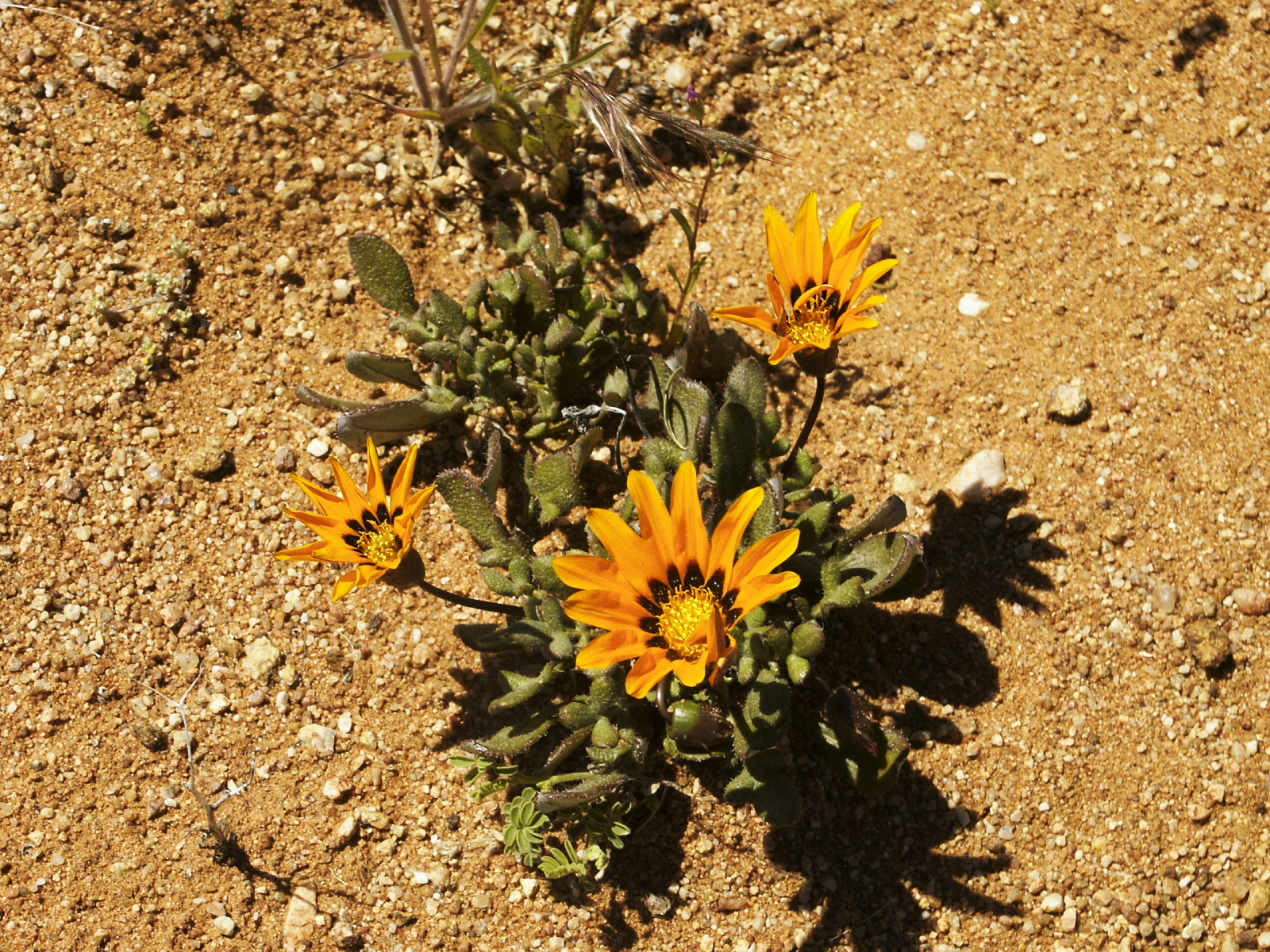

Scientific classification
- Kingdom: Plantae
- Clade: Tracheophytes
- Clade: Angiosperms
- Clade: Eudicots
- Clade: Asterids
- Order: Asterales
- Family: Asteraceae
- Genus: Gazania
- Species: G. heterochaeta

Binomial name
- Gazania heterochaeta DC. (1838)

Synonyms
- Gazania humilis E.Mey. ex DC. (1838); Meridiana heterochaeta Kuntze (1891)

= Gazania heterochaeta =

Species of plant

Gazania heterochaeta is a species of flowering plant in the family Asteraceae, native to South Africa (Western Cape and Northern Cape provinces) and Namibia.

== Description ==
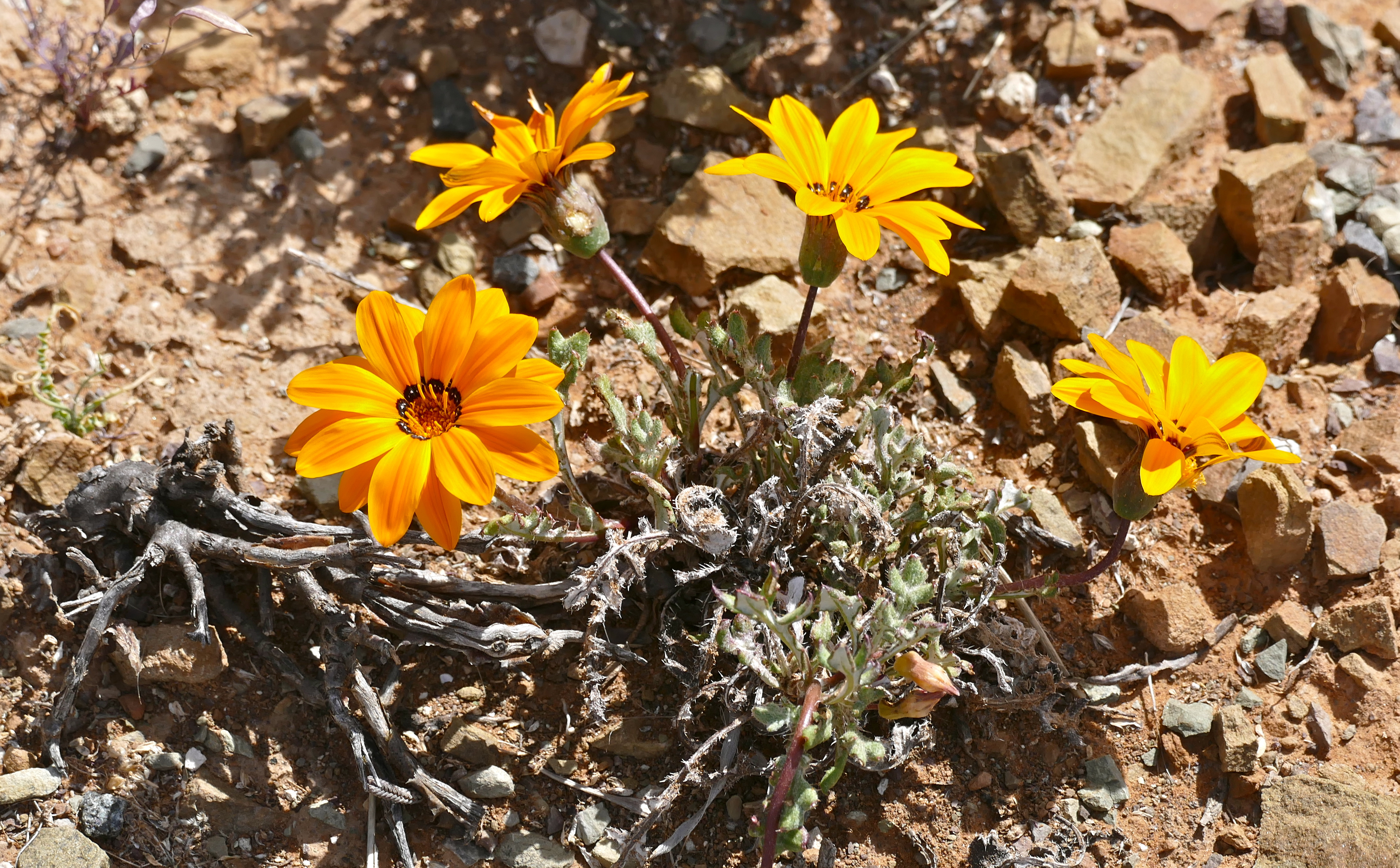

The flowers are yellow-to-orange, with an involucre that is 7-10mm wide and obtusely bell-shaped (campanulate). Distinguishing characteristics of this species are the involucre scales. At the top of the involucre, it usually has two rows of terminal scales (there are sometimes a few occasional parietal scales); the scales of the outer row are more than 4mm long, while the inner scales are less than 4mm long.

The leaves are obovate and simple (or only weakly pinnate), with rounded tips, entire margins, and echinate or araneose-tomentose (woolly) surfaces. In its growth form, G. heterochaeta is a compact perennial and forms basal rosettes with only relatively short stems.
