= List of Gazania cultivars =

This list of Gazania cultivars includes plant cultivars of the South African genus Gazania.

Cultivar	Image	Colour - petals	Colour - centre	Notes	Reference
'Aztec'		cream/maroon	yellow		
'Aztec Queen'		multi-coloured		clumping	
'Burgundy'					
'Christopher Lloyd'		rose	green		
'Colorama'		mixed			
'Copper King'		orange, with markings			
'Cookei'		deep orange/olive green	yellow		
'Daybreak Bright Orange'		orange	yellow		
'Daybreak Garden Sun'		yellow	yellow		
'Daybreak Red Stripe'					
'Dorothy'		yellow	yellow		
'Fiesta Red'		dark orange-red			
'Fire Emerald'		various, emerald petal bases			
'Gold Rush'		orange-yellow, brown basal spots			
'Michael'		yellow	yellow		
'Mini Star White'		white, brown at base	yellow		
'Mitzuwa Yellow'		yellow			
'Moon Glow'		yellow			
'Northbourne'		yellow	yellow		
'Sundance' (Sundance Mixed Hybrids)		gold, bronze and white petals with contrasting stripe			
'Sunburst'		orange	yellow		
'Sunglow'		yellow			
'Sun Gold'					
'Sunrise Yellow'		yellow	black		
Talent Series		multicoloured			

== See also ==
- Lists of cultivars
