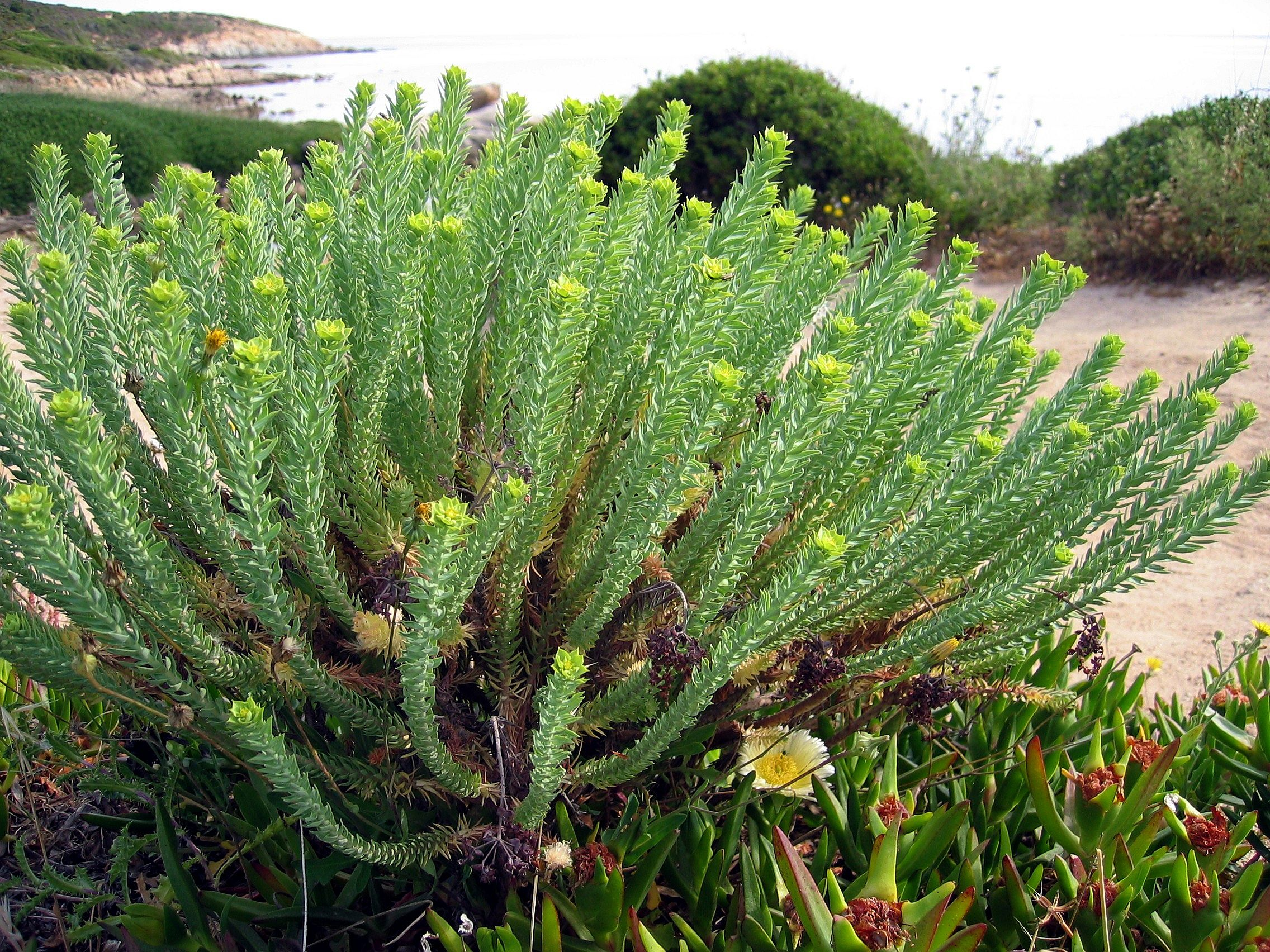
- Sea Spurge in La Revellata, Corsica

Scientific classification
- Kingdom: Plantae
- Clade: Tracheophytes
- Clade: Angiosperms
- Clade: Eudicots
- Clade: Rosids
- Order: Malpighiales
- Family: Euphorbiaceae
- Genus: Euphorbia
- Species: E. paralias

Binomial name
- Euphorbia paralias L.

= Euphorbia paralias =

Species of flowering plant

Euphorbia paralias, the sea spurge, is a species of flowering plant in the family Euphorbiaceae, native to Europe, northern Africa and western Asia.

The species is widely naturalised in Australia. It invades coastal areas, displacing local species and colonising open sand areas favoured by certain nesting birds. Major eradication programmes have been undertaken in some areas, for example by Sea Spurge Remote Area Teams in Tasmania, with great success. A small colony of over 50 plants was discovered at a location on Ninety Mile Beach, on New Zealand's Northland Peninsula in July 2025 where it has believed to have came from sea currents coming from Australia. seven other locations in Northland have also had colonies or plants found in the past 12 months prior to the discovery in July though the species has been recorded as being present since 2012.

== Description ==
Euphorbia paralias is an erect, glaucous, perennial plant, growing up to 70 centimetres (28 in) tall. It has many stems, dividing into 3–5 fertile branches, each branching further. The cauline leaves (arising from the stem, without a stalk) are crowded, overlapping, elliptic-ovate (ovate toward the top of the stems), fleshy and 5–20 millimetres (0.2–0.8 in) long. Leaves on fertile branches are circular-rhombic or reniform. The flower head is on a solitary cyathium, found in upper forks or at the apex, surrounded by bell-shaped bracts. Female flowers have styles that divide into two short stigmas, flowering from September to May. The fruit is a capsule, flattened from above or nearly spherical, with deep furrows, and wrinkled on keels. Seeds are ovoid, pale-grey and smooth. There is a kidney-shaped fleshy outgrowth from the seed coat.

== Habitat ==
This species inhabits sandy sea-shores.
