= Tim Low =

Australian biologist and author

Tim Low AM (born 1956), is an Australian biologist and author of books and articles on nature and conservation.

== Early life ==
Low became interested in reptiles as a teenager, regularly visiting the Queensland Museum after school to study the lizard collections under the guidance of then-curator Jeanette Covacevich. He contributed to the discovery of several new lizard species, collected on travels around Queensland. He described the chain-backed dtella (Gehyra catenata) and had the dwarf litter-skink (Menetia timlowi) named after him. It was later renamed Pygmaeascincus timlowi.

== Career ==
Low worked part-time at the Queensland Museum as an interpretation officer before developing a career as an independent environmental consultant and writer. For twenty years, he wrote a column in Nature Australia magazine. For two years (2013–2015), Low was co-editor of Wildlife Australia magazine. For two years, he wrote the Wild Journey blog for Australian Geographic and contributed many articles to the magazine. He co-authored a 2023 report that reviewed the causes of Australia's modern extinctions.

His report, Climate Change and Queensland Biodiversity, was announced in Queensland parliament by environment minister Kate Jones in June 2011. In that year, Low traveled to Europe and Alaska to study climate change under the Churchill Fellowship. Low also ran a workshop in Canberra, writing up a report titled Climate Change and Invasive Species. He has written journal articles that caution about the weed threats posed by biofuel crops, agroforestry trees, and pasture plants.

Low lives in Brisbane. He was appointed a Member of the Order of Australia in the 2024 King's Birthday Honours for "significant service to conservation, and environmental education and awareness".

== Publications ==
His seventh book, Where Song Began: Australia's Birds and How They Changed the World, tells the story of Australia as a land of aggressive birds that gave the world its songbirds and parrots. Published in Australia by Penguin and internationally by Yale University Press, it won the Australian Book Industry Awards prize for best General Non-Fiction in 2015 and People's Choice at the Victorian Premier's Literary Awards. It was also shortlisted for the NSW Premier's History Awards.

The New Nature: Winners and Losers in Wild Australia (2002) explains that some native species benefit from human impacts, sometimes going on to cause environmental problems. It won the inaugural Waverley Library Award for Literature, now called the Nib Literary Award, and received a special mention at the Centre for Australian Cultural Studies National Awards. Because of this book, Low was invited to serve on the advisory committee (Biological Diversity Advisory Committee) of then-environment minister, Senator Ian Campbell.

Feral Future: The Untold Story of Australia's Exotic Invaders (1999) surveyed the problems caused by invasive species. It was republished by the University of Chicago Press. An extract was read out in the Australian Senate. Low appeared in a TV New Zealand episode of Assignment named after the book. Feral Future inspired the formation of an NGO, the Invasive Species Council. Low had spoken about its formation at the 18th Global Biodiversity Forum in Mexico in 2001.

His four earlier books helped popularise Australian bush tucker. Four of his books have won national prizes.

He has written chapters and sections for many books.

== Bibliography ==
- Wild Herbs of Australia and New Zealand (1985)
- Wild Food Plants of Australia (1989)
- Bush Tucker (1989)
- Bush Medicine (1990)
- Feral Future: The Untold Story of Australia's Exotic Invaders (1999)
- The New Nature: Winners & Losers in Wild Australia (2002)
- Where Song Began (2014)
