= Invasive Species Council =

Australian non-governmental organisation

The Invasive Species Council (Note: This article is about the Australian Invasive Species Council. There a number of non governmental and governmental organisations of the same name in North America.) is an Australian environmental non-governmental organisation founded in 2002 to provide a specialist policy and advocacy focus on reducing the threat of invasive species that threaten the environment.

== History ==
The Invasive Species Council (ISC) was incorporated in July 2002, and was formed in response to growing concerns regarding the problem of invasive species in Australia.

Founding members include Tim Low, Barry Traill, Kate Blood, and five others.

The initial direction of the ISC was to lobby against all invasive species before governments and private industry, and to work with people to achieve outcomes.

== Activities ==
=== Submissions ===
The ISC makes submissions in its own right or in collaboration with other organisations to governmental inquiries. For example:

- Barriers to effective climate change adaption – Federal Government, Productivity Commission
- Control of invasive animals on crown land – Victorian State Government
- Feral Animal Management – New South Wales State Government
- Marine Pest Biosecurity – Federal Government, Department of Agriculture and Water Resources

=== Lobbying ===
The ISC highlights potential conflicts of interest, for example in 2015, agriculture taking a precedence over the wider environment when biosecurity is overseen by agriculture managers.

The ISC takes on concerns which are obvious to the public but not on governments' plans, for example in 2016, feral deer, and for example in 2016 petitioning multiple federal and state ministers for action on fire ants. The ISC will then provide background and context to Governments' decisions when they respond.

The ISC takes opportunities to build awareness of risks in the public mind and creating political interest, for example in 2014, in regard to the importation of dangerous weed seeds going straight through Australian quarantine checks, and again in 2016 embarrassing eBay into temporary action, for example in 2017, in regard to the smooth newt, and that invasive species are possibly a greater threat to native Australian species than habitat loss which is dramatic and assumed to be more important.

=== Alliances and collaborations ===
The ISC will coauthor academic and technical papers with research bodies. For example, in 2010 they collaborated with CSIRO on biofuel sources becoming weeds due to the inherent nature of many of them having strong weed potential.

They will partner with other organisations, for example Paddy Pallin Foundation, an environmental organisation, on weed management, for example Island Conservation, another environmental organisation, on sustaining biodiversity on islands.

=== Direct science, research, and analysis ===
The ISC also directly undertakes basic science and research, such as in running smooth newt surveys in and around Melbourne.

The ISC research and analysis is cited by others, for example in work by the University of Technology Sydney on recreational hunting.

=== Outreach and engagement ===
The ISC operates a science outreach programme focussed on invasive species impacting on the environment.

==== Froggatt Awards ====
Since 2003 the ISC has presented one or more awards to people who have made a major contribution to protecting Australia's native plants and animals, ecosystems, and people from dangerous new invasive species. The Froggatt Awards are named in honour of Australian entomologist Walter Froggatt.

These awards received exceptional national media coverage, and even international coverage, when one was awarded to the Australian Federal Minister for Agriculture and Water Resources, Barnaby Joyce, in part for the Minister's action in regard to pet dogs incorrectly brought to Australia by the actor, Johnny Depp, and his partner, in April 2015.

==== Publications ====
The ISC has a regular publication, the Feral Herald.

== Structure ==
The ISC is run by a chief executive officer (CEO), and is overseen by a board of directors.

The CEO in 2017 is Andrew Cox.

The first Board President on formation in 2002 was Barry Traill.

The President of the Board from 2014 to 2017 is Esther Abram.

== See also ==
- Invasive species in Australia
