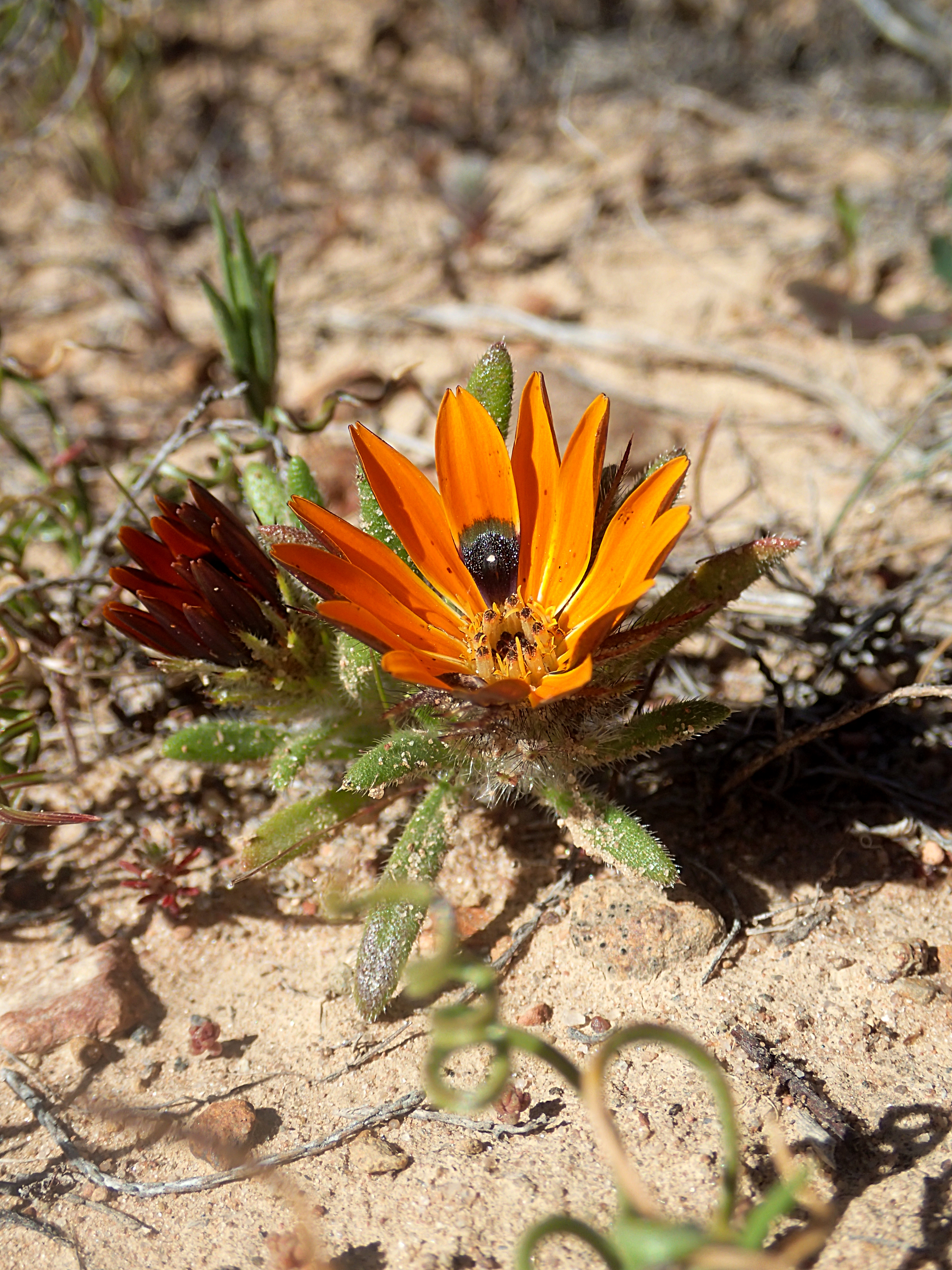
- Gorteria diffusa

Scientific classification
- Kingdom: Plantae
- Clade: Tracheophytes
- Clade: Angiosperms
- Clade: Eudicots
- Clade: Asterids
- Order: Asterales
- Family: Asteraceae
- Subfamily: Vernonioideae
- Tribe: Arctotideae
- Subtribe: Gorteriinae
- Genus: Gorteria; L. (1759)

Type species
- Gorteria personata L.

Synonyms
- Hirpicium Cass. (1820); Ictinus Cass. (1818); Personaria Lam. (1797)

= Gorteria =

Genus of plants

Gorteria is a genus of small annual herbaceous plants or shrubs that is assigned to the daisy family (Compositae or Asteraceae). It includes 12 species native to eastern and southern Africa, ranging from Ethiopia to South Africa. Like in almost all Asteraceae, the individual flowers are 5-merous, small and clustered in typical heads, and are surrounded by an involucre, consisting of in this case several whorls of bracts, which are merged at their base. In Gorteria, the centre of the head is taken by relatively few bisexual and sometimes also male, yellow to orange disc florets, and is surrounded by one complete whorl of 5–14 infertile cream to dark orange ray florets, sometimes with a few ray florets nearer to the centre. None, some or all of them may have darker spots at their base. The fruits remain attached to their common base when ripe, and it is the entire head that breaks free from the plant. One or few seeds germinate inside the flower head which can be found at the foot of plants during their first year. The species flower between August and October, except for G. warmbadica that blooms mostly in May and June. The species of the genus Gorteria can be found in Namibia and South Africa.

== Description ==
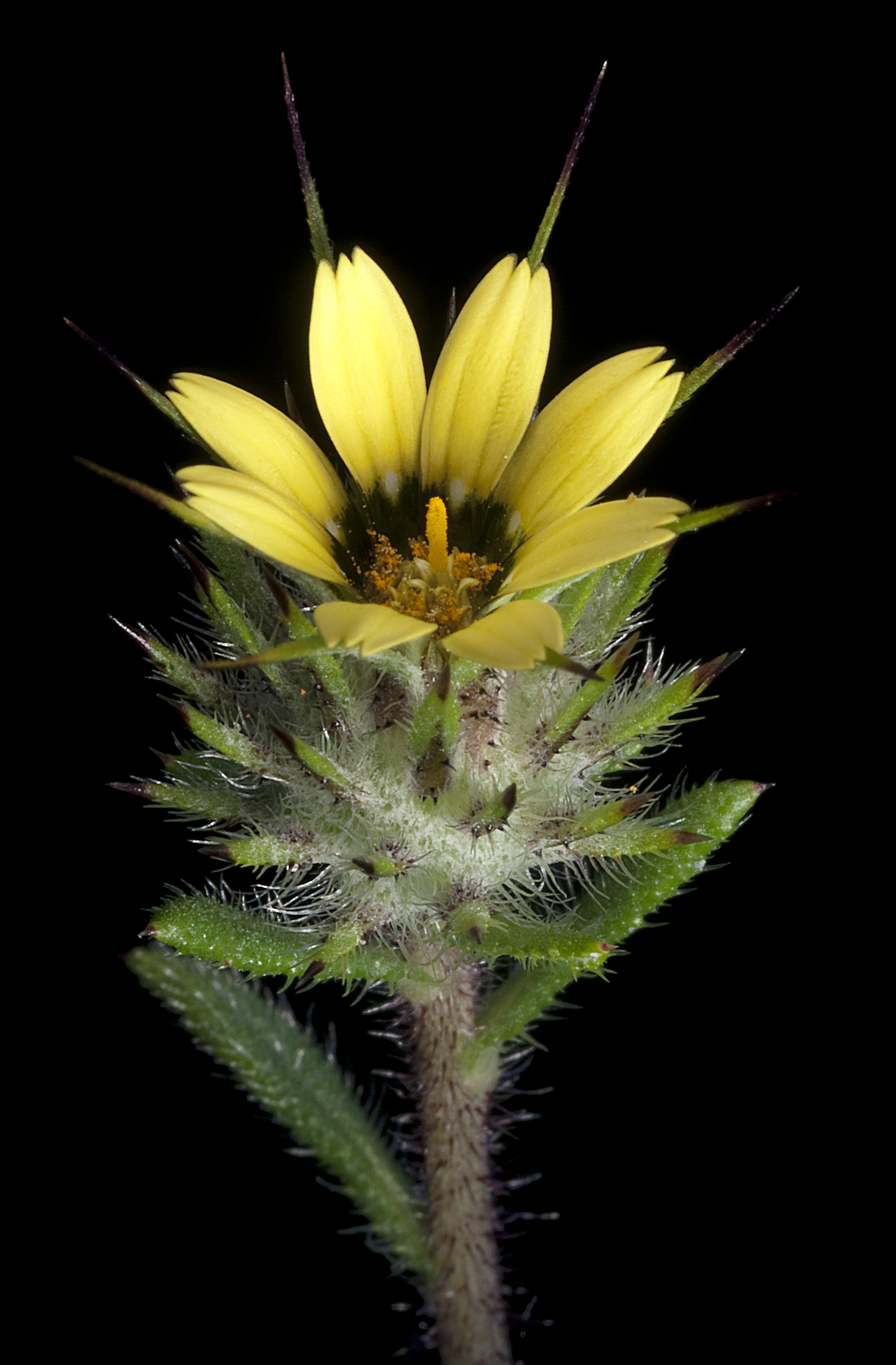
Gorteria personata

Five of the species assigned to Gorteria are always annuals, two always shrublets (G. alienata and G. integrifolia), and one species (G. diffusa) is mostly annual, but populations near the coast in Namaqualand tend to survive and become woody in their second year. The stems are cylindrical (or terete) with 1–2 mm (0.039–0.079 in) long, stiff white hairs, rarely reddish or blackish at their foot, striped along their lengths, and sometimes with short soft hair as well. The alternately set leaves lack a stalk, have margins rolled downward and inward. The upper surface is sparsely to densely set with ½–2 mm (0.02-0.08 in) long stiff white hairs, while the lower surface is whitish felty hairy except on the midvein. The flower heads can be found on their own at the end of the branches, and are enveloped in an involucre, whose bracts are merged at their base only, with short, soft, silky white hairs and long, stiff white hairs with striping along their lengths. These involucres become woody with age, and the entire flower heads detach from the mother plant with the fruits (or cypselas) inside them. Later one new plant emerges (or sometimes up to five) from it. The common base of the florets (called the receptacle) does not have receptacular bracts (or paleas) at the foot of each floret. There are between five and fourteen infertile ray florets that have a base color that ranges between cream and dark orange. At the base there may be darker spots, sometimes jointly creating a ring, but sometimes only present on two or three of the ray florets. The underside has mostly a darker, less clear color and there are some short, striped hairs. The fertile yellow to orange disc florets are somewhat bilateral symmetrical (or zygomorph), deeply incised to form five lobes and have some hairs and glandular hairs. Some set seed, but most of them are functionally male. The anthers do not have tail extensions.

=== Differences with related genera ===
A very particular character for Gorteria is that plants in their first year have an old flower head at their foot, because the cypselas do not part from the flower head when ripe, but germinate remaining in the flower head. Furthermore, the species of Gorteria share spine-like hairs on the corollas of both ray- and disc florets, the bracts of the involucre merged only at their foot, and crystals below the skin of the outer seed coat. All these characters are absent in its near relatives.

== Species ==
12 species are accepted.

- Gorteria alienata (Thunb.) Stångb. & Anderb.
- Gorteria angustifolia (O.Hoffm.) Stångb. & Anderb.
- Gorteria antunesii (O.Hoffm.) Stångb. & Anderb.
- Gorteria beguinotii (Lanza) Stångb. & Anderb.
- Gorteria corymbosa DC.
- Gorteria diffusa Thunb.
- Gorteria gracilis (Welw. ex O.Hoffm.) Stångb. & Anderb.
- Gorteria integrifolia Thunb.
- Gorteria parviligulata (Roessler) Stångb. & Anderb.
- Gorteria personata L.
- Gorteria piloselloides (Cass.) Stångb. & Anderb.
- Gorteria warmbadica Stångb. & Anderb.

== Taxonomy ==
Carl Linnaeus, famous for his introduction of the binominal nomenclature, erected the genus Gorteria, in part II of the 10th edition of his Systema Naturae published in 1759, with the description of the type species Gorteria personata. The genus was named in honour of the Dutch physicians and botanists Johannes de Gorter and his son David de Gorter. Linnaeus' circumscription of the genus was much wider than today, since he included species that now are in several other genera of the Gorteriinae, such as G. squarrosa (= Cullumia squarrosa) in 1760, Gorteria rigens (= Gazania rigens) and G. fruticosa (= Berkheya barbata), both in 1763. Carl Peter Thunberg in 1798 reviewed Gorteria and considered the interlocked margins (or connation) of the involucral bracts diagnostic for the genus, but this is in fact common to the entire subtribe Gorteriinae. He distinguished ten herbaceous species and two woody, seven including G. diffusa and G. integrifolia new to science. In 1818, French botanist Henri Cassini described the new genus Ictinus with type species piloselloides, but in 1824 reassigned it to Gorteria, making the new combination G. piloselloides. In 1820, Cassini erected the genus Hirpicium with type species H. echinulatum. This however is an illegitimate name, since the type specimen is identical to that used by Thunberg to base Oedera alienata on in 1792, and the correct name would be Hirpicium alienatum (= G. alienata). In 1797, Jean-Baptiste Lamarck erected the genus Personaria, and in 1816, Jean Louis Marie Poiret reassigned Personaria personata to Gorteria. In 1832, German botanist Christian Friedrich Lessing restricted Gorteria. In 1838, Augustin Pyramus de Candolle described three further species: G. affinis, G. calendulacea and G. corymbosa. In 1959 and 1973, Helmuth Roessler distinguished two subspecies in G. personata, subsp. personata and subsp. gracilis, and three subspecies in G. diffusa, subsp. diffusa, subsp. calendulacea and subsp. parviligulosa. Only in 2014, Frida Stångberg and Arne Anderberg reassigned Hirpicium alienatum and H. integrifolium to Gorteria, and clarified the relationship between the taxa within Gorteria. In 2018 Stångberg, Karis, and Anderberg concluded that Hirpicium was polyphyletic, and that a number of Hirpicium species, including the type species H. alienatum, were nested within Gorteria. Those species were included within Gorteria, and the Hirpicium species in separate clades were placed in the genera Berkheyopsis and Roessleria.

=== Phylogeny ===
The tribe Arctotideae consists of the subtribes Arctotidinae and Gorteriinae. The Gorteriinae contain two groups, one comprising Berkheya, Cullumia, Cuspidia, Didelta and Heterorhachis, the other one Gorteria and its close relatives of the genera Gazania, Berkheyopsis, and Roessleria. Recent comparison of homologous genes has seriously upset the delineation of the species within Gorteria and prompted the reassignment of Hirpicium alienatum and H. integrifolium to Gorteria. According to this study, the species and their relationships are as expressed in the following tree.

- genus Gorteria
  - G. piloselloides
  - - - G. integrifolia
      - G. alienata
    - - G. personata
      - G. diffusa
      - - - G. warmbadica
          - G. corymbosa
        - G. parviligulosa

=== Reassigned species ===
The species that were originally described as, or moved to Gorteria, which since have been reassigned include the following:

- G. acaulis = Haplocarpha leichtinii
- G. arachnoidea = ?
- G. araneosa = Cuspidia cernua
- G. asteroides = Berkheya fruticosa
- G. barbata = Berkheya barbata
- G. cathamoides = Berkheya barbata
- G. cernua = Cuspidia cernua
- G. ciliaris = Cullumia ciliaris
- G. ciliata = Cullumia patula
- G. cruciata = Berkheya cruciata
- G. echinata = Cuspidia cernua
- G. fruticosa = Berkheya fruticosa
- G. herbacea = Berkheya herbacea
- G. heterophylla = Gazania sp.
- G. hispica = Cullumia aculeata
- G. ilicifolia = Berkheya fruticosa
- G. incisa = Gazania sp.
- G. linearis = Gazania linearis
- G. loureiroana = ?
- G. lyratopinnatifida = Gazania pinnata
- G. mitis = Heterolepis mitis
- G. oppositifolia = Berkheya angustifolia
- G. othonnites = Gazania othonnites
- G. ovata = Relhania rotundifolia
- G. pavonia = Gazania pavonia
- G. pectinata = Gazania pectinata
- G. pinnata Lam. = Gazania pinnata?
- G. pinnata Thunb. = Gazania pinnata
- G. rigens = Gazania rigens
- G. rigida = Stobaea gaertneri
- G. setosa = Cullumia setosa
- G. speciosa = Gazania pectinata
- G. spectabilis = Gazania rigens
- G. spinosa L.f. = Berkheya spinosa
- G. spinosa auct non L.f.(Jacq.) = Cullumia bisulca
- G. squarrosa = Cullumia squarrosa
- G. uniflora = Gazania rigens var. uniflora

== Distribution ==
Representatives of the genus Gorteria can be found in the !Karas Region of Namibia, the Northern Cape and Western Cape provinces, and a few observations in the west of the Eastern Cape of South Africa.
