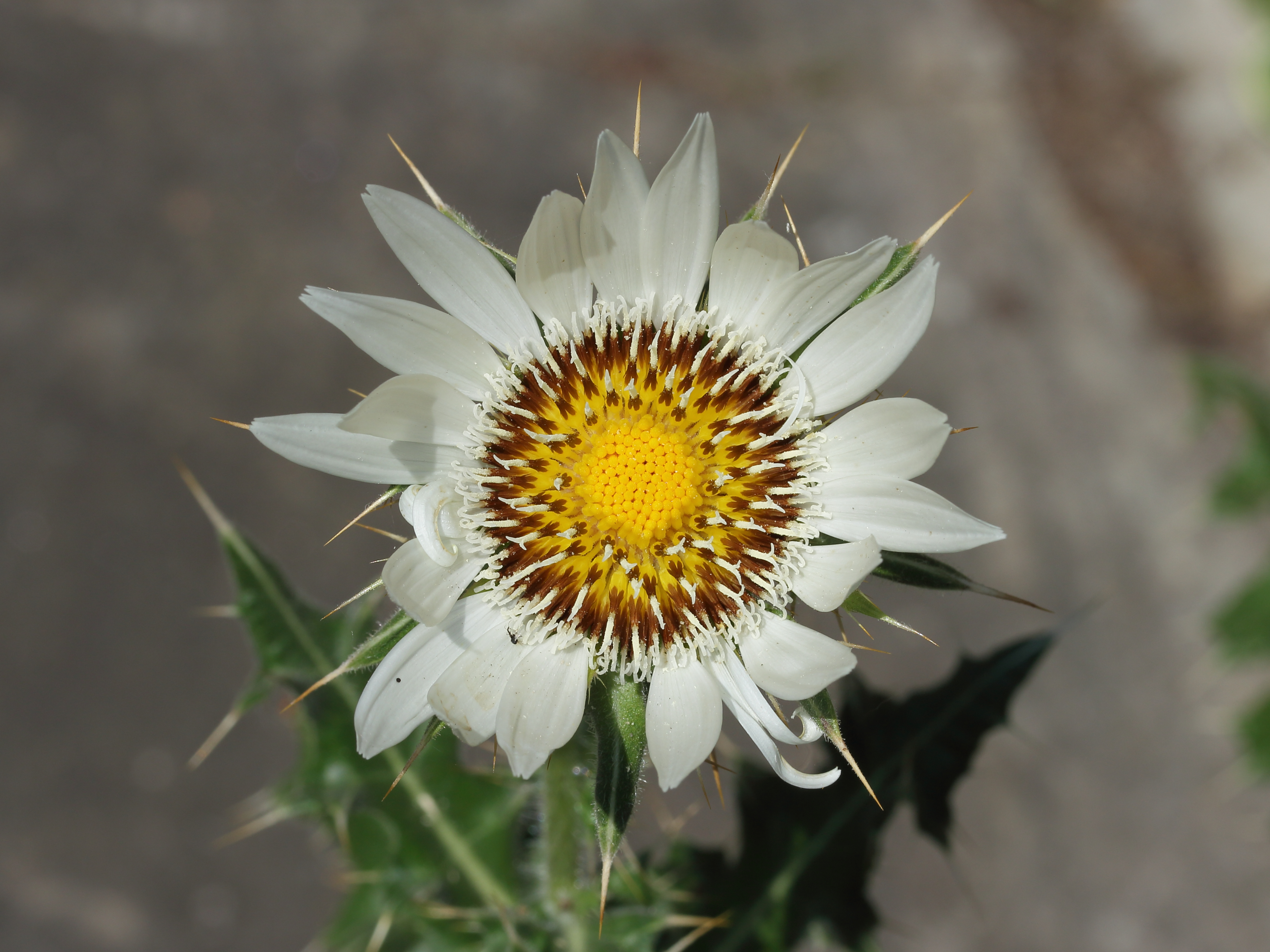
- Berkheya sp.

Scientific classification
- Kingdom: Plantae
- Clade: Tracheophytes
- Clade: Angiosperms
- Clade: Eudicots
- Clade: Asterids
- Order: Asterales
- Family: Asteraceae
- Subfamily: Vernonioideae
- Tribe: Arctotideae
- Subtribe: Gorteriinae
- Genus: Berkheya; Ehrh.

Synonyms
- Agriphyllum Juss.; Apuleja Gaertn.; Arelina Neck.; Crocodilodes Adans.; Evopis Cass.; Rohria Vahl; Stephanocoma Less.; Stobaea Thunb.

= Berkheya =

Genus of flowering plants

Berkheya is a genus of flowering plants in the family Asteraceae. It is distributed in tropical Africa, especially in southern regions. Of about 75 species, 71 can be found in South Africa.

Most species have yellow ray florets, a few have white, and B. purpurea has light purple or mauve florets.

Berkheya purpurea is cultivated as an ornamental plant. Some Berkheya are known as weeds.

Berkheya coddii is a well-known hyperaccumulator. Concentration of Ni as the leaves of this species may reach 7.6% DW Ni.

The genus was named in honor of the Dutch scientist and artist Johannes le Francq van Berkhey.

Berkheya are associated with a variety of weevils in the genus Larinus. The tephritid fruit fly Urophora agromyzella is also found on the plants.

== Species ==
Species include:

- Berkheya acanthopoda
- Berkheya angusta
- Berkheya angustifolia
- Berkheya annectens – thistle-thorn
- Berkheya armata
- Berkheya barbata
- Berkheya bergiana
- Berkheya bipinnatifida
- Berkheya caffra
- Berkheya canescens
- Berkheya cardopatifolia
- Berkheya carduoides
- Berkheya carlinifolia
- Berkheya carlinoides
- Berkheya carlinopsis
- Berkheya chamaepeuce
- Berkheya cirsiifolia
- Berkheya coddii
- Berkheya coriacea
- Berkheya cruciata
- Berkheya cuneata
- Berkheya debilis
- Berkheya decurrens
- Berkheya densifolia
- Berkheya discolor
- Berkheya draco
- Berkheya dregei
- Berkheya echinacea
- Berkheya eriobasis
- Berkheya erysithales
- Berkheya ferox
- Berkheya francisci
- Berkheya fruticosa
- Berkheya glabrata – yellow thistle
- Berkheya griquana
- Berkheya herbacea
- Berkheya heterophylla
- Berkheya insignis
- Berkheya latifolia
- Berkheya leucaugeta
- Berkheya mackenii
- Berkheya macrocephala
- Berkheya maritima
- Berkheya montana
- Berkheya multijuga
- Berkheya nivea
- Berkheya onobromoides
- Berkheya onopordifolia
- Berkheya pannosa
- Berkheya pauciflora
- Berkheya pinnatifida
- Berkheya purpurea – purple berkheya
- Berkheya radula
- Berkheya radyeri
- Berkheya rhapontica
- Berkheya rigida – Augusta thistle, Hamelin thistle
- Berkheya robusta
- Berkheya rosulata
- Berkheya seminivea
- Berkheya setifera
- Berkheya speciosa
- Berkheya sphaerocephala
- Berkheya spinosa
- Berkheya spinosissima
- Berkheya subulata
- Berkheya tysonii
- Berkheya umbellata
- Berkheya viscosa
- Berkheya zeyheri

== Phylogeny ==
Comparison of DNA has indicated that Berkheya in its current composition is paraphyletic because some of its species are more related to Cullumia, Cuspidia, Didelta and Heterorhachis than all species currently recognised as Berkeya among each other.

== Gallery ==
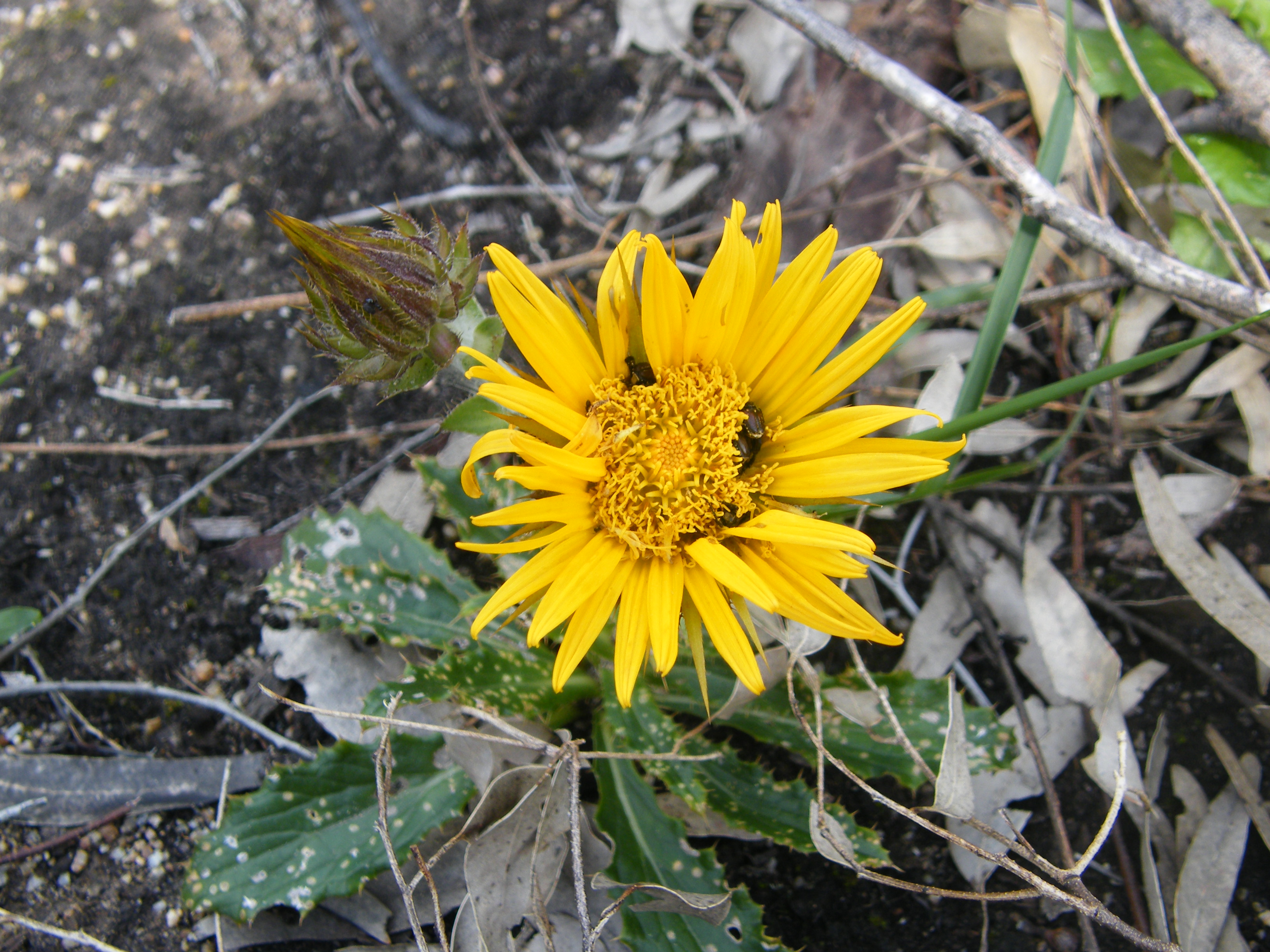
Berkheya armata

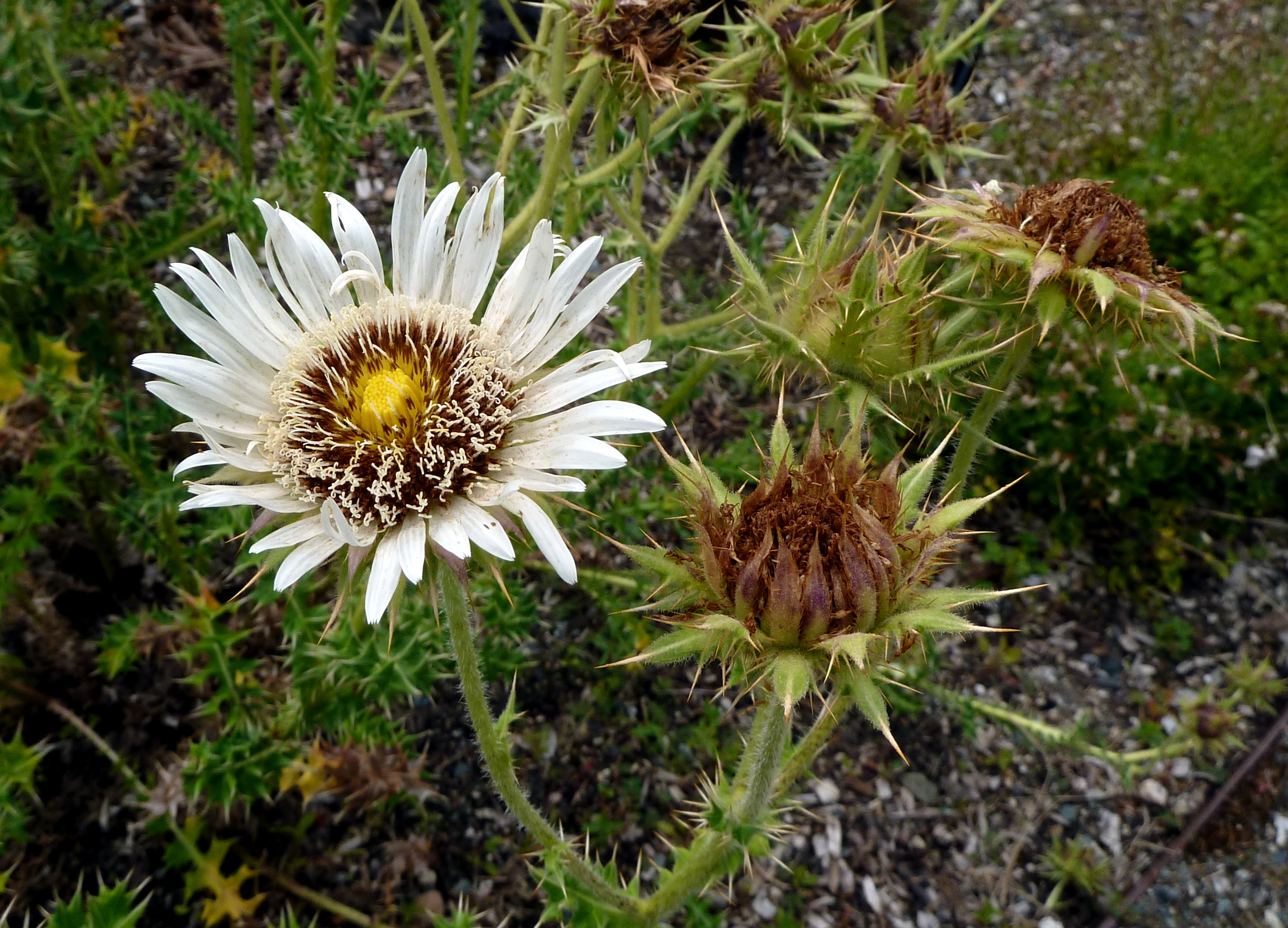
Berkheya cirsiifolia

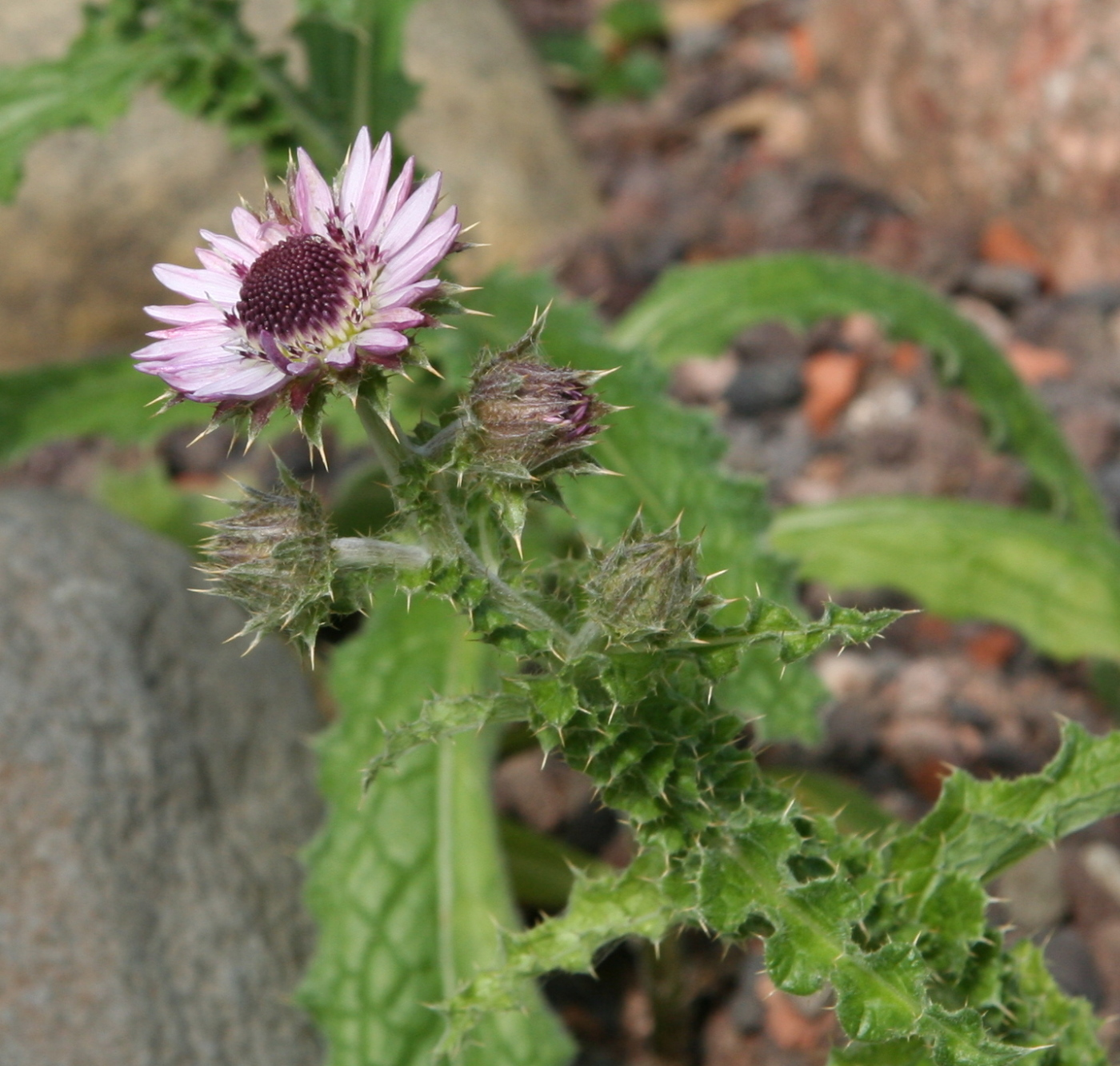
Berkheya purpurea

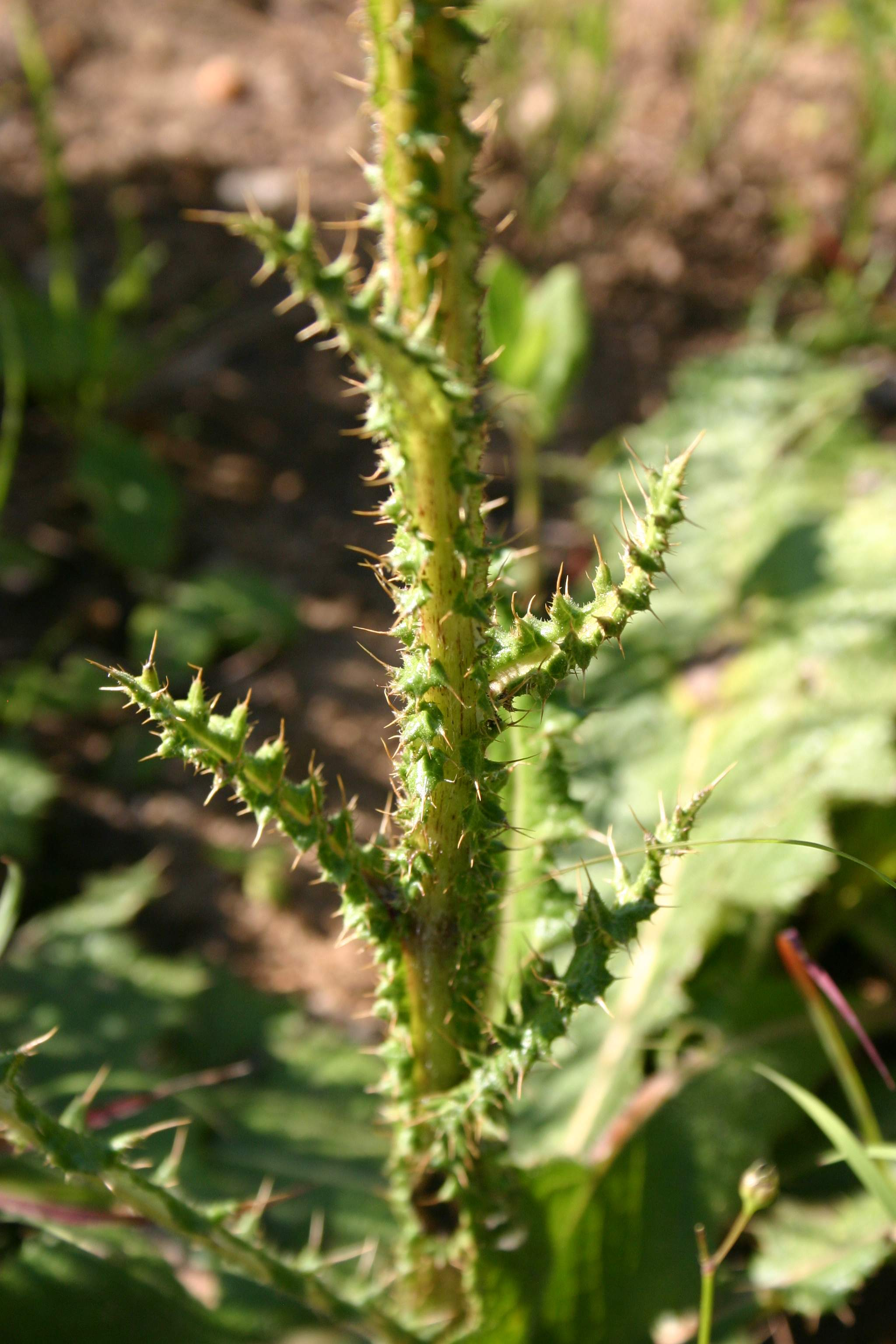
Berkheya radula
