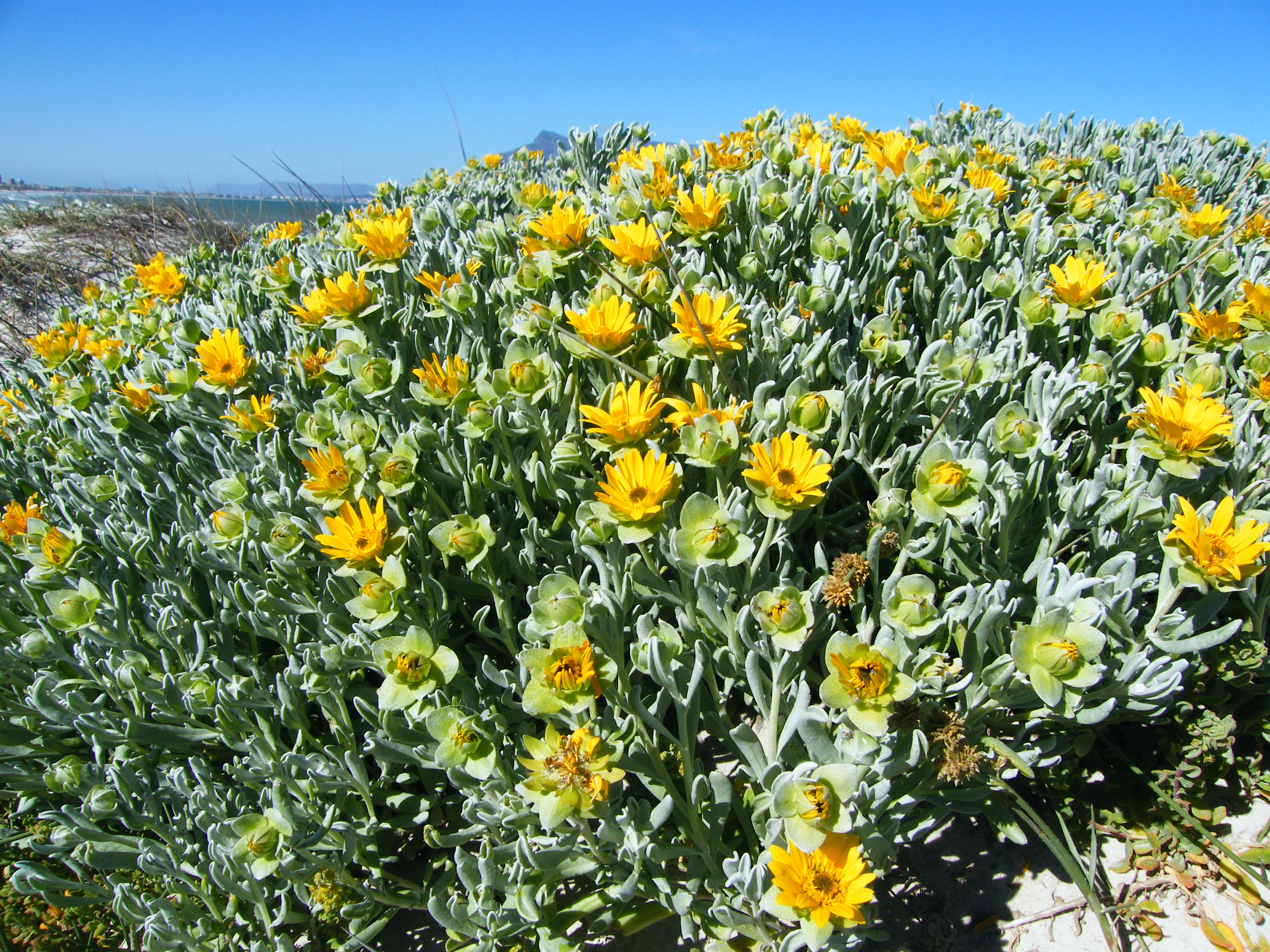
- Didelta carnosa

Scientific classification
- Kingdom: Plantae
- Clade: Embryophytes
- Clade: Tracheophytes
- Clade: Angiosperms
- Clade: Eudicots
- Clade: Asterids
- Order: Asterales
- Family: Asteraceae
- Tribe: Arctotideae
- Genus: Didelta; L'Hér.

Type species
- Didelta tetragoniifolia (syn of D. carnosa) L'Hér.

Synonyms
- Breteuillia Buc'hoz; Favonia Gaertn.; Choristea Thunb.; Distegia Klatt

= Didelta =

Plant genus in the Asteraceae from Southern Africa

Didelta is a genus of shrubs of up to 1 or 2 meter high, with two known species in the daisy family. Like in almost all Asteraceae, the individual flowers are 5-merous, small and clustered in typical heads, and are surrounded by an involucre, consisting of in this case two whorls of bracts, which are almost free from each other. The 3–5 outer bracts are protruding and triangular in shape, the inner about twice as many are lance-shaped and ascending. In Didelta, the centre of the head is taken by 3–5 clusters of bisexual yolk yellow disc florets, sometimes divided from each other by male disc florets, and is surrounded by one complete whorl of infertile yolk yellow ray florets. The common base of the flowerhead swells around the developing fruitlets, become woody and breaks into segments when ripe. The fruitlets germinate within this woody encasing. The species of the genus Didelta can be found in Namibia and South Africa. The genus is called salad thistle in English and slaaibos in Afrikaans.

== Description ==
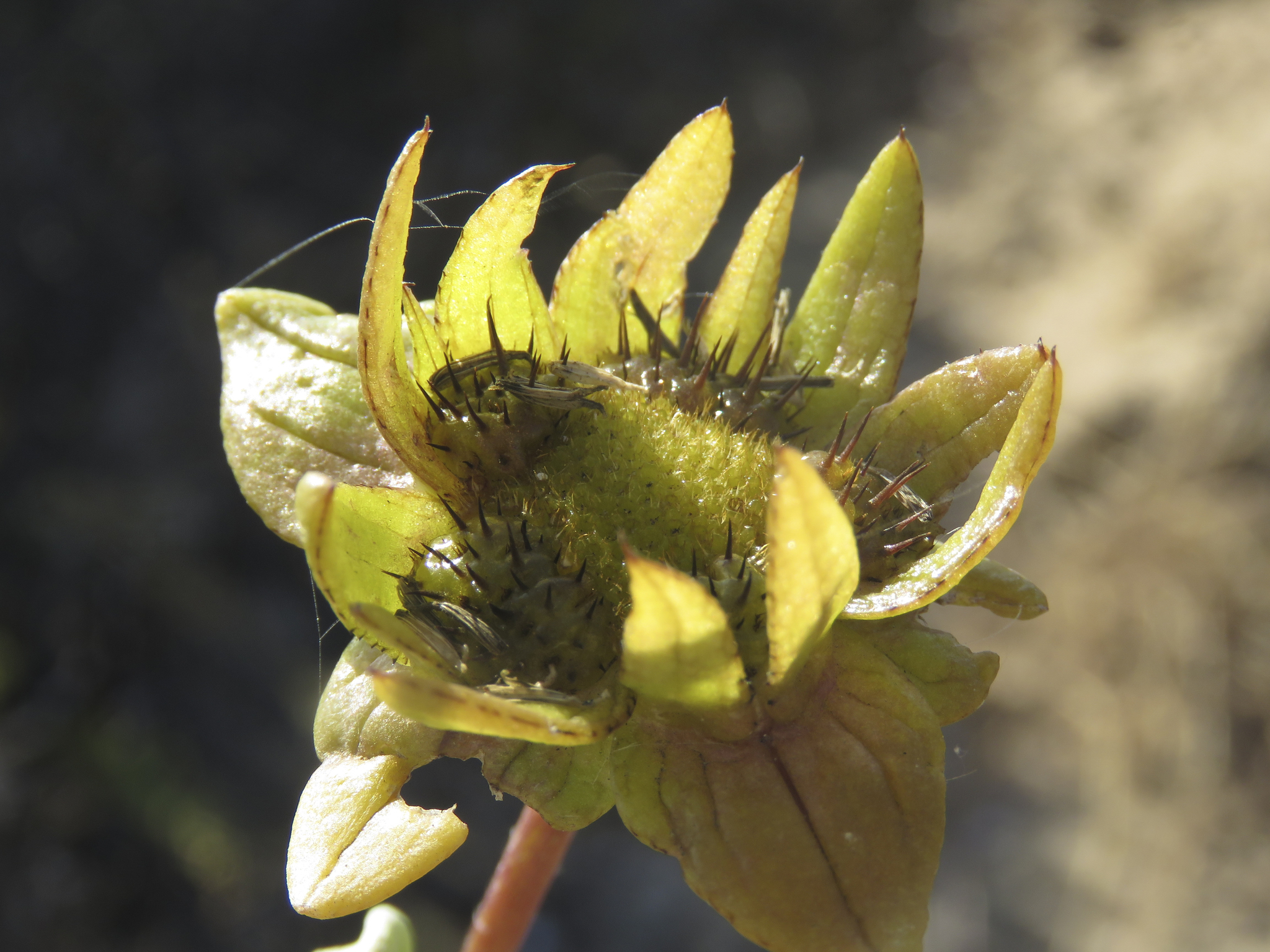
Fruiting head of kusslaaibos, Didelta carnosa

The species assigned to the genus Didelta are more or less succulent shrubs or perennial plants, with or without milk sap, that can have both alternate and opposite leaves, that may be felty hairy or hairless, may have a spiny tip, are seated and have an entire, sometimes spiny margin. The flowerheads sit individually in the leaf axils or on a peduncle. These heads are subtended by 2 rows of free involucral bracts, the outer 3–5 are protruding, triangular in shape, broadest and leaflike, the inner lance-shaped, ascending and may be spiny. Each head consists of a whorl of yellow, infertile ray florets with 4 teeth at their tips, surrounding yellow disc florets that each have five long, free lobes. Adjacent each of the outer involucral bracts, several florets are fertile, and the surrounding parts of the common base of all florets in the head (or receptacle) swell and eventually become woody. The receptacle breaks up at maturity, each section corresponding with one of the persistent outer bracts. These segments break free from the parent plant and act as the dispersal units. The ribbed, flask-shaped, more or less curved fruitlets germinate inside the protective encasement of the woody segments. These are topped by a pappus of winged scales that have merged at their base.

=== Differences between the species ===
D. spinosa lacks milk sap, has hairless, more or less oval leaves with spines that often enclose the stem at base, and the swollen, eventually woody segments of the receptacle containing the fruitlets lack spines. D. carnosa has milk sap, elliptic to linear, variably tomentose leaves, and the swollen and eventually woody segments of the receptacle containing the fruitlets are spiny. Two varieties are distinguished. D. carnosa var. carnosa is hairless or becomes hairless with age, while D. carnosa var. tomentosa remains densely felty hairy at least on the undersides of the leaves.

=== Differences with related genera ===
Cuspidia cernua has bristle-like pappus on top of the fruitlets and the fruiting head remains intact, while both Didelta-species have chaffy pappus and the fruiting head breaks into several triangular segments when ripe.

== Taxonomy ==
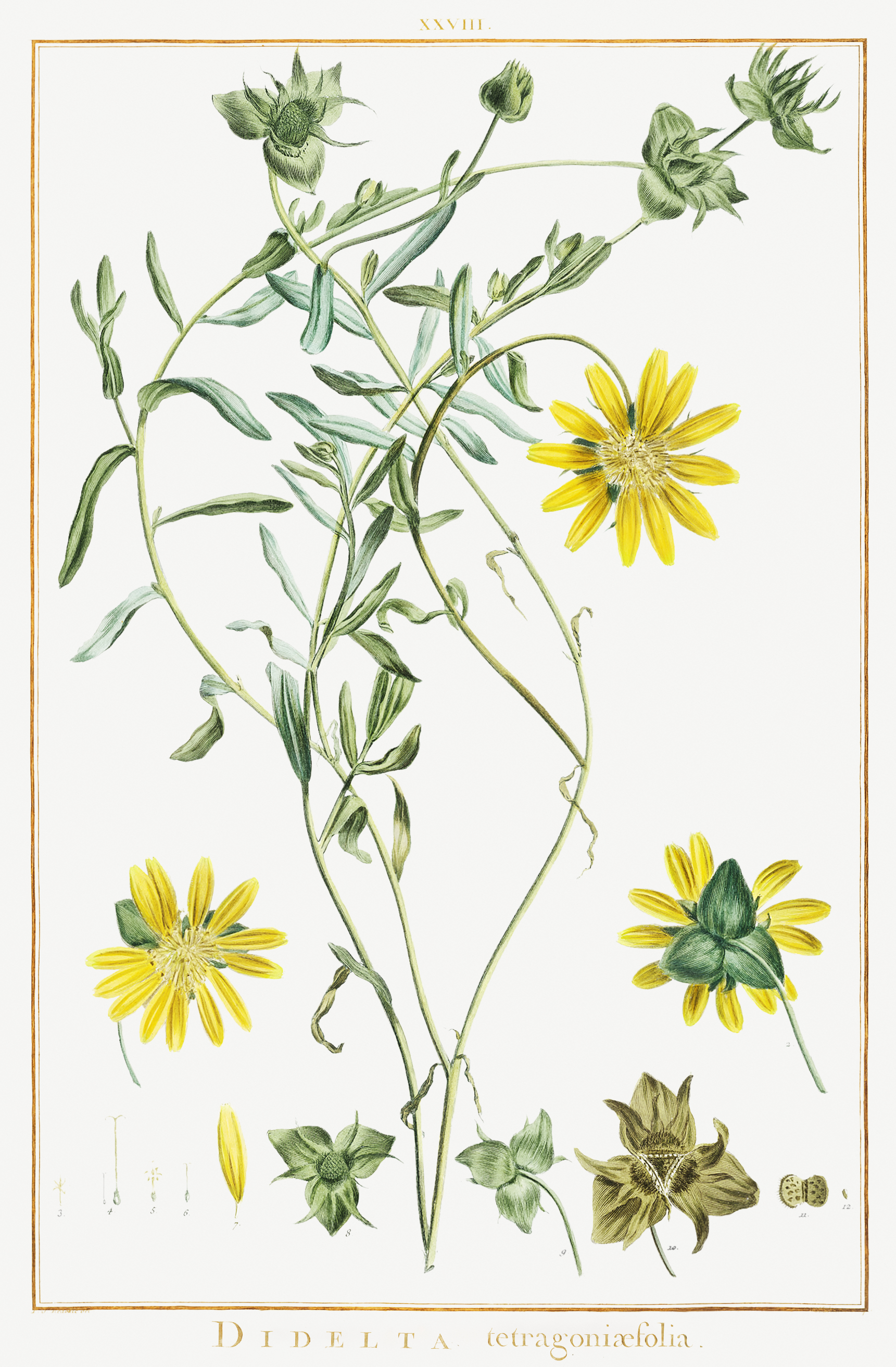
Type specimen of Didelta tetragoniaefolia, colored etching by Pierre-Joseph Redouté published in 1784

The first to describe species that are nowadays included in the genus Didelta was Carl Linnaeus the Younger in 1781 and he named them Polymnia carnosa and Polymnia spinosa. The type species of that genus is Polymnia canadensis, named by his father Carl Linnaeus in 1758. Polymnia is however a rather unrelated plant from North America in the Heliantheae-tribe, with which it shares broad outer involucral bracts. The French naturalist Pierre-Joseph Buc'hoz described in 1785 Breteuillia trianensis, based on a plant that was growing in the botanical garden at the Palace of Versailles. In 1786, Charles L'Héritier described Didelta tetragoniifolia, based on the same plant from Versailles. In his Hortus Kewensis published in 1789, the Scottish botanist William Aiton reassigned P. carnosa and P. spinosa to Carl Peter Thunberg's genus Choristea. Joseph Gaertner created in 1791 the new genus Favonia for P. spinosa. Friedrich Wilhelm Klatt redescribed Polymnia carnosa in 1886 and named it Distegia acida. These generic names have been regarded as synonyms by most later botanists. Although Breteuillia is an earlier and validly described name, it was ignored by later botanist, and therefore it was suppressed in favour of Didelta.

Species

- Didelta carnosa (L.f.) Aiton - Cape Province, Namibia
- Didelta spinosa (L.f.) Aiton - Cape Province, Namibia

=== Phylogeny ===
Based on DNA-analysis, Didelta belongs to the subtribe Gorteriinae. This analysis suggests that Didelta is most related to Berkheya spinosissima, with which it shares the dimorph involucral bracts. According to this study, the relationships within the Gorteriinae are as expressed in the following tree.

- subtribe Gorteriinae
  - Gazania, Hirpicium, Gorteria
  - - - "Berkheya spinosissima"
      - - Didelta carnosa
        - Didelta spinosa
    - - Cuspidia
      - - part of Berkheya including B. rigida, B. pinnatifida, B. eriobasis, B. annecteus, B. onobromoides, B. cardopatifolia
        - - Heterorhachis
          - part of Berkheya including B. echinacea, B. rapontica, B. subulata, B. bipinnatifida, B. angolensis
          - - part of Berkheya including B. spinosa, B. fruticosa, B. canescens
            - Cullumia and Berkheya cruciata

=== Reassigned species ===
The species that were originally described as, or moved to Didelta, which since have been reassigned include the following:

- Didelta cernua = Cuspidia cernua
- Didelta annua = Cuspidia cernua

== Distribution ==
The species of the genus Didelta occur in southern Namibia and the western parts of the Northern and Western Cape provinces of South Africa.
