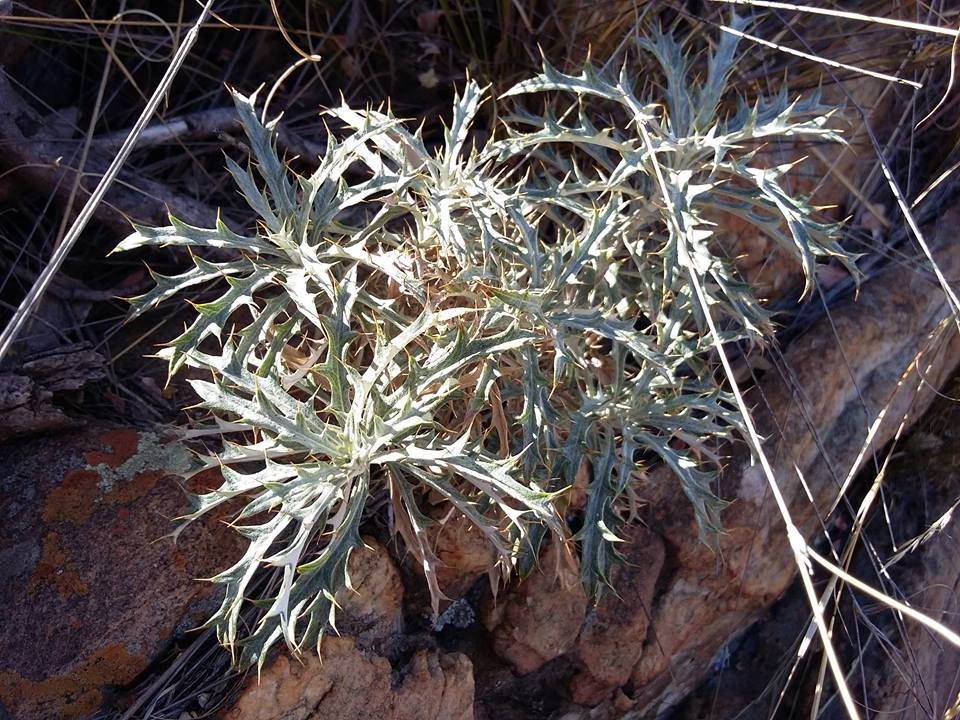

Scientific classification
- Kingdom: Plantae
- Clade: Tracheophytes
- Clade: Angiosperms
- Clade: Eudicots
- Clade: Asterids
- Order: Asterales
- Family: Asteraceae
- Genus: Berkheya
- Species: B. carlinopsis

Binomial name
- Berkheya carlinopsis Welw. ex O.Hoffm.

Synonyms
- Crocodilodes carlinopsis (Welw. ex O.Hoffm.) Hiern

= Berkheya carlinopsis =

Species of flowering plant

Berkheya carlinopsis Welw. ex O.Hoffm. is a Southern African herb or subshrub belonging to the family Asteraceae and was first described in 1896 in Boletim da Sociedade Broteriana 13 34.

A perennial herb or subshrub up to c. 1.5 m. tall. Stems branched, whitish araneose-tomentose, or glabrescent, leafy. Leaves sessile, 3–6 cm. long, dentate to pinnatifid-dentate; lamina (excluding the teeth or lobes) 2–3(4) mm. wide and linear or 5–15 mm. wide and lanceolate; teeth 3–8 on each side, each tooth 2–6(10) mm. long, triangular or linear and extended in a tawny spine 2–3 mm. long; margins of teeth and sinuses entire or armed with smaller spines; upper surface smooth or somewhat scabrous, slightly to densely araneose-tomentose or glabrescent; lower surface whitish felted-tomentose. Capitula radiate, solitary and terminal on the branches, or subcorymbosely arranged, 2.5–5(+?) cm. in diam. including the rays. Phyllaries spreading, felted-tomentose outside, subglabrous or glabrous inside, 10–20 x 1–3 mm., linear-lanceolate, spiny-acuminate, ciliate-spinescent on the margins with spines 1–3 mm. long; the outermost phyllaries ± leaf-like with small spine-tipped teeth; inner phyllaries smaller and less spinescent-ciliate. Margins of the receptacular alveoli extended into straw-coloured bristles 1–2 mm. long. Achenes 1.5–3.5 mm. long, turbinate, 8–10-ribbed, strigose-sericeous, glandular-viscid at the apex. Pappus scales 2-seriate, 1–1.5 mm. long, narrowly oblong, acute or subobtuse, denticulate towards the apex.

— Flora Zambesiaca

The genus Berkheya was describe by the German botanist Jakob Friedrich Ehrhart in 1788 and was in honour of Dutch botanist, Johannes le Francq van Berkhey (1729–1812) - 'carlinopsis' alludes to Carlina, a genus closely resembling Berkheya.
