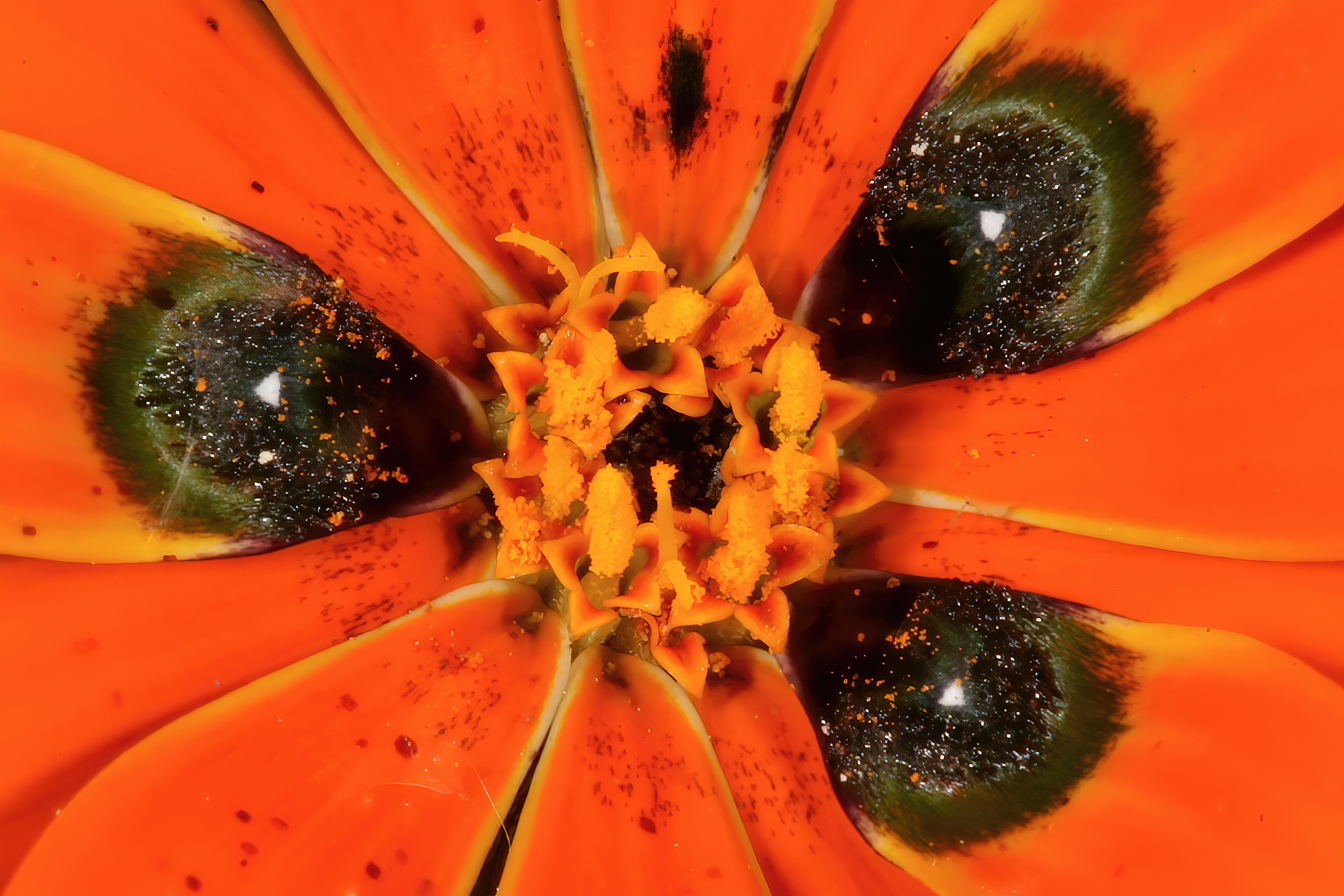

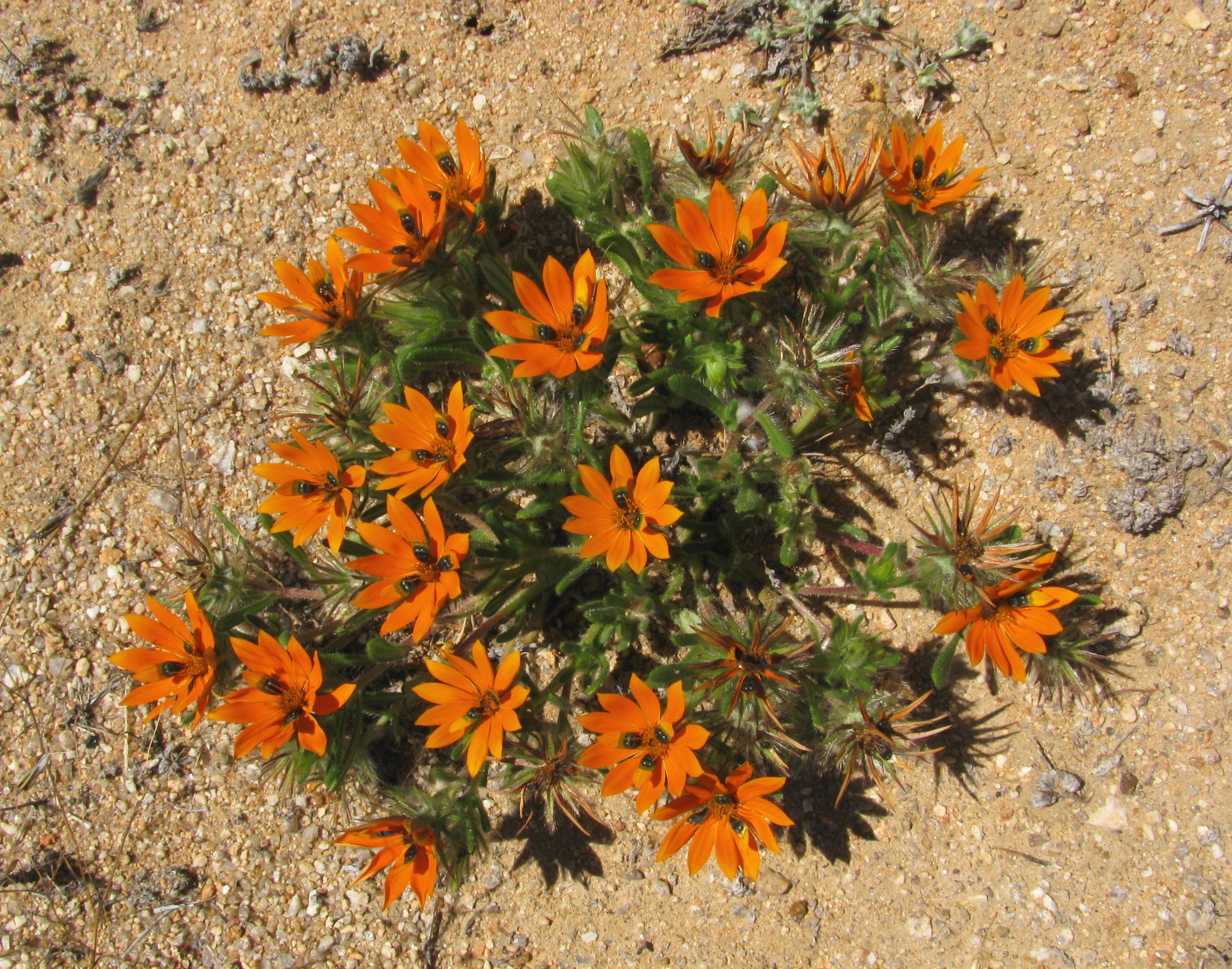

Scientific classification
- Kingdom: Plantae
- Clade: Tracheophytes
- Clade: Angiosperms
- Clade: Eudicots
- Clade: Asterids
- Order: Asterales
- Family: Asteraceae
- Genus: Gorteria
- Species: G. diffusa

Binomial name
- Gorteria diffusa Thunb. 1798

Synonyms
- Gazania diffusa; Chrysostemma calendula, Gorteria calendula, G. diffusa subsp. calendula; G. affinis, G. diffusa subsp. intermedia

= Gorteria diffusa =

Annual plant in the daisy family from South Africa

Gorteria diffusa is a highly variable, small annual herbaceous plant or rarely a shrublet that is assigned to the daisy family (Compositae or Asteraceae). Like in almost all Asteraceae, the individual flowers are 5-merous, small and clustered in typical heads, and are surrounded by an involucre, consisting of in this case several whorls of bracts, which are merged at their base. In G. diffusa, the centre of the head is taken by relatively few male and bisexual yellow to orange disc florets, and is surrounded by one complete whorl of 5–14 infertile cream to dark orange ray florets, sometimes with a few ray florets nearer to the centre. None, some or all of them may have darker spots at their base. The fruits remain attached to their common base when ripe, and it is the entire head that breaks free from the plant. One or few seeds germinate inside the flower head which can be found at the foot of plants during their first year. The species flowers between August and October. It is called beetle daisy in English and katoog (cat eye) in Afrikaans. It can be found in Namibia and South Africa.

== Description ==
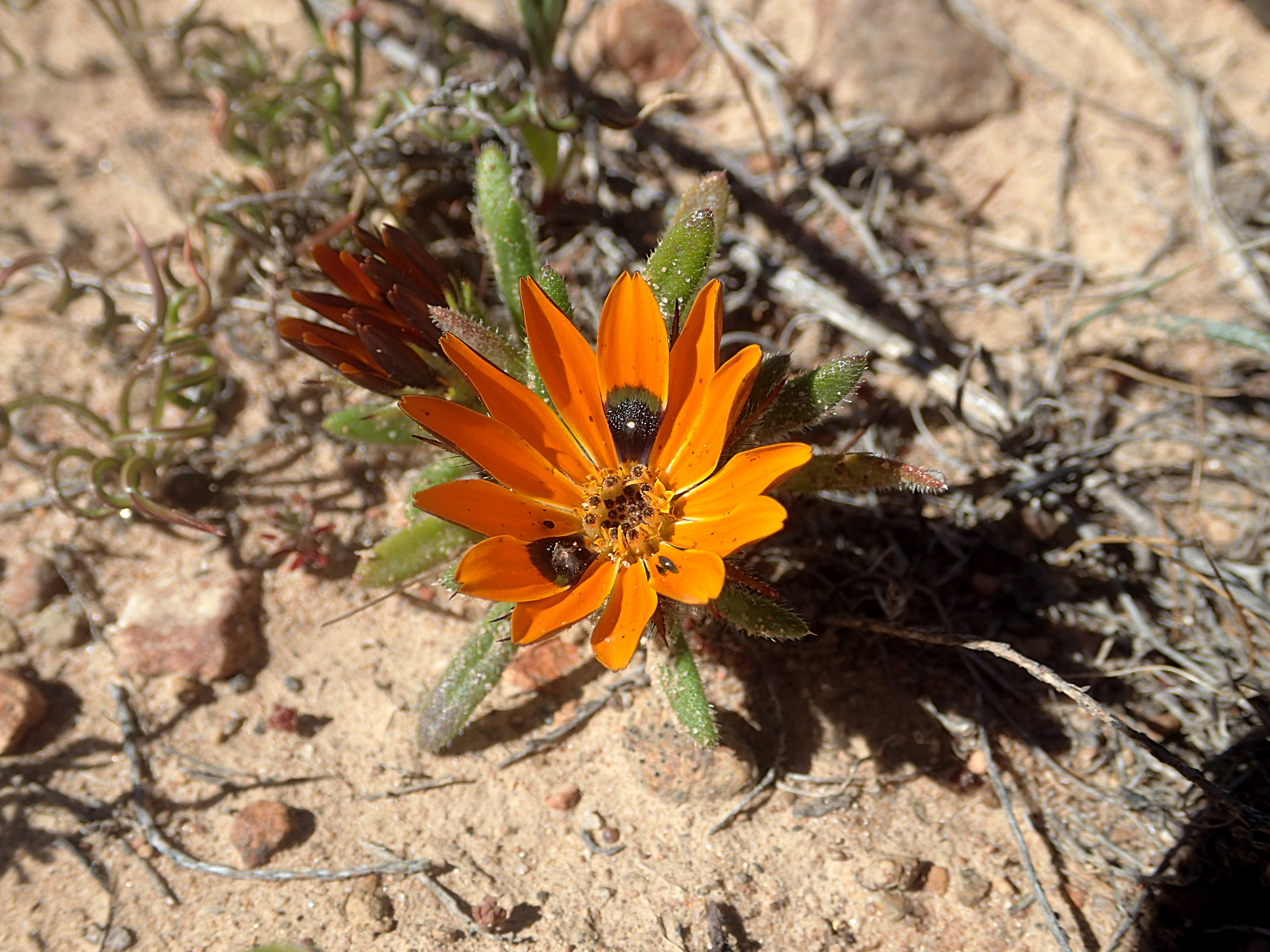
Form from Nieuwoudtville, showing the fly mimicry

Gorteria diffusa is initially erect, but quickly develops into a creeping annual of 2–20 cm (0.79–7.87 in) high that may sometimes survive and change into a shrublet. It is very variable in the number, shape, color and spots of the ray florets, and fourteen discrete forms have been distinguished. Its stems are branching at the base and often also more towards the end of the stems. They are reddish or green in color, and are set with long stiff hairs. The leaves near the base are 2½–9 cm (1–3½ in) long and 2–10 mm (0.079–0.394 in) wide. The leaves on the stems become gradually smaller further toward the tip, and may be ½–5 cm (0.2–2 in) long and 1–10 mm (0.04-0.4 in) wide. They are widest below midlength, mostly entire, but sometimes pinnately incised, with many stiff hairs on the upper surface, and the margins curled downward.

The flower heads are at least 2 cm (0.8 in), but mostly 3–5½ cm (1.2–2.2 in) across. The eighteen to thirty-two green or reddish bracts have red or blackish tips and together compose a pitcher-shaped involucre, which later becomes more inflated and woody. The free tips of the involucral bracts cover at least the upper two-third, are initially more or less upright but bend out later. This involucre encloses one complete, and sometimes a second incomplete whorl of somewhat overlapping infertile ray florets, in some forms seven to nine, in other forms twelve to fourteen, which may range in base color from almost white, through yellow to orange, with the underside ranging from grayish to dark orange-brown. These may have a darker zone at the base that may be clear yellow or orange-brown. There may also be yellow marking on all ray florets or dark blotches on some or all of them. Ray florets with blotches may be relatively small and brighter colored compared to those without or have the same size and color. These egg-shaped, oval or narrowly oval ray florets reach at least as far out as or more often much further than the involucral bracts, are 10–23 mm (0.39–0.91 in) long and 2–6 mm (0.079–0.236 in) wide, have an pointy or blunt tip with mostly four teeth. The dark blotches are raised or flat, dark green, brown or purple with black, with one to four small white spots, with stripes and sometimes hairy away from the base. Within the whorls of ray florets are thirty to forty yellow or orange disc florets, each star-like with five lobes, the outer circle bisexual, those at the center functionally male. The disc florets have hairs on the outside, sometimes more near the top and few or many very short glandular hairs. The style has two branches, less so in the male florets in the center of the disc.

The one-seeded, indehiscent fruits (called cypselas) are about 4 mm (0.16 in) long and have an asymmetrical pear shape, flatter facing the center of the flower head, the surface hairless near its foot, but felty hairy near its tip, and without ribs, sometimes with globe-shaped glands and twisted twin hairs. The pappus is absent or consists of a minute fringe.

=== Differences with other Gorteria species ===
Forms of G. diffusa with thirteen ray florets per head (which always have dark spots) differ from G. corymbosa, G. personata, G. parviligulata (all with eight ray florets per head), and G. piloselloides (with either five or eight ray florets), and differ from G. alienata, G. integrifolia and G. warmbadica (all without spots). The form of G. diffusa with eight florets per head (which is consistently found only in the Richtersveld, and has 18–31 narrowly triangular involucral bracts) differs from G. alienata, G. integrifolia and G. warmbadica (all with thirteen ray florets), from G. parviligulata and G. personata (ray florets not reaching beyond the tips of the involucral bracts), from G. corymbosa (has bristle-like involucral bracts), and G. piloselloides (has five ray florets with 15–20 involucral bracts, or eight ray florets with 35–45 bracts).

== Taxonomy ==
Gorteria diffusa was described in 1798 by Carl Peter Thunberg, a Swedish naturalist who is sometimes referred to as "the father of South African botany". German botanist Kurt Polycarp Joachim Sprengel reassigned the species in 1826, creating the new combination Gazania diffusa. The famous Swiss botanist Augustin Pyramus de Candolle described in 1838 Gorteria affinis, which was in 1865 demoted by William Henry Harvey to Gorteria diffusa var. intermedia. De Candolle in 1838 also described Gorteria calendulacea, which was demoted by H. Roessler in 1959 to a variety of G. diffusa, to be raised to subspecies by him in 1973. Ernst Heinrich Friedrich Meyer described Chrysostemma calendulacea in 1838 in the same book as De Candole. A DNA comparison executed by Frida Stångberg and Arne Anderberg showed that populations from the south that had previously been included in G. diffusa belong to the same taxon as Gorteria personata subsp. gracilis, and have been assigned by them to Gorteria piloseloides, an existing available synonym. They also concluded that G. diffusa subsp. parviligulata represents a species somewhat distanced from the typical G. diffusa, and assigned it to the new combination Gorteria parviligulata. Finally they established that two different groups of G. diffusa subsp. calendulacea clustered with more typical G. diffusa from central and northern areas respectively, and confirm these forms should be assigned to G. diffusa.

== Distribution ==
The species is endemic to an area between the Orange River on the border with Namibia in the north to Clanwilliam, Western Cape in the south. This area has cool rainy winters and dry hot summers.

== Ecology ==
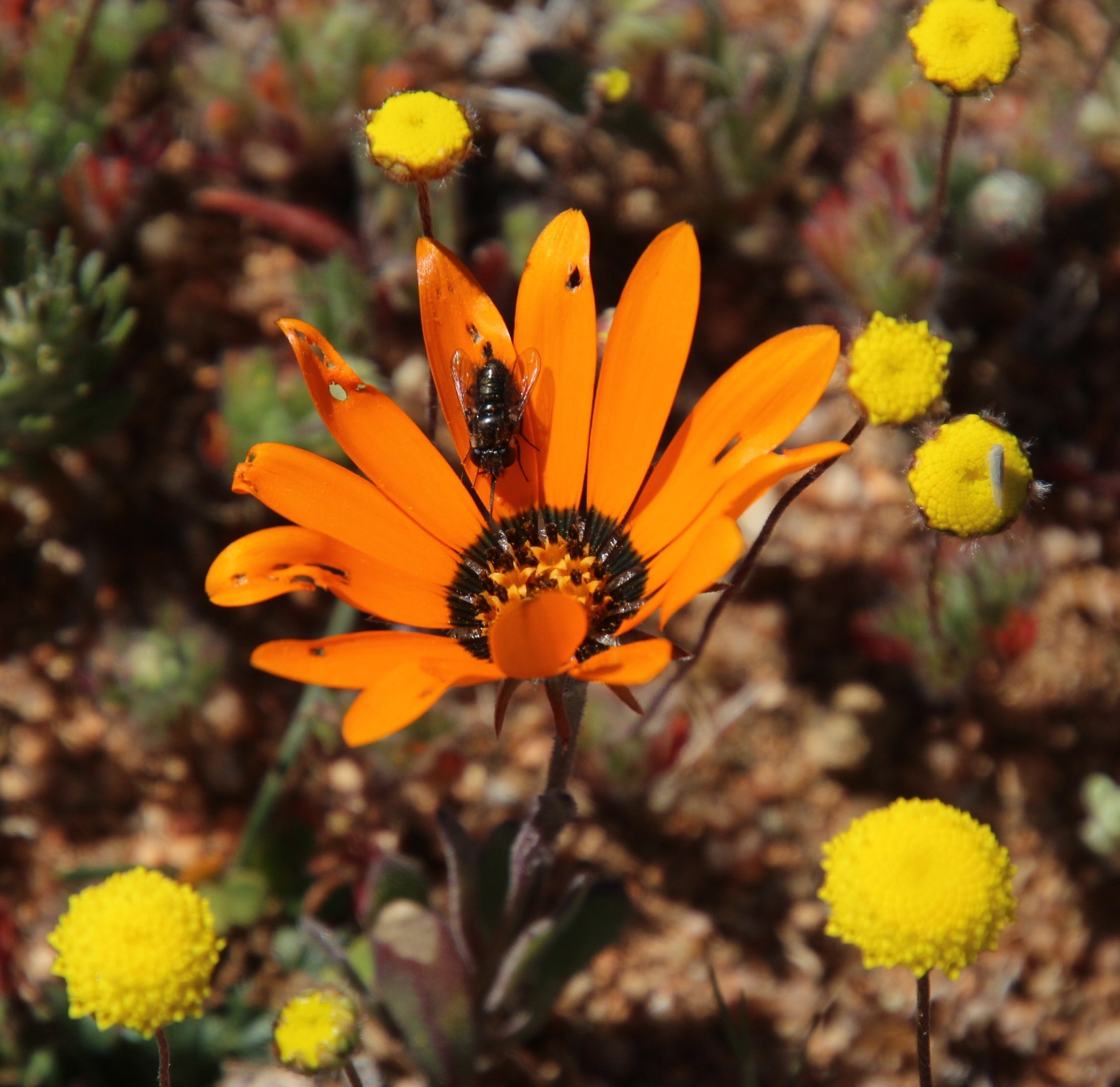
Megapalpus capensis visiting a flowerhead

The flower heads of Gorteria diffusa are visited by several insect species which are not choosy, such as honey bees and monkey beetles, but also by a specialist species of bee fly Megapalpus capensis (synonym M. nitidus). The raised spots that can often be found on few or all of the ray florets, are strongly reminiscent of the fly's body. The absence of the spots results in fewer visits by Megapalpus males, but this does not impact on the setting of the seed. The flies are not attracted to simple black spots. Scientists conclude that the spots are an example of mimicry of the pollinator, that result in more visits by male specimens of the pollinator that are deceived into thinking the spots are females; G. diffusa is not unique in doing this, but it is a phenomenon largely restricted to orchids. Like the other species of Gorteria, the cypselas do not part from the flower head when ripe, but initially mostly only one germinates while remaining in the flower head. In G. diffusa, it has been observed that the other cypselas germinate in later years, thus making it possible to bridge periods of drought, when seed setting may not succeed.
