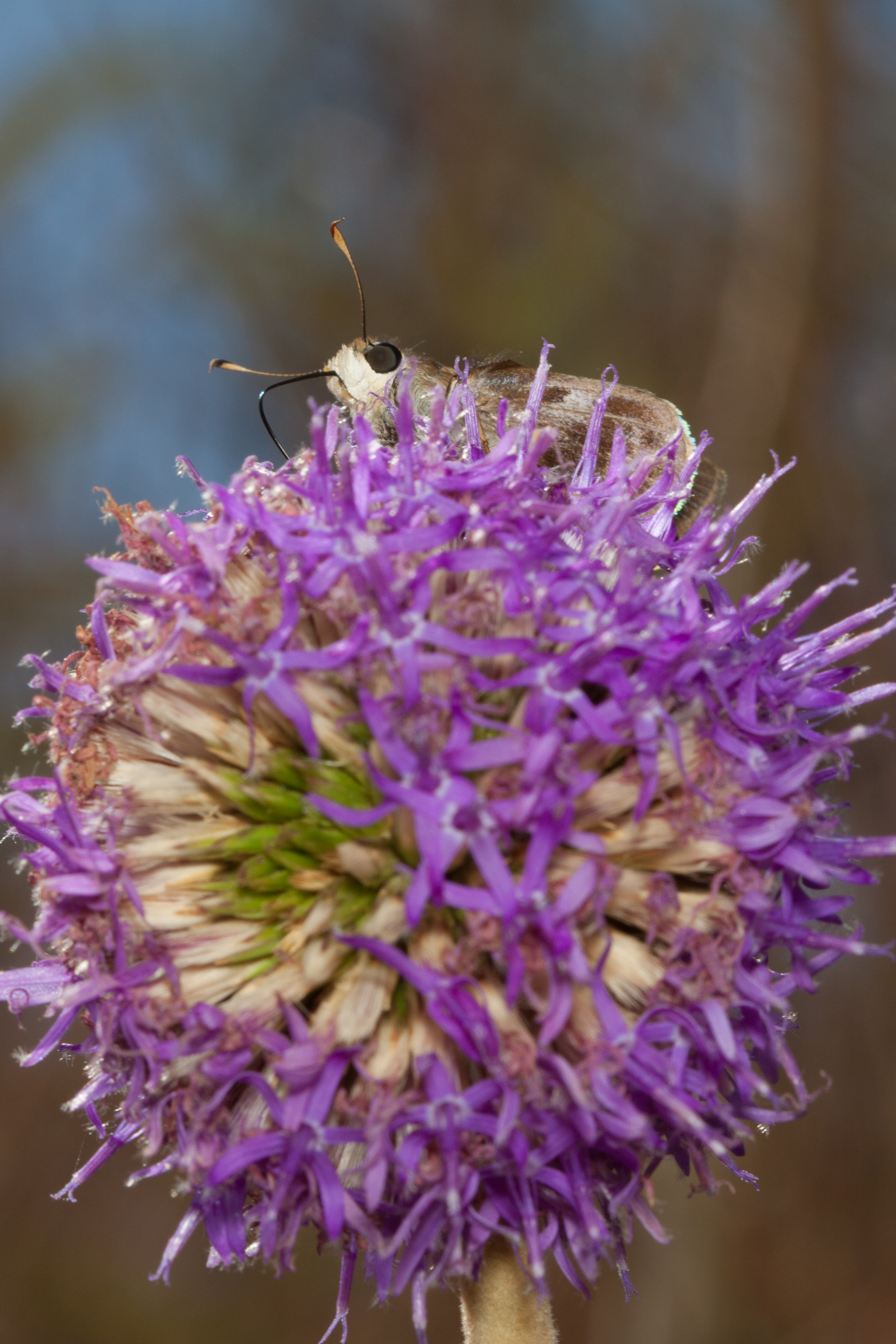
- Chresta sphaerocephala

Scientific classification
- Kingdom: Plantae
- Clade: Embryophytes
- Clade: Tracheophytes
- Clade: Spermatophytes
- Clade: Angiosperms
- Clade: Eudicots
- Clade: Asterids
- Order: Asterales
- Family: Asteraceae
- Subfamily: Vernonioideae
- Tribe: Vernonieae
- Genus: Chresta; Vell. ex DC.

Type species
- Chresta sphaerocephala DC.

Synonyms
- Eremanthus sect. Pycnocephalum (Less.) Baker; Argyrovernonia MacLeish; Glaziovianthus G.M.Barroso; Chresta Vell.; Vernonia sect. Pycnocephalum Less.; Chresta sect. Euchresta Gardner; Eremanthus sect. Chresta (DC.) Baker; Stachyanthus DC.

= Chresta =

Genus of flowering plants

Chresta is a genus of South American flowering plants in the family Asteraceae.

== Species ==
As of May 2023, Plants of the World Online accepted the following species:

- Chresta angustifolia Gardner
- Chresta artemisiifolia Siniscalchi & Loeuille
- Chresta curumbensis (Philipson) H.Rob.
- Chresta exsucca DC.
- Chresta filicifolia Siniscalchi & Loeuille
- Chresta harleyi H.Rob.
- Chresta hatschbachii H.Rob.
- Chresta heteropappa Siniscalchi & Loeuille
- Chresta martii (DC.) H.Rob.
- Chresta pacourinoides (Mart. ex DC.) Siniscalchi & Loeuille
- Chresta pinnatifida (Philipson) H.Rob.
- Chresta plantaginifolia Gardner
- Chresta pycnocephala DC.
- Chresta scapigera (Less.) Gardner
- Chresta souzae H.Rob.
- Chresta speciosa Gardner
- Chresta sphaerocephala DC.
- Chresta subverticillata Siniscalchi & Loeuille
