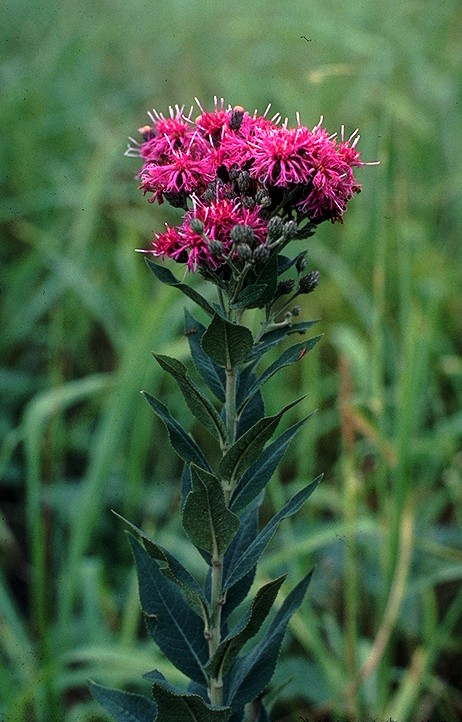
- Vernonia baldwinii

Scientific classification
- Kingdom: Plantae
- Clade: Tracheophytes
- Clade: Angiosperms
- Clade: Eudicots
- Clade: Asterids
- Order: Asterales
- Family: Asteraceae
- Subfamily: Vernonioideae; Lindl. (1829)

Tribes
- Eremothamneae H.Rob. & Brettell; Platycarpheae V.A.Funk & H.Rob.; Arctotideae Cass.; Arctotideae-G subtribe (possible new tribe Gorterieae); Liabeae Rydb.; Distephaneae (S.C.Keeley & H.Rob.) H.Rob. & V.A.Funk; Moquinieae H.Rob; Vernonieae Cass.

= Vernonioideae =

Subfamily of flowering plants

Vernonioideae is a subfamily of the sunflower family, Asteraceae. It includes seven or more tribes, some of which contain subtribes.

== Tribes, subtribes, and genera ==
Per Susanna et al., except as otherwise noted.

- Eremothamneae H.Rob. & Brettell
- Platycarpheae V.A.Funk & H.Rob.
- Arctotideae Cass.
  - Arctotidinae Dumort.
  - Heterolepis Cass. incertae sedis
- Arctotideae-G subtribe (possible new tribe Gorterieae)
  - Gorteriinae Benth.
    - Berkheya Ehrh.
    - Berkheyopsis O.Hoffm.
    - Cullumia R.Br.
    - Cuspidia Gaertn.
    - Didelta L'Hér.
    - Gazania Gaertn.
    - Gorteria L. (syn. Hirpicium Cass.)
    - Heterorhachis Sch.Bip. ex Walp.
    - Roessleria Stångb. & Anderb.
- Liabeae Rydb.
  - Liabinae Cass.
  - Munnoziinae H.Rob.
  - Paranepheliinae H.Rob.
  - Sinclairiinae H.Rob.
- Distephaneae (S.C.Keeley & H.Rob.) H.Rob. & V.A.Funk
    - Distephanus Cass.
- Moquinieae H.Rob
- Vernonieae Cass.
  - Centrapalinae H.Rob.
  - Centratherinae H.Rob., R.M.King & F.Bohlmann
  - Chrestinae H.Rob.
  - Dipterocypselinae S.C.Keeley & H.Rob.
  - Elephantopinae Less.
  - Erlangeinae H.Rob.
  - Gymnantheminae H.Rob.
  - Hesperomanniinae S.C.Keeley & H.Rob.
  - Leiboldiinae H.Rob.
  - Lepidaploinae S.C.Keeley & H.Rob.
  - Linziinae S.C.Keeley & H.Rob.
  - Lychnophorinae Benth.
  - Mesanthophorinae S.C.Keeley & H.Rob.
  - Pacourininae H.Rob.
  - Piptocarphinae H.Rob., R.M.King & F.Bohlmann
  - Rolandrinae Cass. ex Dumort.
  - Sipolisiinae H.Rob.
  - Stokesiinae H.Rob.
  - Trichospirinae Less.
  - Vernoniinae Cass. ex Dumort.
