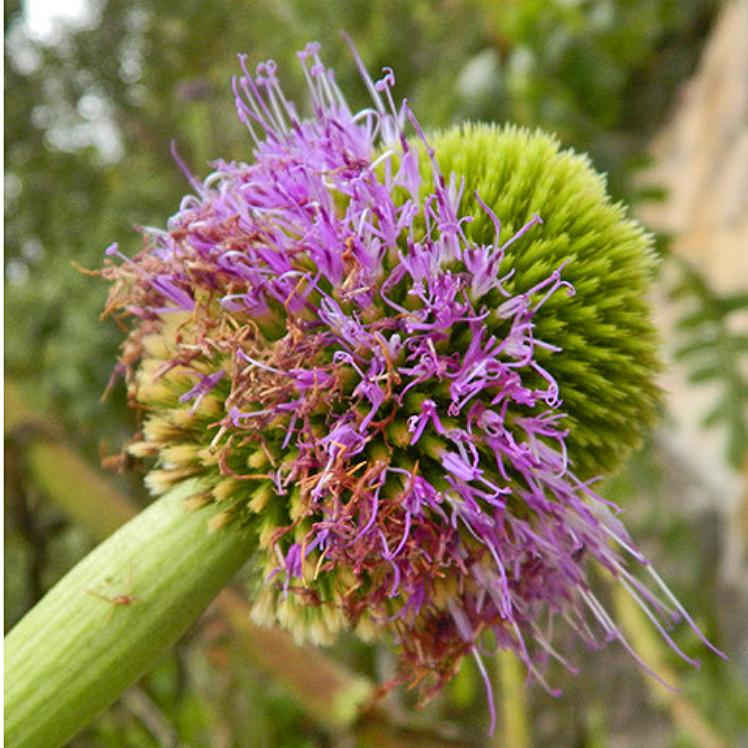

Scientific classification
- Kingdom: Plantae
- Clade: Tracheophytes
- Clade: Angiosperms
- Clade: Eudicots
- Clade: Asterids
- Order: Asterales
- Family: Asteraceae
- Genus: Chresta
- Species: C. pacourinoides

Binomial name
- Chresta pacourinoides (Mart. ex DC.) Siniscalchi & Loeuille

Synonyms
- Chresta amplexifolia Dematt., Roque & Miranda Gonç.; Pithecoseris pacourinoides Mart. ex DC.

= Chresta pacourinoides =

Species of flowering plant

Chresta pacourinoides is a species of flowering plants in the family Asteraceae. It was first described as Pithecoseris pacourinoides by A. P. de Candolle in 1836 with the name ascribed to Carl von Martius. Under this name, it was the only species in the genus Pithecoseris. Chresta pacourinoides is native to northeastern Brazil.
