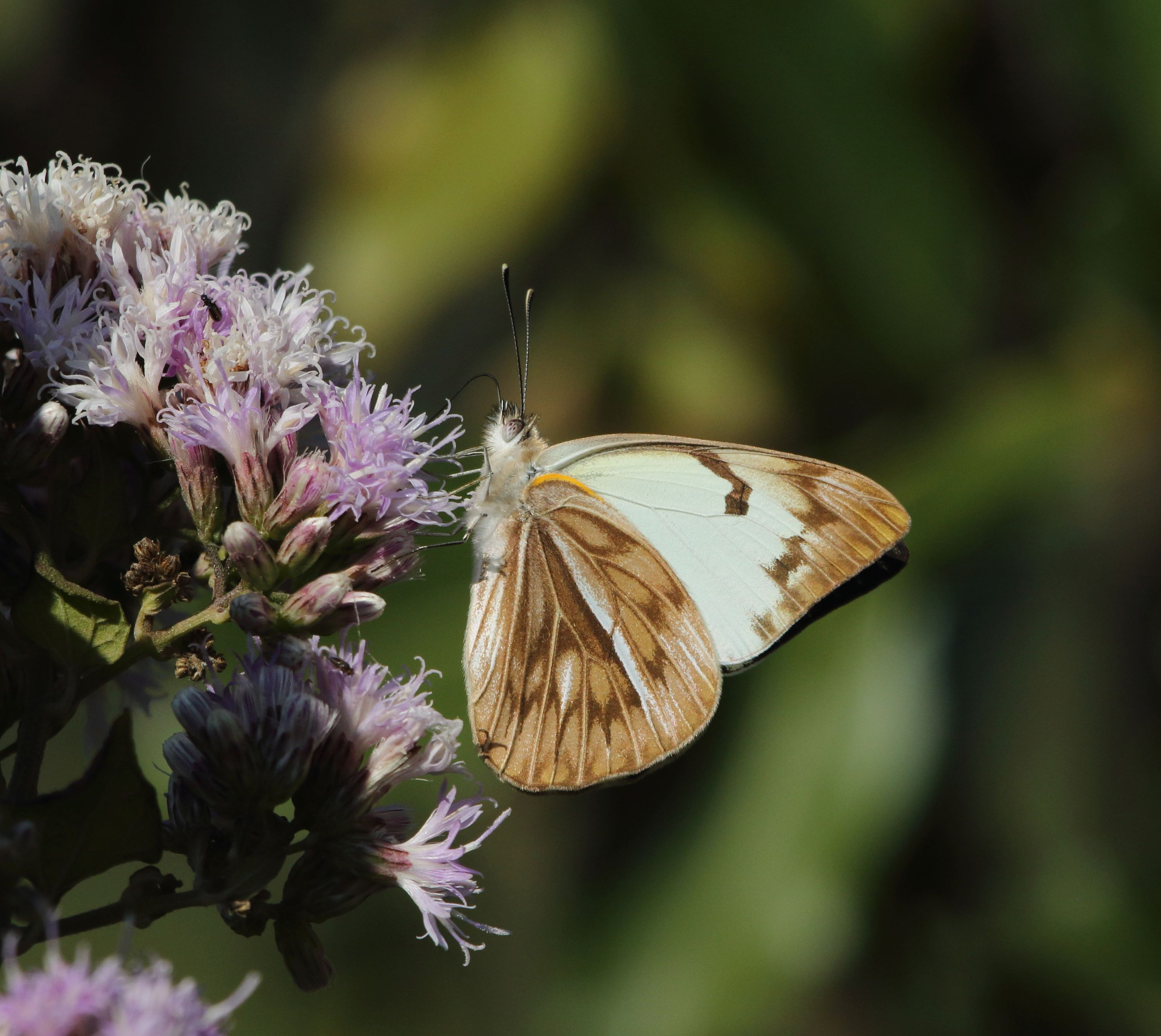
- D. angulifolius flowers being pollinated by the African veined white butterfly

Scientific classification
- Kingdom: Plantae
- Clade: Embryophytes
- Clade: Tracheophytes
- Clade: Spermatophytes
- Clade: Angiosperms
- Clade: Eudicots
- Clade: Asterids
- Order: Asterales
- Family: Asteraceae
- Subfamily: Vernonioideae
- Tribe: Distephaneae (S.C.Keeley & H.Rob.) H.Rob. & V.A.Funk (2024)
- Genus: Distephanus; Cass. (1819)

Type species
- Distephanus populifolius (Lam.) Cass.

Synonyms
- Antunesia O.Hoffm. (1893); Gongrothamnus Steetz (1864); Newtonia O.Hoffm. (1892), nom. illeg.

= Distephanus =

Genus of flowering plants

Distephanus is a genus of flowering plants in the family Asteraceae. It is described by American botanist Harold E. Robinson as having over 40 species and by David Mabberley as having only 34 species. These sources differ sharply in their description of the range of the genus. Robinson has it ranging throughout Africa and occurring also in India and China. Mabberley has it restricted to southeast Africa, Madagascar, and Mauritius. Plants of the World Online accepts 44 species native to sub-Saharan Africa, Madagascar, and south-central China.

The genus Distephanus consists of trees, shrubs, and vines. The leaves are often trinervate. The flowers are in terminal inflorescences and are usually yellow. The anthers have an appendage called a tail. The base of the style is enlarged.

The name Distephanus is derived from Greek and means "two crowns", a reference to the two whorls of bristles that form the pappus.

The genus Distephanus was established by Alexandre de Cassini in 1817. Cassini described the type species, Distephanus populifolia in 1819. This species had originally been named Conyza populifolia by Jean-Baptiste Lamarck in 1786.

Distephanus has usually been placed in the tribe Vernonieae, but the results of some molecular phylogenetic studies of DNA sequences have cast doubt upon this placement. In one classification of Asteraceae, it was placed in a tritomy consisting of Distephanus, Moquinieae, and Vernonieae. In 2024 Gostel et al. concluded that the genus belonged in its own tribe, Distephaneae.

Distephanus differs from (other) genera in Vernonieae in having yellow flowers as well as in other characters that are less obvious.

== Species ==
44 species are accepted.

- Distephanus ambongensis (Humbert) H.Rob.
- Distephanus angolensis (O.Hoffm.) H.Rob. & B.Kahn
- Distephanus angulifolius (DC.) H.Rob. & B.Kahn
- Distephanus anisochaetoides (Sond.) H.Rob. & B.Kahn
- Distephanus antandroy (Humbert) H.Rob. & B.Kahn
- Distephanus bakeri (Vatke) V.A.Funk & H.Rob.
- Distephanus bara (Humbert) H.Rob.
- Distephanus biafrae (Oliv. & Hiern) H.Rob.
- Distephanus capitatus Bojer ex DC.
- Distephanus capuronii (Humbert) V.A.Funk & H.Rob.
- Distephanus cloiselii (Moore) H.Rob. & B.Kahn
- Distephanus divaricatus (Steetz) H.Rob. & B.Kahn
- Distephanus eriophyllus (Drake) H.Rob. & B.Kahn
- Distephanus forrestii (Anthony) H.Rob. & B.Kahn
- Distephanus garnierianus (Klatt) H.Rob. & B.Kahn
- Distephanus glandulicinctus (Humbert) H.Rob. & B.Kahn
- Distephanus glutinosus (DC.) H.Rob. & B.Kahn
- Distephanus grevei (Drake) V.A.Funk & H.Rob.
- Distephanus henryi (Dunn) H.Rob.
- Distephanus ibityensis (Humbert) V.A.Funk & H.Rob.
- Distephanus inhacensis (G.V.Pope) R.G.C.Boon & Glen
- Distephanus lastellei (Drake) H.Rob. & B.Kahn
- Distephanus madagascariensis (Less.) H. Rob. & V.A. Funk
- Distephanus mahafaly (Humbert) H.Rob. & B.Kahn
- Distephanus majungensis (Humbert) H.Rob. & B.Kahn
- Distephanus malacophytus (Baker) H.Rob. & B.Kahn
- Distephanus manambolensis (Humbert) H.Rob. & B.Kahn
- Distephanus mangokensis (Humbert) H.Rob. & B.Kahn
- Distephanus nummulariifolius (Klatt) H.Rob. & B.Kahn
- Distephanus ochroleucus (Baker) H.Rob. & B.Kahn
- Distephanus plumosus (O.Hoffm.) Mesfin
- Distephanus poissonii (Humbert) V.A.Funk & H.Rob.
- Distephanus polygalifolius (Less.) H.Rob. & B.Kahn
- Distephanus populifolius (Lam.) Cass.
- Distephanus qazmi N.Kilian & A.G.Mill.
- Distephanus quartziticola (Humbert) V.A.Funk & H.Rob.
- Distephanus rhodopappus (Baker) V.A.Funk & H.Rob.
- Distephanus rochonioides (Humbert) H.Rob. & B.Kahn
- Distephanus spiciformis (Klatt) V.A.Funk & H.Rob.
- Distephanus streptocladus (Baker) H.Rob. & B.Kahn
- Distephanus subluteus (Scott-Elliot) H.Rob. & B.Kahn
- Distephanus swinglei (Humbert) H.Rob. & B.Kahn
- Distephanus trinervis Bojer ex DC.
