= University of Harderwijk =

Public university in Harderwijk, Dutch Republic (now the Netherlands) from 1648-1811

Coordinates: 52°20′58″N 5°36′59″E

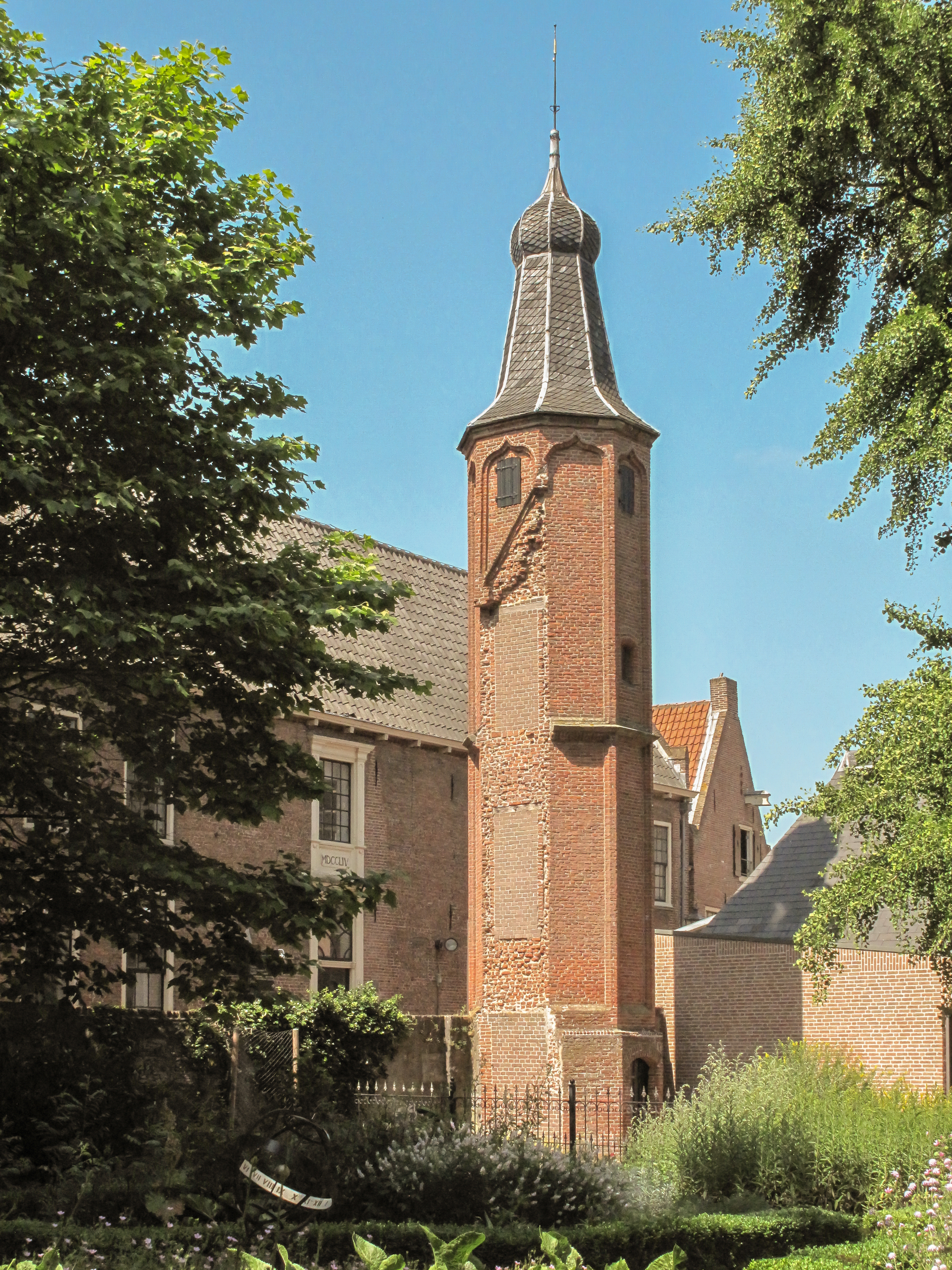
Harderwijk, tower: het Linnaeustorentje

The University of Harderwijk (1648–1811), also named the Guelders Academy (Latin: Academia Gelro-Zutphanica), was located in the city of Harderwijk, in the Republic of the United Provinces (now: the Netherlands). It was founded by the province of Guelders (Gelre).

== History ==
The university of Harderwijk was founded during the Dutch Republic by the States of Gelre at the end of the Eighty Years' War, in 1648. The universities of Leiden (1575), Franeker (1585), Groningen (1614) and Utrecht (1636) had already been founded earlier. Harderwijk was the fifth Dutch university. It was always to be small, with never more than sixty new students, and a maximum of 150 each year.

In the 18th century, the university of Harderwijk attracted students with its low fees. In the time of the 18th-century Swedish biologist, Carl Linnaeus, a doctorate could not be obtained in many other European countries. Graduates students would often go to the Dutch Republic, where the universities had good reputations. The wealthy usually travelled to Leiden; the less fortunate could go to Harderwijk, where the doctorate was less expensive, and could be attained much faster.

One of the professors of Harderwijk was David de Gorter, who was friends with Linnaeus. He was royal physician to Empress Elizabeth of Russia.

The university was closed in 1811 during the French occupation. Later, king William I tried to re-establish the university, without success.

== Modern culture ==
In the 1990s, the university became more known to a new audience thanks to the fictional character Prof. Fetze Alsvanouds ("Als vanouds" loosely translated as "like the good old days"), who was played by Aart Staartjes and regularly appeared in the humorous Dutch children's television program Het Klokhuis. Alsvanouds posed as a professor at the University of Harderwijk, and declaimed sundry false and often ridiculous 'scientific' explanations for common things in everyday life for children.

== Notable alumni ==
Some well-known graduates of the University of Harderwijk are

- Hungarian encyclopedist János Apáczai Csere (1651)
- artist Romeyn de Hooghe (1689)
- explorer Jacob Roggeveen (1690)
- physician and chemist Hieronymus David Gaubius
- physician Herman Boerhaave (1693)
- Swedish scientist Carl Linnaeus (1735)
- Hungarian linguist János Uri (1749)
- explorer Robert Jacob Gordon (1759)
- statesman Herman Willem Daendels (1783)
- engineer and general Cornelis Krayenhoff (1784)
- poet A.C.W. Staring (1787)
- English poet and metaphysical writer Frank Sayers (1789)

== See also ==
- List of early modern universities in Europe

== Publications ==
- Het Gelders Athene. Bijdragen tot de geschiedenis van de Gelderse Universiteit in Harderwijk (1648-1811). Hilversum, Verloren, 2000, ISBN 90-6550-092-8
- Een onderschatte universiteit. 350 jaar Gelderse Academie in Harderwijk. Red.: Liek Mulder en Willem Frijhoff. Harderwijk, Ver. Vrienden van het Veluws Museum, 1998, ISBN 90-803020-4-X
