= Distephanus qazmi =

Conservation status
- Least Concern (IUCN 3.1)

Scientific classification
- Kingdom: Plantae
- Clade: Tracheophytes
- Clade: Angiosperms
- Clade: Eudicots
- Clade: Asterids
- Order: Asterales
- Family: Asteraceae
- Genus: Distephanus
- Species: D. qazmi

Binomial name
- Distephanus qazmi N.Kilian & A.G.Mill.

Species of flowering plant

Distephanus qazmi is a species of flowering plant in the family Asteraceae. It is endemic to the island of Socotra in Yemen.
