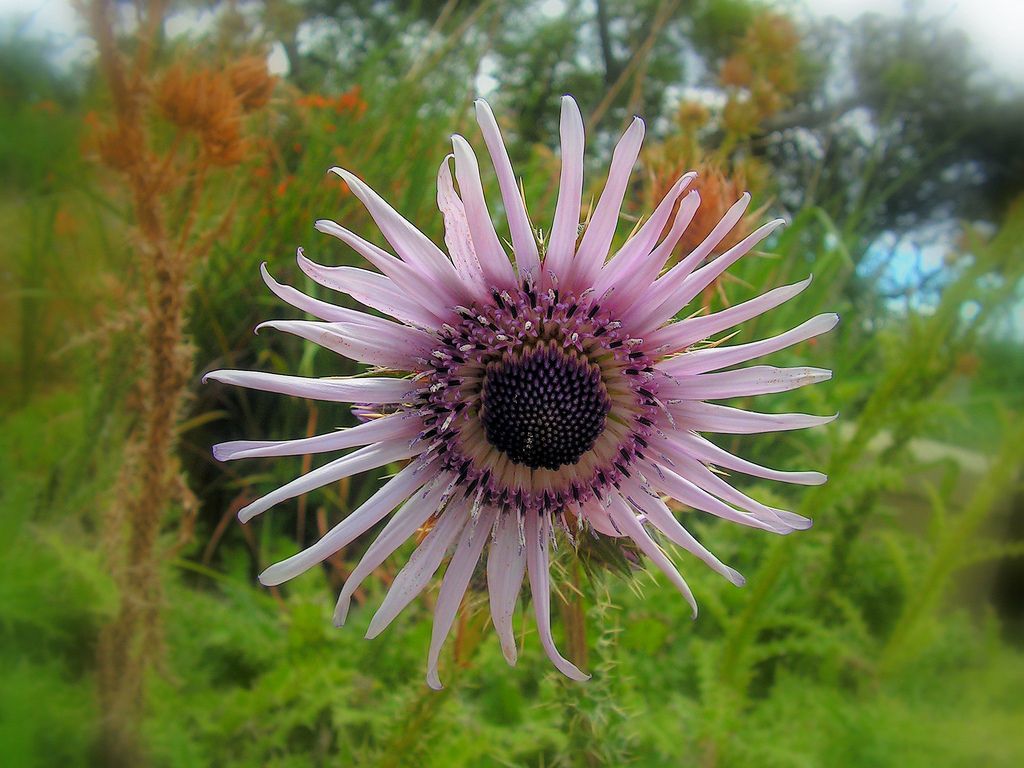

Scientific classification
- Kingdom: Plantae
- Clade: Tracheophytes
- Clade: Angiosperms
- Clade: Eudicots
- Clade: Asterids
- Order: Asterales
- Family: Asteraceae
- Genus: Berkheya
- Species: B. purpurea

Binomial name
- Berkheya purpurea (DC.) Mast.

= Berkheya purpurea =

Species of flowering plant

Berkheya purpurea (syn. Stobaea purpurea DC.), also known as purple berkheya, is a member of the daisy family (Asteraceae) of flowering plants. Like most members of its genus, Berkheya, it is native to southern Africa.

== Description ==
This herbaceous perennial grows to a height of 75 cm (30 in). It has a 90 cm (35 in) rosette of spiky leaves, each leaf being 45 cm (18 in) in length and 10 cm (3.9 in) broad. The leaves have a white felted underside. From the centre of each rosette grows a stem with 8 cm (3.1 in) successional flowers on side branches. The daisy-like composite blooms have white or pale mauve ray florets surrounding a central head of darker purple. It flowers in summer.

== Distribution ==
This plant is native to Lesotho and South Africa (in Eastern Cape, Free State, KwaZulu-Natal and Northern Cape).

== Cultivation ==
Berkheya purpurea is hardy to −10 °C (14 °F), but requires a sheltered position in full sun, with moist but well-drained soil.
