= David de Gorter =

Dutch physician and botanist (1717-1783)

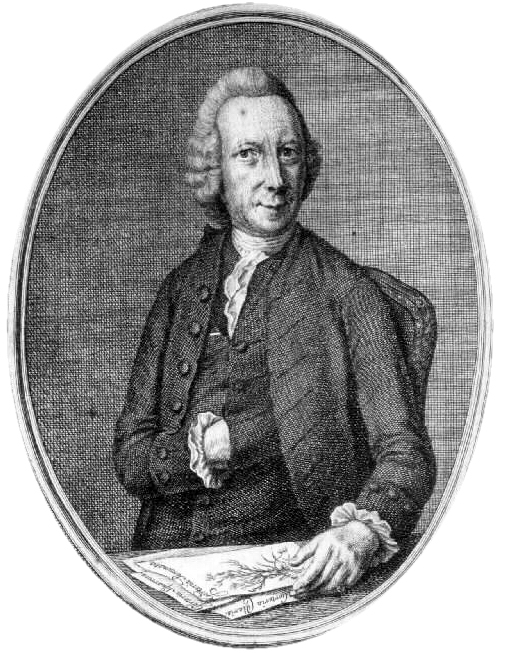
- David de Gorter
- Born: April 30, 1717; Enkhuizen, Dutch Republic
- Died: April 8, 1783 (aged 65); Zutphen, Dutch Republic
- Occupation: Botanist

David de Gorter (April 30, 1717 – April 8, 1783) was a Dutch physician and botanist.

De Gorter was a professor at the University of Harderwijk and royal physician to Empress Elizabeth of Russia. He was a member of the Imperial Academy of Sciences in St Petersburg, the Royal Swedish Academy of Sciences and other academies and learned societies.

At Harderwijk, De Gorter made friends with the young Carl Linnaeus, who came there to obtain his doctorate degree. Later, Linnaeus named the plant genus Gorteria after David de Gorter and his father, the physician Johannes de Gorter. In St Petersburg, de Gorter edited and published Stepan Krasheninnikov's last work, Flora Ingrica. He authored one of the first floras to use binomial nomenclature, Flora Belgica from 1767.

On May 21, 1775 De Gorter married Mary Elizabeth Schultz, a friend of Betje Wolff. After his death, she donated his herbarium to the Academy in Harderwijk. It now is kept at the National Herbarium of the Netherlands.

De Gorter spent his last years in Zutphen, where he wrote his Flora of the Seven Provinces.

The Dutch botanical journal Gorteria is named in his honour.
