= Berkheyopsis =

Scientific classification
- Kingdom: Plantae
- Clade: Tracheophytes
- Clade: Angiosperms
- Clade: Eudicots
- Clade: Asterids
- Order: Asterales
- Family: Asteraceae
- Subfamily: Vernonioideae
- Tribe: Arctotideae
- Subtribe: Gorteriinae
- Genus: Berkheyopsis; O.Hoffm. (1892)
- Species: B. echinus

Binomial name
- Berkheyopsis echinus (Less.) O.Hoffm. (1895)

Synonyms
- Berkheya echinus (Less.) O.Hoffm. (1892); Berkheyopsis kuntzei O.Hoffm. ex Kuntze (1898); Gazania burchellii DC. (1838); Gorteria hispida Lichtst. ex Less. (1832); Hirpicium echinus Less. (1832); Meridiana echinus (Less.) Kuntze (1891)

Genus of flowering plants

Berkheyopsis echinus is a species of flowering plant in the sunflower family, Asteraceae. It is the sole species in genus Berkheyopsis. It is a perennial herb native to southern Africa, where it grows in Botswana, Namibia, and the Cape Provinces and Free State of South Africa.

It is a bushy perennial herb growing up to 40 cm tall, with multiple prickly stems growing from a long taproot. It grows in deserts and dry shrublands.

The species was first described as Hirpicium echinus by Christian Friedrich Lessing in 1832. Karl August Otto Hoffmann renamed the species Berkheyopsis echinus in 1895. Many authorities continued to treat Berkheyopsis as a synonym of Hirpicium. In 2018 Stångberg, Karis, and Anderberg concluded that Hirpicium was paraphyletic, and that the species formed a distinct clade, and revived Berkheyopsis as a monotypic genus.
