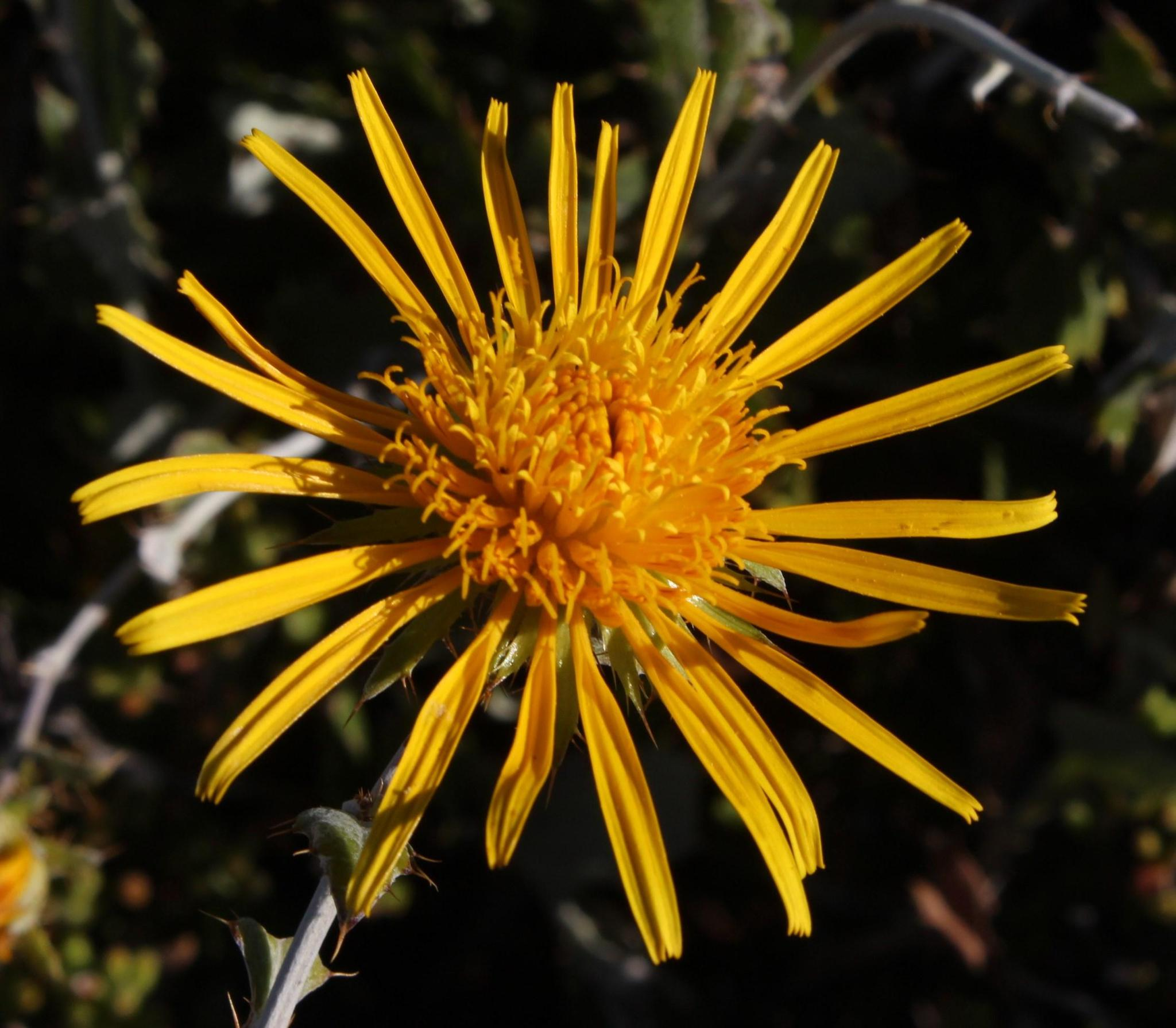

Scientific classification
- Kingdom: Plantae
- Clade: Tracheophytes
- Clade: Angiosperms
- Clade: Eudicots
- Clade: Asterids
- Order: Asterales
- Family: Asteraceae
- Genus: Berkheya
- Species: B. fruticosa

Binomial name
- Berkheya fruticosa (L.) Ehrh.

Synonyms
- Atractylis fruticosa L.; Berkheya asteroides (L.f.) Druce; Berkheya fruticosa (Thunb.) Willd.

= Berkheya fruticosa =

Species of plant

Berkheya fruticosa (Afrikaans: vaaldissel, "pale pole") is a plant native to the Succulent Karoo of South Africa's Cape Provinces.

It is a perennial meso-chamaephyte that grows 15–25 cm high. It has prickly leaves and grows dark yellow aster flowers.
