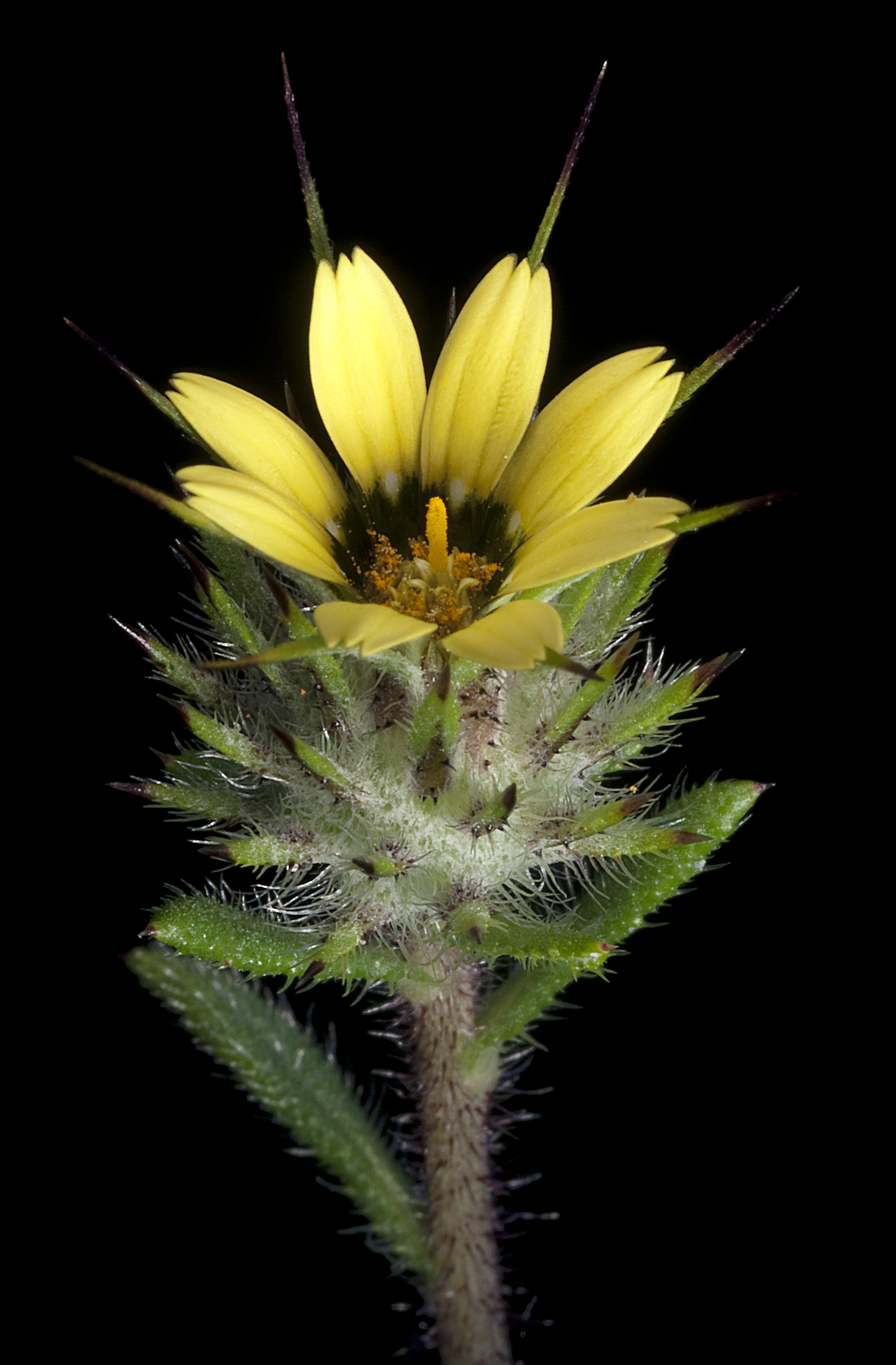

Scientific classification
- Kingdom: Plantae
- Clade: Tracheophytes
- Clade: Angiosperms
- Clade: Eudicots
- Clade: Asterids
- Order: Asterales
- Family: Asteraceae
- Genus: Gorteria
- Species: G. personata

Binomial name
- Gorteria personata L. 1759

= Gorteria personata =

Mini Beetledaisy

Annual in the daisy family from South Africa

Gorteria personata, the mini beetledaisy, is a small annual herbaceous plant in the daisy family (Compositae or Asteraceae). It is endemic to the Cape Provinces of South Africa. It is called bosduifdoring in Afrikaans.
