= Roessleria =

Scientific classification
- Kingdom: Plantae
- Clade: Tracheophytes
- Clade: Angiosperms
- Clade: Eudicots
- Clade: Asterids
- Order: Asterales
- Family: Asteraceae
- Subtribe: Gorteriinae
- Genus: Roessleria; Stångb. & Anderb. (2018)

Species
- Roessleria armerioides (DC.) Stångb. & Anderb.; Roessleria bechuanensis (S.Moore) Stångb. & Anderb.; Roessleria gazanioides (Harv.) Stångb. & Anderb.; Roessleria gorterioides (Oliv. & Hiern) Stångb. & Anderb.; Roessleria linearifolia (Bolus) Stångb. & Anderb.

Genus of flowering plants

Roessleria is a genus of flowering plants in the sunflower family, Asteraceae. It includes five species native to southern Africa, ranging from Angola and Zimbabwe to South Africa.

The species in the genus were originally placed in genus Hirpicium. That genus was found to be paraphyletic, with the five southern African species forming a distinct clade that was given the name Roessleria. The genus is named for botanist Helmut Roessler (1926–2019).

== Species ==
Five species are accepted.

- Roessleria armerioides (DC.) Stångb. & Anderb.
- Roessleria bechuanensis (S.Moore) Stångb. & Anderb.
- Roessleria gazanioides (Harv.) Stångb. & Anderb.
- Roessleria gorterioides (Oliv. & Hiern) Stångb. & Anderb.
- Roessleria linearifolia (Bolus) Stångb. & Anderb.
