= Jakob Friedrich Ehrhart =

German botanist

Jakob Friedrich Ehrhart (4 November 1742, Holderbank, Aargau – 26 June 1795) was a German botanist, a pupil of Carl Linnaeus at Uppsala University, and later director of the Botanical Garden of Hannover, where he produced several major botanical works between 1780 and 1793. Ehrhart was the first author to use the rank of subspecies in botanical literature, and he published many subspecific names between 1780 and 1789. Ehrhart issued several exsiccatae, the first one Phytophylacium Ehrhartianum, continens plantas, quas in locis earum natalibus collegit et exsiccavit Fridericus Ehrhart (1780-1785). He was one of the first who prepared exsiccatae for selling them to colleagues, namely the series Arbores, frutices et suffrutices Linnaei quas in usum dendrophilorum collegit et exsiccavit Fr. Ehrhart and Calamariae, Gramina et Tripetaloideae Linnaei, quas in usum botanicophilorum collegit et exsiccavit Fr. Ehrhart.

In 1779, Carl Peter Thunberg (1743–1828) named a genus of grasses, Ehrharta, in Ehrhart's honor.

== Publications ==
- Chloris hanoverana, 1776.
- Supplementum systematis vegetabilium, generum et specierum plantarum, 1781.
- Beiträge zur Naturkunde, und den damit verwandten Wissenschaften, besonders der Botanik, Chemie, Haus- und Landwirthschaft, Arzneigelahrtheit und Apothekerkunst, seven volumes (1787 to 1792) – Contributions to natural history, etc.
- Autobiography in Usteri's Annals of Botany.
