= Heterorhachis =

Scientific classification
- Kingdom: Plantae
- Clade: Tracheophytes
- Clade: Angiosperms
- Clade: Eudicots
- Clade: Asterids
- Order: Asterales
- Family: Asteraceae
- Subfamily: Vernonioideae
- Tribe: Arctotideae
- Subtribe: Gorteriinae
- Genus: Heterorhachis; Sch.Bip. ex Walp.

Genus of flowering plants

Heterorhachis is a genus of South African flowering plants in the family Asteraceae.

== Species ==
As of April 2024, Plants of the World Online accepted two species:

- Heterorhachis aculeata (Burm.f.) Roessler
- Heterorhachis hystrix J.C.Manning & P.O.Karis
