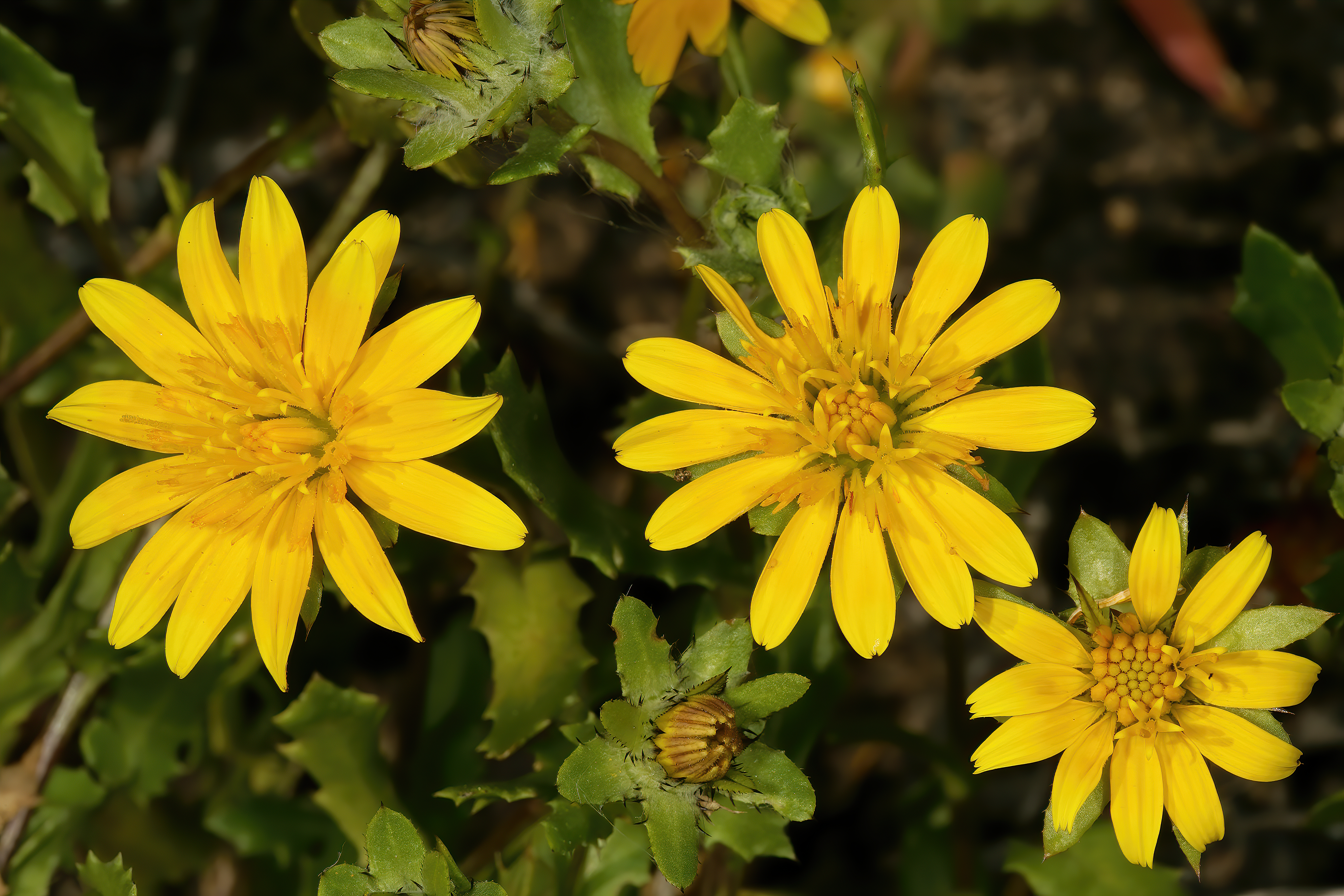

Scientific classification
- Kingdom: Plantae
- Clade: Tracheophytes
- Clade: Angiosperms
- Clade: Eudicots
- Clade: Asterids
- Order: Asterales
- Family: Asteraceae
- Subfamily: Vernonioideae
- Tribe: Arctotideae
- Subtribe: Gorteriinae
- Genus: Cuspidia; Gaertn.
- Species: C. cernua

Binomial name
- Cuspidia cernua (L.f.) B.L.Burtt

Synonyms
- Gorteria cernua L.f.; Aspidalis Gaertn.; Aspidalis araneosa Gaertn.; Agriphyllum echinatum Desf.; Berkheya cernua R.Br.; Cuspidia araneosa (Meerb.) Gaertn.; Cuspidia castrata Cass.

= Cuspidia =

Genus of flowering plants

Cuspidia is a genus of flowering plants in the family Asteraceae.

There is only one known species, Cuspidia cernua, native to the Cape Province region of South Africa.
