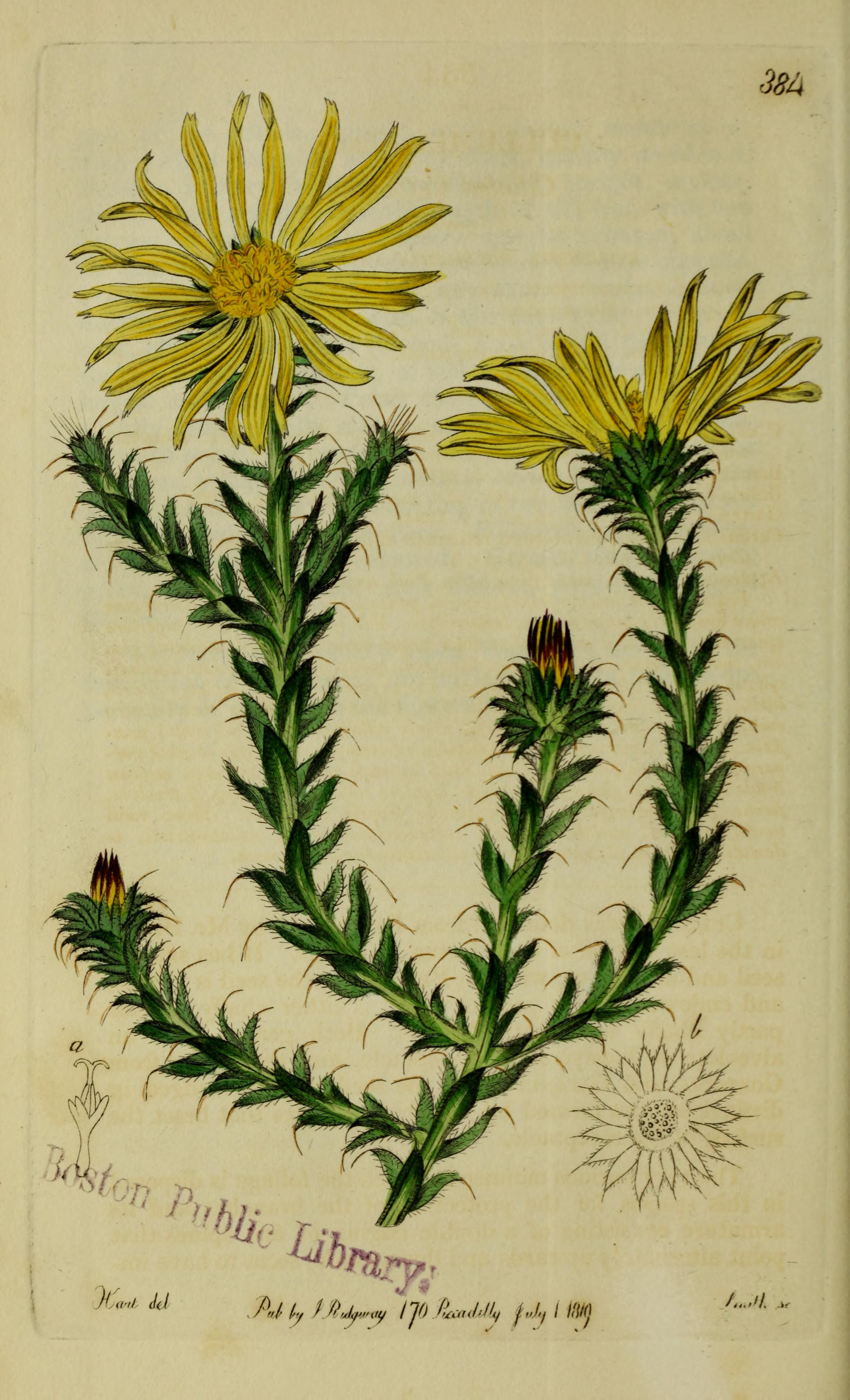
- Collumia ciliaris (Botanical register 1815)

Scientific classification
- Kingdom: Plantae
- Clade: Embryophytes
- Clade: Tracheophytes
- Clade: Angiosperms
- Clade: Eudicots
- Clade: Asterids
- Order: Asterales
- Family: Asteraceae
- Subfamily: Vernonioideae
- Tribe: Arctotideae
- Subtribe: Gorteriinae
- Genus: Cullumia; R.Br.

= Cullumia =

Genus of flowering plants

Cullumia is a genus of flowering plants in the family Asteraceae.

Species

All the species are endemic to the Cape Province region of South Africa.

- Cullumia aculeata (Houtt.) Roessler
- Cullumia bisulca (Thunb.) Less.
- Cullumia carlinoides DC.
- Cullumia cirsioides DC. s
- Cullumia decurrens Less.
- Cullumia floccosa E.Mey. ex DC.
- Cullumia micracantha DC.
- Cullumia micrantha DC.
- Cullumia patula (Thunb.) Less.
- Cullumia pectinata (Thunb.) Less.
- Cullumia reticulata (L.) Greuter, M.V.Agab. & Wagenitz
- Cullumia rigida DC.
- Cullumia selago Roessler
- Cullumia setosa (L.) Sieber ex R.Br.
- Cullumia sulcata (Thunb.) Drège ex Less.
