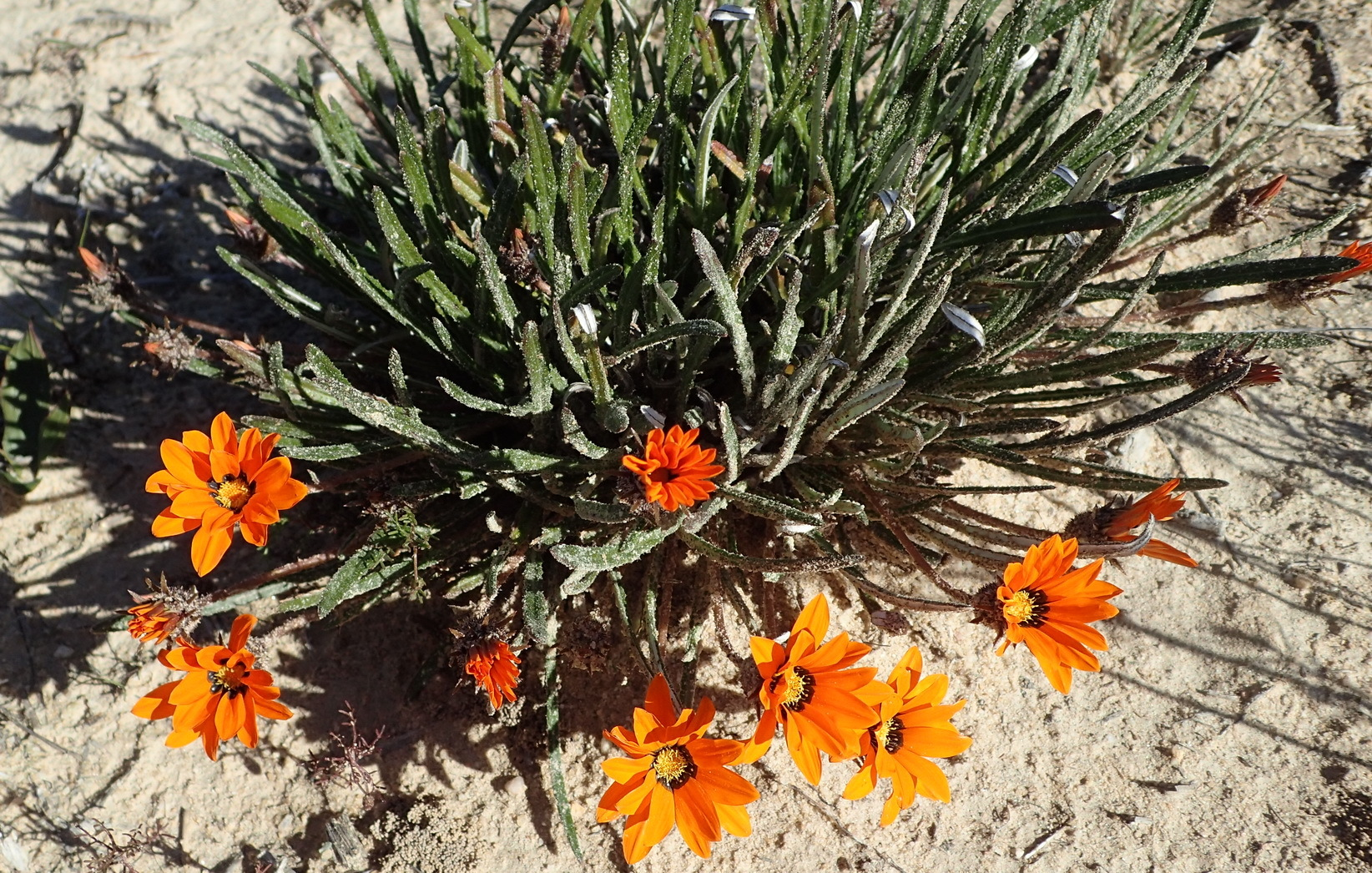

Scientific classification
- Kingdom: Plantae
- Clade: Tracheophytes
- Clade: Angiosperms
- Clade: Eudicots
- Clade: Asterids
- Order: Asterales
- Family: Asteraceae
- Genus: Gazania
- Species: G. serrata

Binomial name
- Gazania serrata DC.

= Gazania serrata =

Species of plant

Gazania serrata is a species of flowering plant in the family Asteraceae, native to the Northern Cape and Western Cape provinces, South Africa.

== Description ==
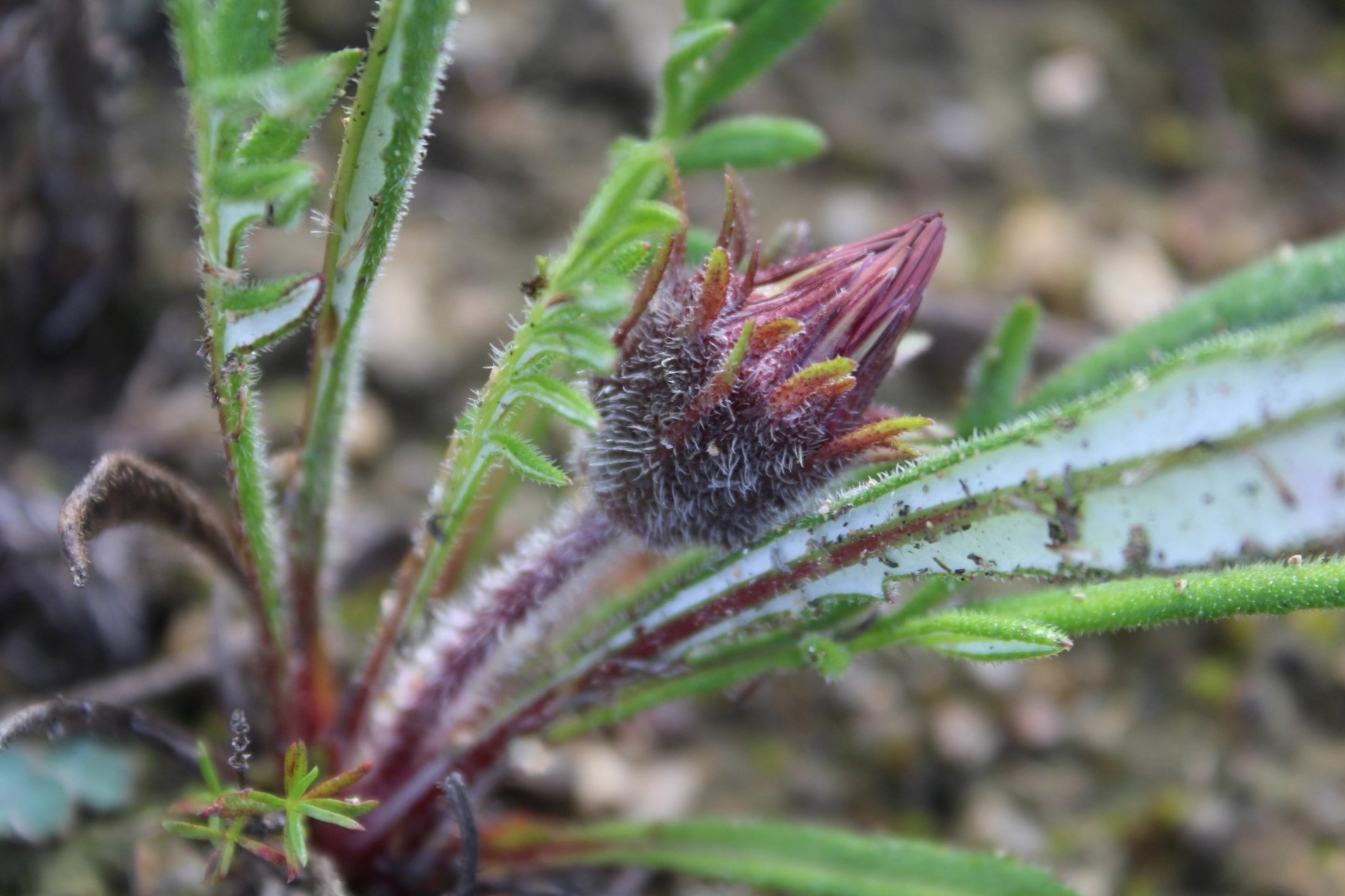
The involucre and scape of Gazania serrata are setose (hairy).

The flowers are yellow or orange, and born on setose scapes. The flower's involucre is also setose, and a campanulate shape, with an obtuse base. The involucre has at least two rows of terminal bracts around its apex, and usually some scattered parietal bracts along its length. The innermost terminal involucre bracts have an acuminate shape.

The leaves are lanceolate and can be either simple, or pinnate with linear-to-oblanceolate lobes. The margins of the leaf lobes are usually irregularly serrated. The upper leaf surface is usually rough and slightly sticky. The lower surface is tomentose (white woolly).

In its growth form, G. serrata is a compact herbaceous perennial, and forms basal rosettes with only relatively short stems. The whole plant has a slightly sticky texture.

=== Related species ===
Gazania serrata is very similar to a number of other Gazania species, including Gazania krebsiana, Gazania pectinata, Gazania linearis and Gazania rigida among others. Species boundaries between these are not clear, and they are frequently confused in practice.

In particular, it is very similar to Gazania rigida, which also has setose scapes and involucres, and occurs in similar areas of the south western Cape. However, G. serrata can usually be distinguished by its innermost terminal involucre bracts, which have acuminate tips (those of G. rigida have obtuse-acute tips). In addition, the slender G. serrata leaves usually having finely serrated margins, and an upper leaf-surface that is rough and viscous-sticky.
