= Christian Heinrich Friedrich Hesse =

- Born: March 16, 1772; Meine, Germany
- Died: January 5, 1832 (aged 59); Hoya, Germany
- Occupations: Lutheran minister, scholar, naturalist
- Known for: Contributions to theology, botany, and entomology
- Notable work: Translation and supplementation of Reverend Latrobe's account
- Spouse: Engela Apollonia Bergh
- Children: 7, including Heinrich Ludwig Helenus Hesse
- Awards: Hessea genus and species Erica hesseana named in his honor

Christian Heinrich Friedrich Hesse (16 March 1772 – 5 January 1832) was a Lutheran minister, scholar and naturalist.

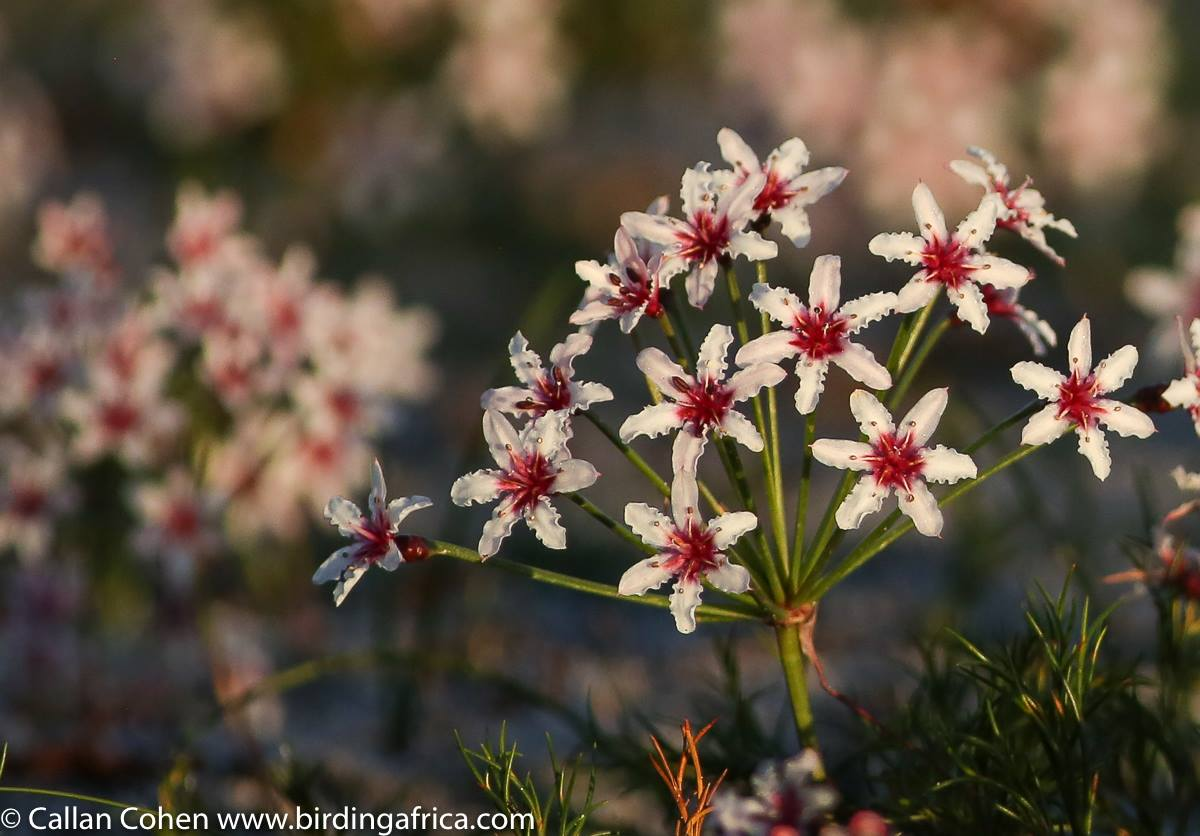
Hessea cinnamomea (L'Hér.) T.Durand & Schinz

== Biography ==
Hesse was a student of theology at the University of Göttingen between 1790 and 1792 after which he took up a teaching post in Hanover. After passing his theological examination with distinction in 1799, he was sent to the Lutheran parish of Cape Town, landing there in September 1800. Initially his sermons were in German, but over the course of time he switched to Dutch.

Hesse was enthusiastic about natural history, especially entomology and botany, growing a large variety of succulents in his garden. His neighbour was the equally enthusiastic apothecary Peter Heinrich Poleman who provided a great deal of encouragement. He befriended and housed a number of visiting scientists, such as Hinrich Lichtenstein and Captain Dugald Carmichael. In 1808, he sent William John Burchell, then on the island of St Helena, a parcel of some 150 seeds, mainly from bulbous plants; Burchell stayed with Hesse once he arrived at the Cape in November 1810 and went on several botanising rambles with him. Dutch botanist Caspar Georg Carl Reinwardt visited the Cape on his way to the East Indies early in 1816; he identified some Aloes from Hesse's garden and requested that Hesse collect plants for Martin van Marum, the Dutch physicist from Haarlem. Consequently, Hesse sent van Marum various species of Aloe, Cotyledon, Crassula, Stapelia and Euphorbia in 1817. Reverend Christian Ignatius Latrobe, who called in on the Cape in 1815-1816, praised Hesse's garden for its diversity of plants. Karl Heinrich Bergius visited the Cape in 1816-1818, became friendly with Hesse and went on botanical excursions with him. Hesse sent some Cape insects to the mineralogist Johann Friedrich Ludwig Hausmann of Göttingen, who visited Cape Town much later. According to Caspar Georg Carl Reinwardt he also sent natural history objects to the physiologist and anatomist Johann Friedrich Blumenbach in Göttingen.

Hesse was active in the public affairs of Cape Town, particularly in education. He was one of the seven members of the "Council of Scholarchs", tasked with managing education at the Cape under the aegis of the Governor. He later acted as the council's secretary and was paid a stipend by the government. Known as an intelligent man of impeccable character, he was popular and held in high regard by officialdom, his parishioners and the public. When he sailed from the Cape in 1817 Lord Charles Somerset penned a testimonial lauding his work.

Hesse returned to Germany, first to the parish of Nieuburg, then to Elbingrode (1822-1825), and lastly to Hoya, even so maintaining contact with the Lutherans of the Cape. He finished German (1820) and Dutch (1823) versions of Latrobe's account of his visit to the Cape of 1815-1816, supplementing it with notes on the animals and plants referred to. He also added three appendices, the first on the cultivation of European and other exotic plants at the Cape, the second dealing with whaling at the Cape, while the third provided a summary of recent transformations in Cape Town and the colony. One of the appendices deals with the slates and granites around Cape Town, while briefly touching on some rocks and minerals found in the colony. A volume of his Cape sermons in Dutch appeared in 1833 after his death.

He was married in Cape Town on 17 January 1802 to Engela Apollonia Bergh (born 1786), daughter of Oloff Marthinus Bergh (1763-1835) and Johanna Catharina Wieser (1763-1838). Christian and Engela had seven children which included a son Heinrich Ludwig Helenus Hesse (*1828 in Hoya).

The English botanist William Herbert named the Amaryllid genus Hessea in his honour. He is further commemorated in Erica hesseana, and in the lichen he collected, Stictina hesseana.
