= Georg Ludwig Engelhard Krebs =

German botanist (1792-1844)

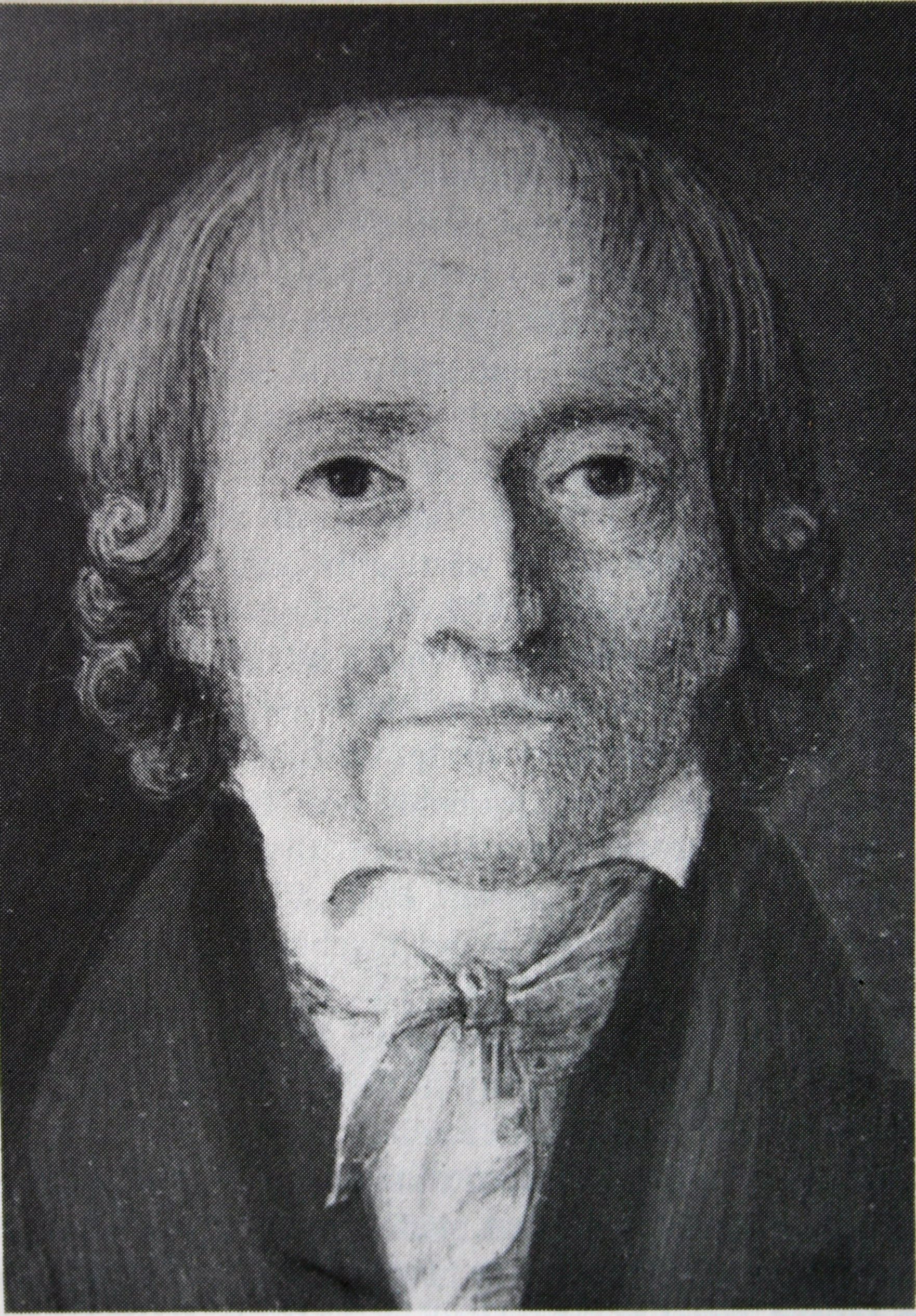
Ludwig Krebs

Georg Ludwig Engelhard Krebs (19 July 1792 – 11 May 1844) was a German apothecary and natural history collector who spent most of his career in Cape Colony.

== Life and career ==
He was born in Wittingen, then a part of Electorate of Hanover in the Holy Roman Empire. He was the son of Johan Krebs and Cecilia Engtlingen, and brother to Sophie Margaretha Dorothea Krebs and Georg Krebs.

Krebs moved to Verden he was 14 years old and later started an apprenticeship as an apothecary in either Barth or Hamburg. His studies were interrupted in 1812, when he was conscripted to fight in the Napoleonic Wars, but by 1817, he had completed his courses and was recruited to work in South Africa by the firm of Pallas & Poleman of Cape Town. Arriving in May 1817, Krebs started collecting, often in the company of Karl Heinrich Bergius who died at age 28 of pulmonary tuberculosis in January 1818, poverty-stricken and abandoned by his former sponsors and employers. Krebs also got to know and collected in the company of Mund and Maire, Joachim Brehm, von Chamisso, Delalande, and Dr. William Gill, who became a close friend and medical adviser during their stay in the Eastern Cape.

Krebs asked his brother, Georg, a medical student in Berlin, to find out whether the Berlin's Natural History Museum was interested in purchasing natural history specimens. When Martin Lichtenstein agreed to this, some large consignments were shipped in 1820 and 1821.

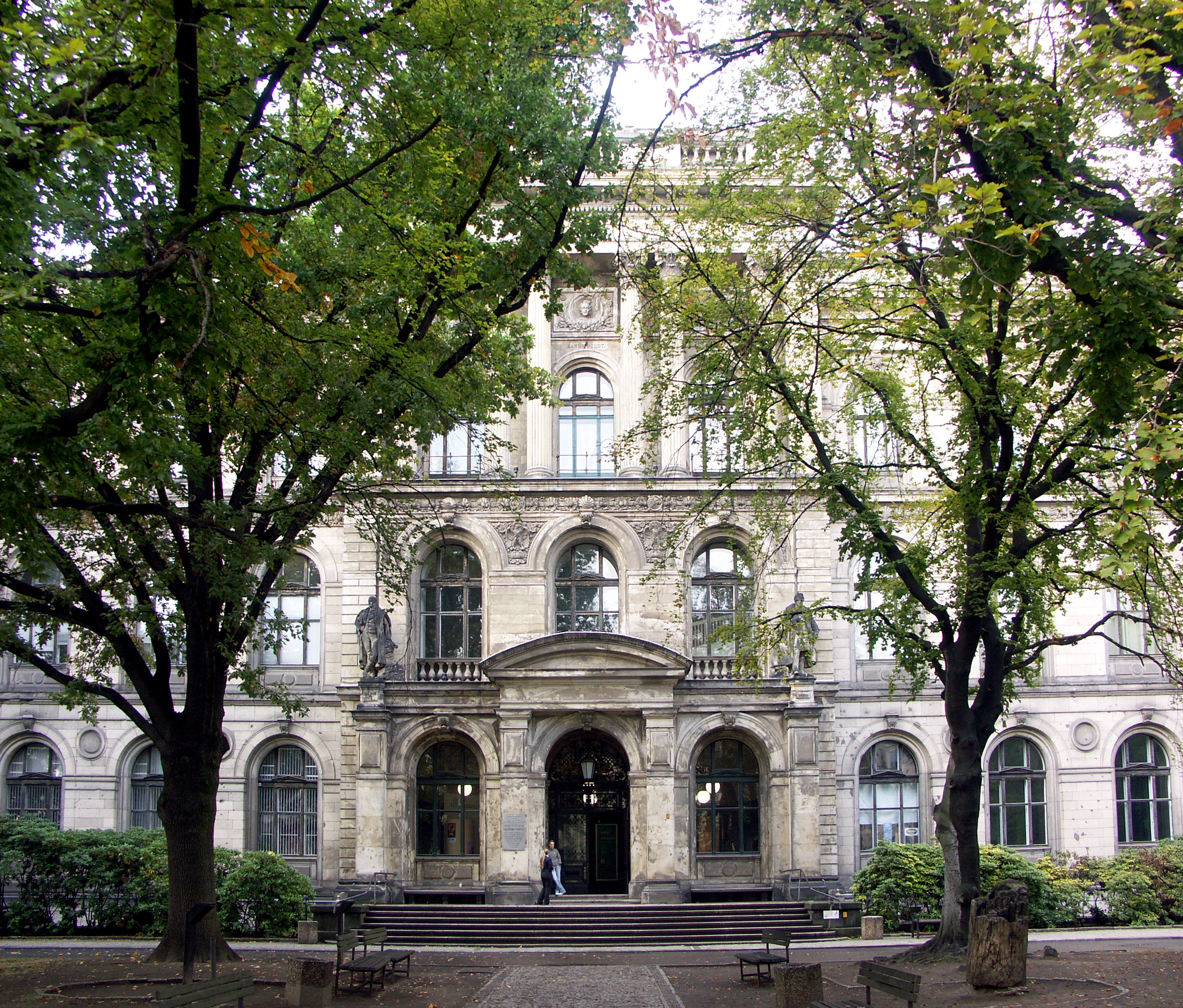
Opened in 1810, Berlin's Natural History Museum purchased many specimens collected by Krebs in South Africa.

At the end of his four-year contract with Pallas & Poleman, Krebs was succeeded by Carl Friedrich Drège, the brother of Johann Franz Drège, leaving him free to sail to Algoa Bay where he arrived in November 1821. He left immediately for the inland town of Uitenhage where he was to stay the next three years. Back in Germany, Lichtenstein had obtained permission for Krebs to collect on behalf of the Berlin's Natural History Museum, resulting in the splendid title of "Cape Naturalist to the King of Prussia".

In 1822 Krebs collected at Uitenhage, Sundays River, Galgenbosch, Van Stadens River, Zuurberg and Swartkops, sending four consignments to Lichtenstein, which consisted mainly of birds, mammals and insects, but with some bulbs and succulent plants, assisted and advised by James Bowie. In 1823 he roamed further afield visiting the Bushmans, Kariega and Kowie Rivers, sending off his eighth consignment of 3800 insects, some 100 birds and no plants.

In August 1823 he visited the newly established Fort Beaufort, collecting for a few months along the Baviaans River, now called Baviaanskloof River, and eastwards to the Great Fish River, returning to Uitenhage by January 1824. His 9th and 10th consignments were shipped from Cape Town in January 1825.

In 1824 Lichtenstein warned him that his contract for supplying specimens to the Berlin Museum was about to end and that they would only accept 3 further consignments. Krebs sailed to Cape Town in November 1824 to discuss his future with Poleman. Krebs had thought of starting a pharmacy somewhere in the Cape, and wrote to his brother inviting him to join in the enterprise. Early in 1825 he returned to Algoa Bay, making his way once more to the Baviaans River, where he stayed again on the Boschfontein farm belonging to Field Cornet Cornelius van der Nest, a farm which was also periodically visited by Clemenz Wehdemann.

In the following summer Krebs explored and collected beyond the Winterberg in the area of present-day Queenstown, and soon dispatched his eleventh consignment made up of six cases. By June 1826 he had started a pharmacy in Grahamstown, taking on Leopold Schmidt as a partner, and hoped to persuade his two nephews, Carl and Heinrich Kemper, two trained apothecaries, to also join him.

In March 1828 his health suffered a blow when, while on a visit to Cape Town, he was stricken by rheumatism, a condition he was to endure for the rest of his life. Consequently, he convalesced for six months, staying with Pieter Heinrich Poleman. At about this time his application for citizenship was approved, enabling him to buy a farm called "Doornkroon" on the Baviaans River, and which he later renamed "Lichtenstein" in honour of his patron, Martin Lichtenstein. Carl Kemper arrived in Cape Town in January 1829 and joined Krebs at Baviaans River. In November 1829 Krebs sent through his 12th consignment made up of material collected over several years; included were more than 7000 preserved plant specimens and a barrel with a complete Bushman pickled in brine, some 900 birds and over 7000 insects. These specimens had been collected from Baviaans River, Tembuland, and the Tarka and Orange Rivers.

His brother Georg arrived in Cape Town in May 1834 and was granted a medical licence, joining the other members of the family at "Lichtenstein" in July. Much work went into building up the farm after it had been through the Sixth Kaffir War of 1834/5. Krebs' letters about the war survive. Georg set up a practice in Graaff-Reinet, later becoming District Surgeon. Krebs' partner Leopold Schmidt died in July 1836 and Krebs disposed of all his Grahamstown interests, but continued dispensing from the farm.

For a long time Ludwig Krebs had been thinking about an expedition north of the Orange and Vaal Rivers. Accordingly, accompanied by his nephew Carl Klemper, he left his farm in March 1838 with four wagons. His route was through the present-day Aliwal North, Jammersberg near Wepener, Thaba Nchu, north-east toward Clocolan, Mpharane near Ficksburg, and northwards to the Makwassie area. He crossed the Sand River near the present Senekal and followed it westward, and then northwards to the Vals River. He went west again crossing the Vaal River, probably at Kommando Drift, and then northwards to the Makwassie highlands where he collected for several weeks. His return leg followed a more westerly route, and he arrived at 'Lichtenstein' toward the end of December 1838. Another expedition was planned for Natal, but his chronic rheumatism made this extremely difficult, though there is evidence that Carl Klemper may have visited the region in 1839 or 1840.

He died at "Lichtenstein" farm near Bedford, Eastern Cape, South Africa, at the age of 51.

== Legacy ==
Ludwig Krebs put together one of the most extensive natural history collections from Africa to reach Europe. Their value was slightly debased by Lichtenstein's breaking up the collections for auctioning and citing their provenance as "Kaffraria", whereas Krebs had provided detailed notes on the localities on his original labels.

Krebs is commemorated in numerous plant and animal specific names including Gazania krebsiana and uniquely in the monotypic Glekia krebsiana, belonging to the Scrophulariaceae, the genus formed from his initials by Olive Mary Hilliard, and the species by George Bentham - this is an alpine species found on the high mountains of Lesotho and Cape Provinces (region of South Africa). 'Krebs's fat mouse', Steatomys krebsii Peters, 1852, was also named in his honour.

== Bibliography ==
- "Ludwig Krebs. Cape naturalist to the king of Prussia 1792-1844" - Pamela M. ffolliott, Richard Liversidge (AA Balkema, 1971) ASIN: B000X92WLI
