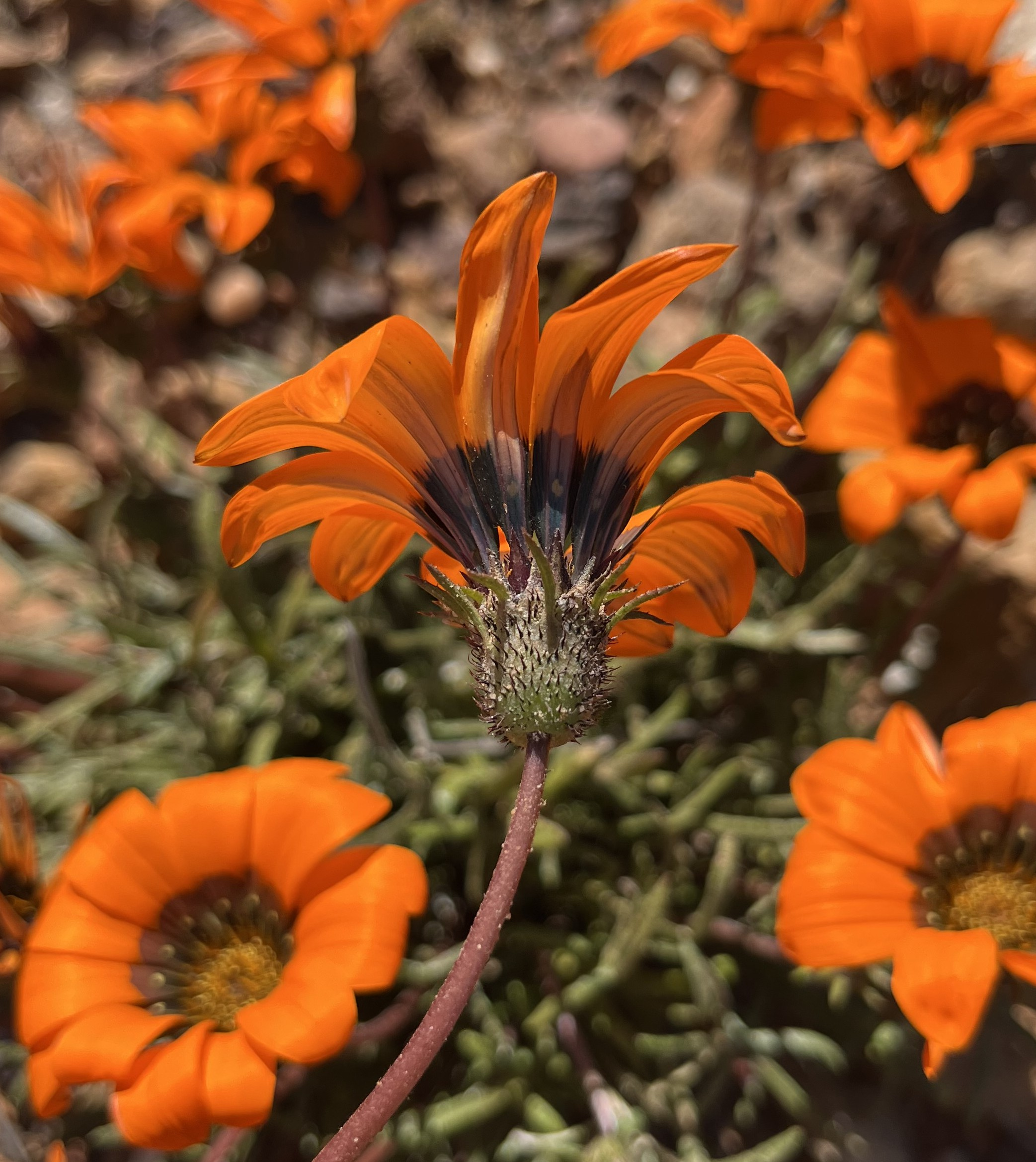
- The distinctive hairy (setose) calyx of Gazania rigida.

Scientific classification
- Kingdom: Plantae
- Clade: Tracheophytes
- Clade: Angiosperms
- Clade: Eudicots
- Clade: Asterids
- Order: Asterales
- Family: Asteraceae
- Genus: Gazania
- Species: G. rigida

Binomial name
- Gazania rigida (Burm.f.) Roessler

= Gazania rigida =

Species of plant

Gazania rigida, the "Karoo Gazania", is a species of flower native to the Western Cape and Northern Cape Provinces of South Africa.

== Description ==
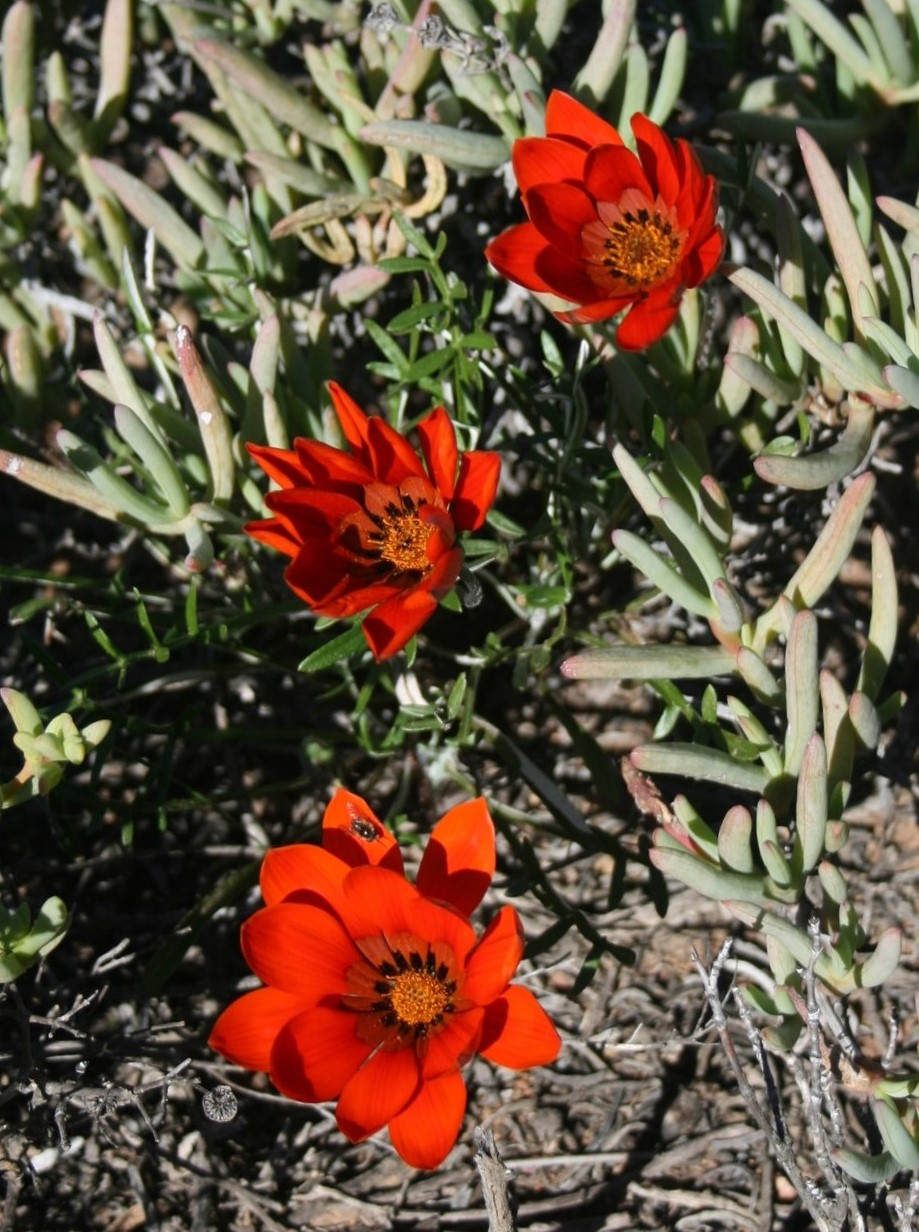
Gazania rigida in habitat near Worcester, South Africa.

The flowers vary in colour from yellow to reddish-orange, often with brown-to-black patches at the petal bases. They are born on long, setose scapes.

The involucre is usually hairy (setose), obtusely bell-shaped (campanulate) and 8-10mm wide. In addition to a few irregularly-placed, ciliate parietal bracts, the involucre also has at its apex two or three rows of terminal bracts.

- The outermost row of terminal bracts are linear with acute tips and ciliate margins, much like the parietal bracts.
- The innermost row of terminal bracts are triangular with obtuse-acute tips and membranous margins (in contrast, those of Gazania serrata are acuminate).

The linear-lanceolate leaves are usually pinnate with linear-to-elliptic lobes, but can sometimes also be simple. The upper leaf-surface is usually spinescent-to-rough, but can sometimes be smooth. Like many Gazania species, the leaf undersides are tomentose, and the lower leaf margins are spinescent-to-ciliate. (In contrast, the leaves of Gazania serrata are sticky and have more clearly serrated margins).

=== Related species ===
Gazania rigida is very similar to a number of other Gazania species, including Gazania serrata, Gazania krebsiana, Gazania pectinata and Gazania linearis among others. Species boundaries between these are not clear, and they are frequently confused in practice.

- Gazania serrata, a higher altitude montane species, can be distinguished from G. rigida by its inner terminal bracts which have acuminate tips (those of G. rigida have obtuse-acute tips).
- Gazania krebsiana, an extremely widespread and variable species, can be distinguished from G. rigida by its parietal and outer terminal bracts having smooth (not ciliate) margins. The involucre of Gazania krebsiana is also always glabrous.
- Gazania pectinata, which is mostly confined to coastal areas in the far south west of the Western Cape, is usually (though not always) an annual species.
