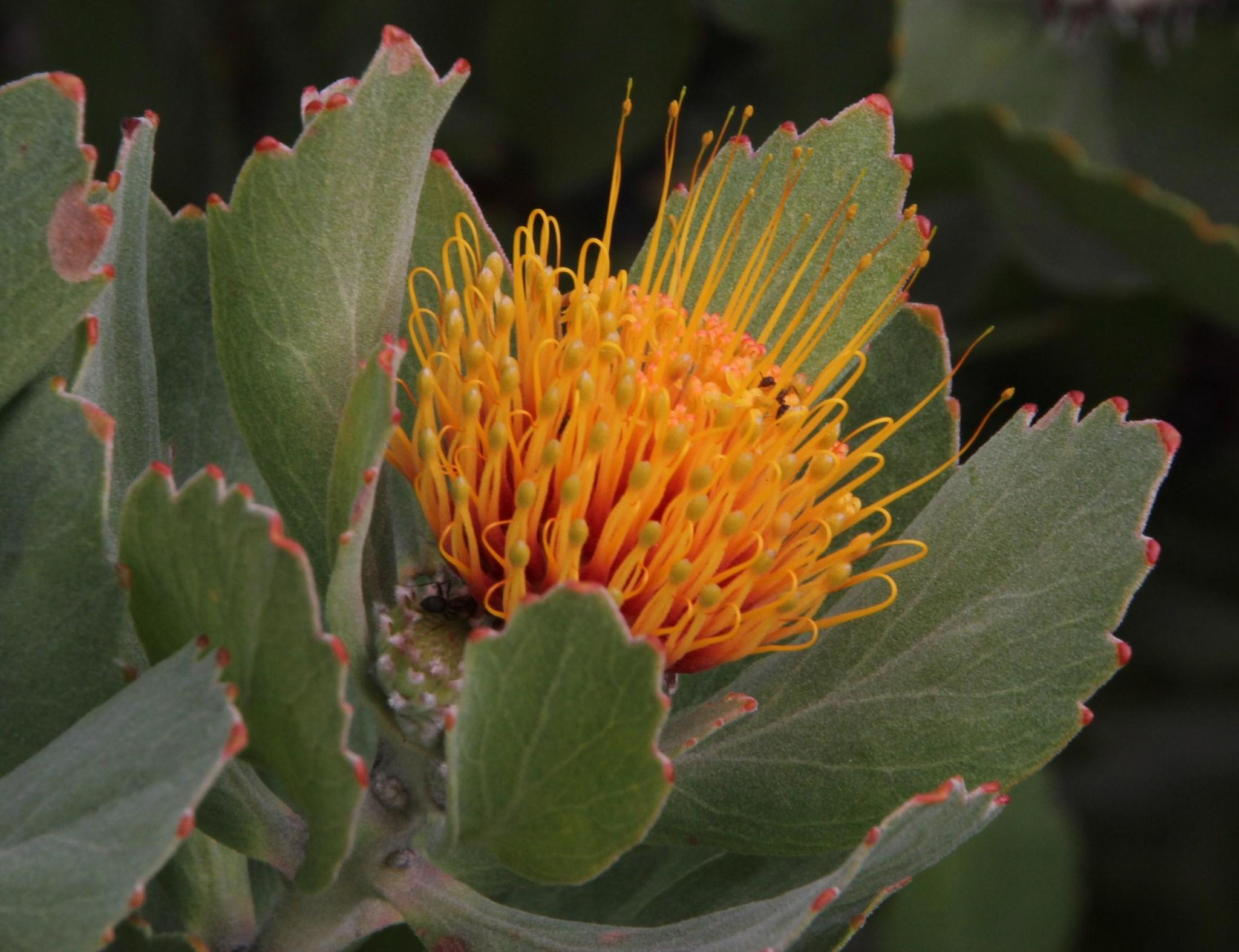

Conservation status
- Vulnerable (IUCN 3.1)

Scientific classification
- Kingdom: Plantae
- Clade: Embryophytes
- Clade: Tracheophytes
- Clade: Angiosperms
- Clade: Eudicots
- Order: Proteales
- Family: Proteaceae
- Genus: Leucospermum
- Species: L. mundii

Binomial name
- Leucospermum mundii Meisn.

Synonyms
- Leucadendron mundtii; Leucospermum purpureum

= Leucospermum mundii =

Species of plant native to South Africa

Leucospermum mundii is an evergreen, upright, rounded and richly branching shrub of 1/2–1 m (1 1/2–3 ft) high that is assigned to the family Proteaceae. It has greyish, felty hairy, or hairless leaves that are broadly wedge-shaped to very broadly inverted egg-shaped, 5–8 1/2 cm (2–3 1/2 in) long and 2–6 1/2 cm (3/4–2 1/2 in) wide and whorl-shaped flower heads that have shades of pale yellow to crimson, of 2–4 cm (0.8–1.6 in) long and 1–2 cm (0.4–0.8 in) wide that grow in clusters of three to ten. Their long styles that emerge from the head jointly give the impression of a pincushion, with the pins upright. It is called Langeberg pincushion in English. Flowering heads can be found between July and November. It naturally occurs in fynbos in the Western Cape province of South Africa.

== Description ==
Leucospermum mundii is an upright, rounded and richly branching shrub of 1/2–1 m (1 1/2–3 ft) high, that develops from a trunk at its base. The flowering stems are 5–6 mm (0.20–0.24 in) thick and grey due to a thick layer of felty hairs. The greyish, felty hairy or hairless leaves are broadly wedge-shaped to very broadly inverted egg-shaped, 5–8 1/2 cm (2–3 1/2 in) long and 2–6 1/2 cm (3/4–2 1/2 in) wide, almost seated or with a very short stalk and seven to seventeen teeth near the tip.

The flower heads have a whorl shape (or are turbinate), are 2–4 cm (0.8–1.6 in) long and 1–2 cm (0.4–0.8 in) wide, and grow in clusters of three to ten. Each is on a stalk of 1–1 1/2 cm (0.4–0.6 in) long. The common base of the flowers in the same head is flattened and 6–7 mm (0.24–0.28 in) wide. The bracts that subtend the head have a pointy tip and are lance-shaped to oval, 5–7 mm (0.20–0.28 in) long and 3–5 mm (0.12–0.20 in) wide, overlapping, cartilaginous in consistency, densely silky, the tip slightly hooked and thickened. The bract that subtends each flower individually is rectangular, about 5 mm (0.20 in) long and 2 mm (0.08 in) wide, embraces the flower at its base (or obtrullate), cartilaginous in consistency, densely softly hairy, the tip hooked. The initially yellow, 4-merous perianth is 16–18 mm (0.64–0.72 in) long. The lowest, fully merged, part of the perianth, called tube is dull carmine in colour, 8–10 mm long, narrow cylinder-shaped and hairless at its base and inflated and powdery hairy higher up. The middle part (or claws), where the perianth is split lengthwise is initially pale yellow but changes to orange with age. It consists of four thread-thin, roughly hairy lobes that all individually curved back near their tip. The upper part (or limbs), which enclosed the pollen presenter in the bud, consists of four pale green, pointy, elliptic to lance-shaped lobes of about 1 1/2 mm (0.06 in) long. From the perianth emerges a straight, thread-shaped, pale yellow style of 2 1/2–2 7/8 cm (1–1 1/8 in) long. The thickened part at the tip of the style called pollen presenter is thread-thin, bluntly cylinder-shaped, 1/2–1 mm (0.02–0.04 in) long and hard to distinguish from the style. It has a groove that functions as the stigma across the very tip. The ovary is subtended by four opaque, blunt, thread-shaped scales of 2–2 1/2 mm (0.08–0.10 in) long.

The subtribe Proteinae, to which the genus Leucospermum has been assigned, consistently has a basic chromosome number of twelve (2n=24).

=== Differences with related species ===
Leucospermum mundii differs from all other taxa in the section Crinitae by its broad wedge to inverted egg-shaped leaves, topped by seven to seventeen teeth.

== Taxonomy ==
As far as we know, the Langeberg pincushion was first collected by Leopold Mund in the Tradouw mountains. Probably because the flower heads were already in a fruiting stage when collected, Mund proposed to call it L. purpureum. Carl Meissner used this specimen to describe the species but called it Leucadendron mundii in 1856. Otto Kuntze who lumped many species, moved the species in 1891 to Leucadendron, in the process making a writing error in the species name as leucadendron mundtii. John Patrick Rourke in 1970, regards these names as synonymous. L. mundii has been assigned to the section Crinitae. The species name mundii refers to the plant hunter Leopold Mund.

== Distribution and ecology ==
Leucospermum mundii can be found in the Langeberg mountain range, where it is known from only a few localitions, between Garcia's Pass, above Riversdale and Goedgeloof Peak, above Swellendam, where it grows on northern slopes in southwest facing gorges at 300–900 m (1000–3000 ft) altitude. These are very well drained positions on Table Mountain Sandstone, but the average annual precipitation of anywhere between 635 and 1015 mm (25–40 in) is relatively high for the Cape. The plants grow in a dense fynbos vegetation that further is dominated by several Restionaceae, Protea eximia, P. neriifolia, and Leucadendron eucalyptifolium.
