= Clemenz Heinrich Wehdemann =

German soldier, artist, and naturalist

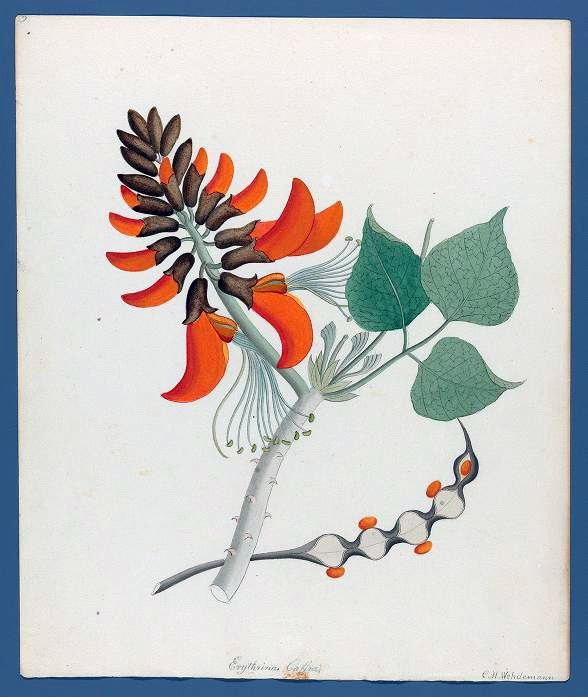
Erythrina afra from "Drawings of plants collected at Cape Town" (c1820)

Clemenz Heinrich Wehdemann (1762 Breda-Resa near Hanover - 25 September 1835 "Lichtenstein" near Bedford, Eastern Cape ), a German soldier, artist and naturalist arrived in the Cape Colony in the service of the Dutch East India Company in 1784, and was probably a member of the Württemberg Regiment. Wehdemann was the son of a church minister and enjoyed a sound education.

During the British occupation (1795-1803) he gave drawing classes, and with the Dutch reoccupation (1803-1806) he re-entered army service. With the British reoccupation of the Cape, he settled at Plettenberg Bay in the Eastern Cape, collecting botanical specimens for Joseph Mackrill (1762-1820), a practitioner with a special interest in medicinal plants. Mackrill established a garden and trial ground for crops in Somerset East, occasionally sending herbarium material to the British Museum. Wehdemanne developed an interest in indigenous trees and produced a number of sets of annotated paintings, some of species new to science. Two of these ended up in the libraries of the Natural History Museum and the Royal Botanic Gardens, Kew, one with the National Botanical Institute in Pretoria and one with the Parliamentary Library in Cape Town. In addition to these he prepared hinged, book-like boxes, the wood and bark forming the box, and its contents, all being from the same tree species; the contents consisting of fruit and seeds, pressed leaves and flowers, together with drawings or paintings and a description. Similar boxes were to be found only in Japan and Europe.

Wehdemann died destitute on the Baviaans River farm "Lichtenstein" belonging to his friend, Ludwig Krebs, the noted Prussian collector. He was commemorated in Ichthyosma wehdemanni Schltdl. in the Balanophoraceae, which turned out to be a synonym of Sarcophyte sanguinea Sparrm.
