= Glekia =

Scientific classification
- Kingdom: Plantae
- Clade: Tracheophytes
- Clade: Angiosperms
- Clade: Eudicots
- Clade: Asterids
- Order: Lamiales
- Family: Scrophulariaceae
- Genus: Glekia; Hilliard

Synonyms
- Phyllopodium krebsianum Benth.

Genus of plants

Glekia is a monotypic genus of flowering plants belonging to the family Scrophulariaceae. It only contains the one species, Glekia krebsiana (Benth.) Hilliard

Its native range is southern Africa. It is found in Lesotho and the Cape Provinces (region of South Africa).

The genus name of Glekia is in honour of Georg Ludwig Engelhard Krebs (1792–1844), a German apothecary and natural history collector, and it was first described and published in Notes Roy. Bot. Gard. Edinburgh Vol.45 on page 482 in (1988, publ. 1989).
