= Mund and Maire =

19th century natural historians in the Cape Colony

Johannes Ludwig Leopold Mund (1791-1831) and Louis Maire (fl. 1815-1833) were natural history collectors who worked in the Cape Colony under the sponsorship of the Berlin Museum of Natural History. Museum specimens they collected were always labeled under the names, "Mund & Maire".

Both were born in Berlin of French parents. Mund, a qualified apothecary, and Maire, a qualified physician, had both served in the Prussian Army during the Napoleonic Wars with Karl Heinrich Bergius. Mund served as field apothecary and was released from military service by the intervention of Minister Altenstein. Maire had later been employed as a gardener in Berlin. They were sent to South Africa by the Museum at the behest of the Prussian government and travelled via England, where they met Sir Joseph Banks at Kew.

They arrived at the Cape in October 1816 and re-established contact with Bergius, who introduced them to interesting collecting localities. Mund had a passion for orchids and accompanied Krebs on many of his excursions around Cape Town. Adelbert von Chamisso called in at the Cape in April 1818 aboard the "Rurik", entertaining Krebs and Mund, Mund awaking to find the ship at sea. He was most fortunate to be transferred to a port-bound vessel that they happened to encounter. Mund and Maire sent off two large consignments to Berlin. However, the Museum was not pleased as it felt the pair had squandered the grant made to them, part of which came from the House of Rothschild in Paris. Martin Lichtenstein complained bitterly in an 1820 letter that the pair had not come up to expectations and ordered them to return to Berlin, an order which was ignored by both, leading to a formal termination of their services in 1821. George Thom, the Scots missionary and minister, wrote to Hooker in 1824, claiming that "the collectors from Prussia spend their time in sloth and gaiety in Cape Town, and are now sunk lower than any Colonist".

After the termination of his contract, Mund drifted eastward, visiting Plettenberg Bay and Knysna and reaching Uitenhage. Later Mund took up the position of land surveyor at Plettenberg Bay, with Maire deciding to practise medicine in Graaff-Reinet. From his letters to William Hooker in 1827 and 1829, Mund continued to collect, though likely on a smaller scale. Both Thomas Miller and George Thom, who were sending botanical specimens to Hooker, had great difficulty in persuading Mund to part with any of his collection - in Thom's case, not surprisingly. Carl Drège noted in his diary that when he and his brother Franz visited Mund in Swellendam on 4 February 1830, Mund had been in bed since November 1829, paralysed down his left side. Mund eventually succumbed to a bladder infection in Cape Town in 1831.

Mund is commemorated in the genus Mundia (since synonymised to Acanthocladus and Nylandtia), and in several species names such as Protea mundii, Helichrysum mundtii, Bupleurum mundtii, Scolopia mundii, Thaminophyllum mundii, Leucospermum mundii, Otholobium mundianum, Phoberos mundii and Afrocanthium mundianum. He is denoted by the author abbreviation Mund when citing a botanical name.

Maire was commemorated in Mairia, a South African genus of 3 species in the family Compositae. The specimens they collected were always labelled 'Mund and Maire'.
