= Pallas & Poleman =

South African pharmacists

Pallas & Poleman were South African pharmacists who played a considerable role in plant collecting in the Cape Colony during the years 1810 to 1839, by employing young German pharmacists such as Bergius, Krebs, Drège and Ecklon.

Dietrich Pallas was born in Alsace in about 1768, received his medical qualifications in Paris, and arrived at the Cape in 1791 as surgeon in Comte de Meuron's Swiss Regiment, later being appointed surgeon-major to the Cape Garrison. Pallas went on to open the first apothecary shop in Cape Town and in 1802 employed Pieter Heinrich Poleman as manager. This led to a partnership in 1810 which lasted until Poleman's death in 1839, whereupon the shop in Strand Street was sold to S. H. Scheuble & Co. Pallas, who had become a dotard in his senility, died in 1840.

Peter Heinrich Poleman was born in 1779 or 1780 in Altona in Holstein, and trained as a chemist and apothecary. He arrived in the Cape in 1802, planning to work for the pharmacist Schmidt, but joined Pallas instead. In 1811 he married Mrs Pallas' eldest daughter from a former marriage to a certain J. C. Schweinhagen. Pallas' other stepdaughter, Magdalena Elizabeth Schweinhagen, married the surgeon James Abercrombie (1798-1870), one of the British Settlers who had arrived in Cape Town with Moodie's Party in 1817. In 1803 Poleman applied to the Governor for a licence to distil a volatile oil from the buchu plant.

Pallas collected only a handful of plants during his lifetime. Poleman, though, was an active collector, and Lichtenstein during his 1802-1806 stay at the Cape, made regular Sunday collecting excursions in the company of Poleman. As a result of these botanical forays, and when Lichtenstein became director of the Berlin Zoological Museum, he realised that he could greatly enrich the museum's collections by sending enthusiastic young naturalists as assistants to Pallas & Poleman. Poleman went up Table Mountain with Burchell during the latter's stay in Cape Town before his 5-year odyssey over Southern Africa. Poleman was also on friendly terms with William Henry Harvey, the Irish botanist, and Christian Ignatius Latrobe, the Moravian clergyman, artist, musician and composer. Poleman died in Cape Town on 16 April 1839. He was commemorated in the Apiaceae genus Polemannia created by Eckl. & Zeyh.

Karl Heinrich Bergius was Lichtenstein's first emissary, sent out in 1815. He boarded with the Pallas family and turned out to be a diligent collector to the neglect of his pharmacy duties. The odours from his collection permeated the Pallas house, becoming a source of friction, so much so that he requested to be released from his contract, a release granted in June 1817. His death from tuberculosis followed in January 1818. After this Pallas & Poleman did their own recruiting in Germany.
