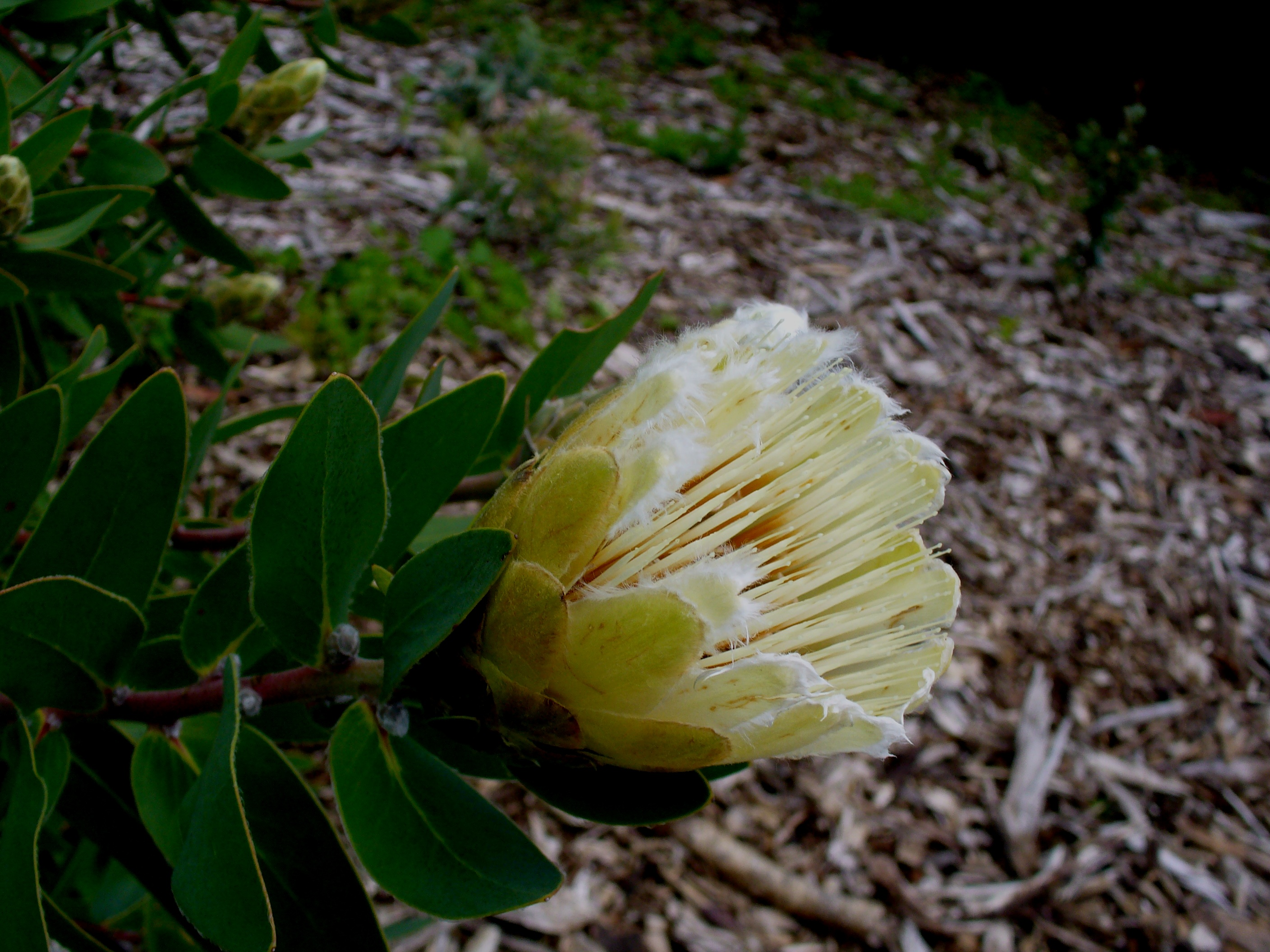

Conservation status
- Least Concern (IUCN 3.1)

Scientific classification
- Kingdom: Plantae
- Clade: Embryophytes
- Clade: Tracheophytes
- Clade: Angiosperms
- Clade: Eudicots
- Order: Proteales
- Family: Proteaceae
- Genus: Protea
- Species: P. mundii

Binomial name
- Protea mundii Klotzsch

= Protea mundii =

Species of flowering plant

Protea mundii, the forest sugarbush, is a flowering shrub native to the Cape Provinces of South Africa, growing in forest margins at 200 to 1,300 m (660 to 4,270 ft) elevation. It grows to a height of 8 m (26 ft). The plant has white to ivory flowers, which are attractive to bees, butterflies and/or birds. The specific name commemorates Johannes Ludwig Leopold Mund, a German natural history collector who was active in the Cape until 1831.

Protea mundii is cultivated as a garden plant.
