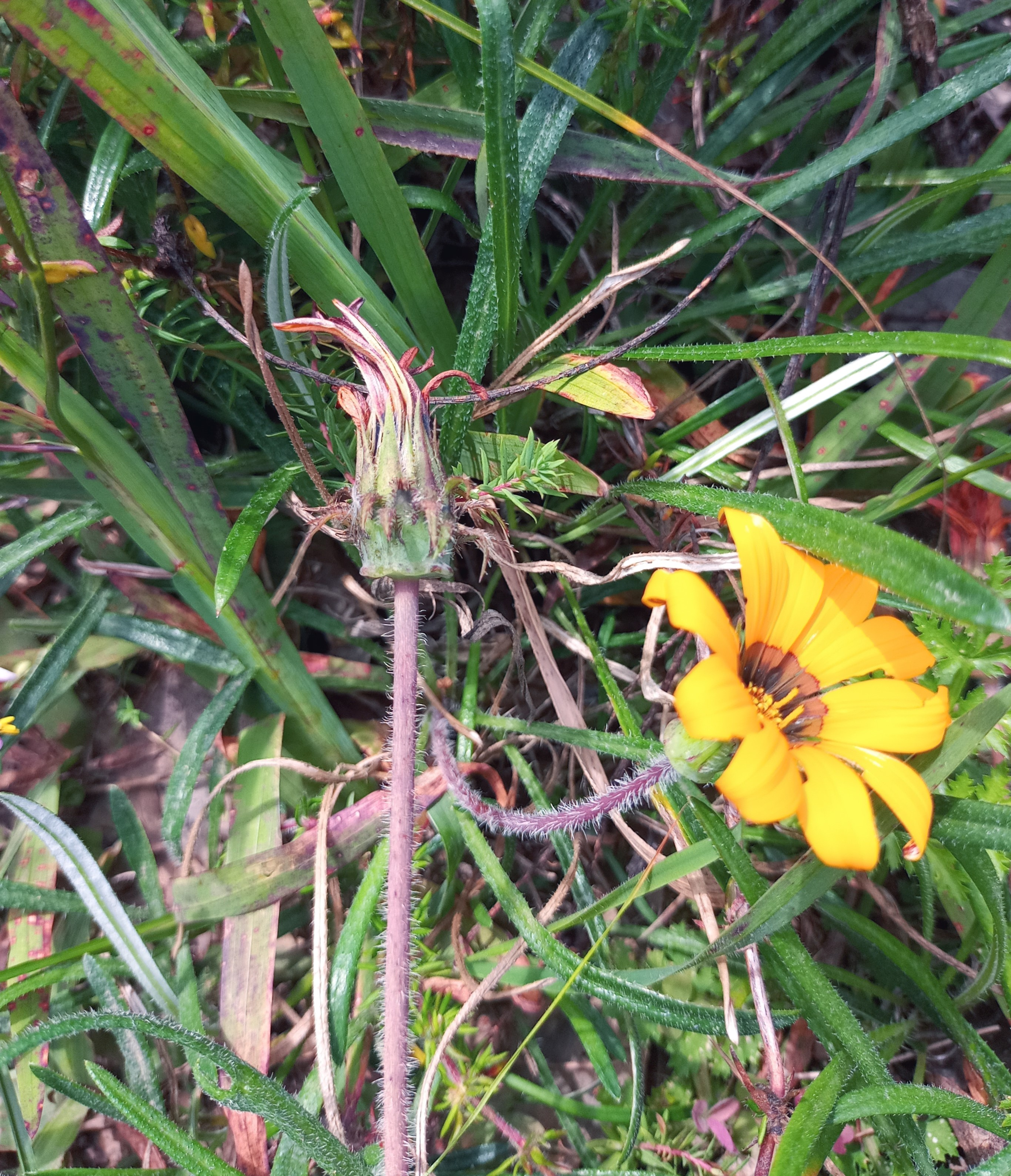

Scientific classification
- Kingdom: Plantae
- Clade: Tracheophytes
- Clade: Angiosperms
- Clade: Eudicots
- Clade: Asterids
- Order: Asterales
- Family: Asteraceae
- Genus: Gazania
- Species: G. ciliaris

Binomial name
- Gazania ciliaris DC.

= Gazania ciliaris =

Species of plant

Gazania ciliaris is a species of flowering plant in the family Asteraceae, native predominantly to the Western Cape province, South Africa, where it occurs from Vanrhynsdorp to the Eastern Cape near Joubertina.

== Description ==
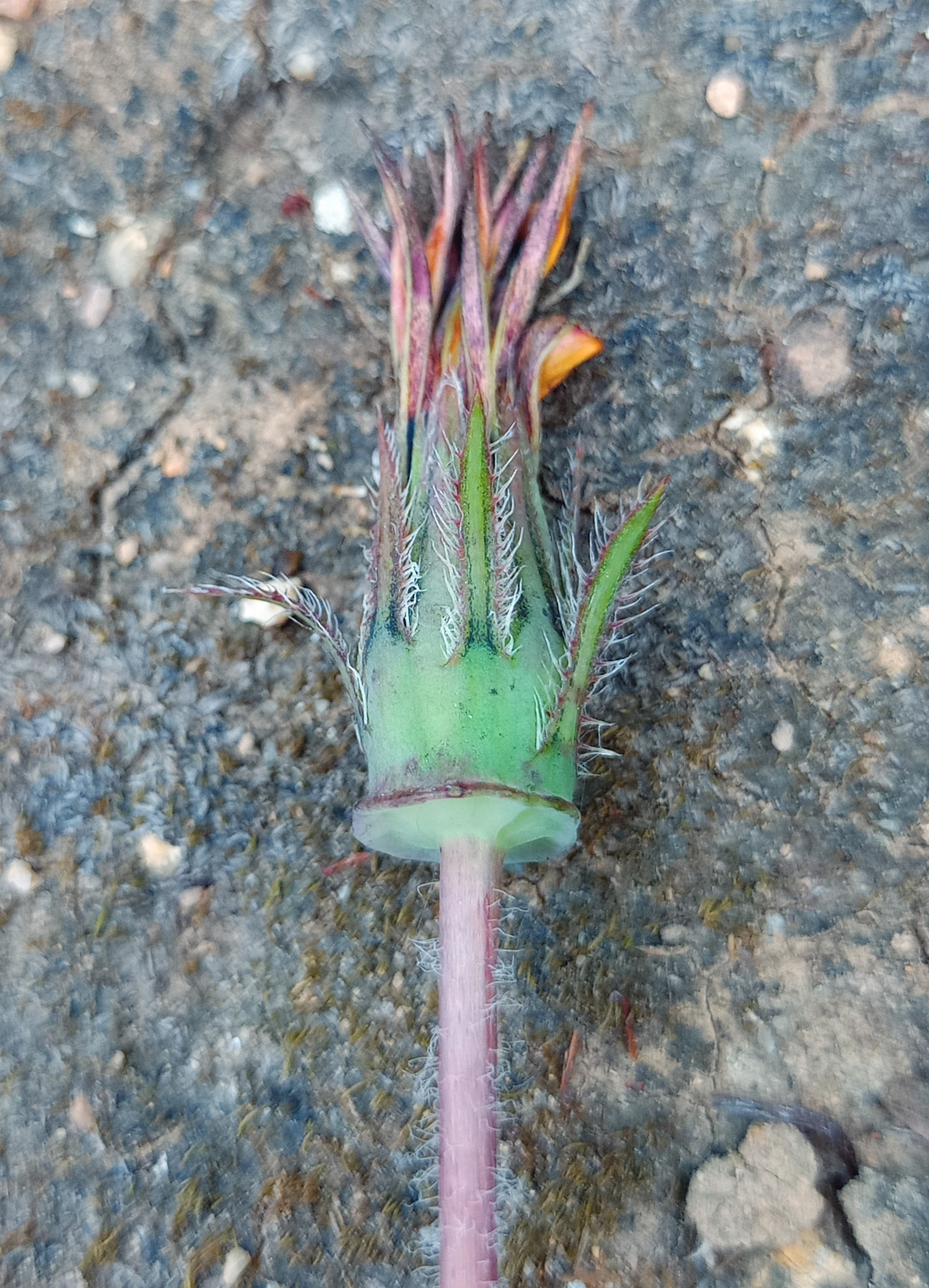
Gazania ciliaris involucre with its distinctively truncate base, and ciliate outer bracts

The flowers are variable in colour (usually yellow-to-orange), and born on distinctively setose-to-ciliate (hairy) petioles. The flower's involucre is glabrous and a sub-cylindrical shape, with a distinctive fleshy truncate base.

The involucre bracts/scales are a distinguishing characteristics of this species. At the top of the involucre, it usually has two or three rows of terminal scales. These are finely acuminate and the margins of the inner row are distinctly ciliate. Along the length of the involucre, it can also have several parietal scales, which are usually deltoid acuminate and somewhat arranged in a row around the involucre (a characteristic shared with Gazania linearis).

The leaves are linear or linear-lanceolate, and can be either simple or pinnate. The upper leaf surface is usually rough and the lower surface is tomentose (white woolly). There are usually distinctive spine-like cilia/hairs along the lower leaf margins.

In its growth form, G. ciliaris is a compact herbaceous perennial, and forms basal rosettes with only relatively short stems. The bases of old dead leaves usually do not persist around the stem as they do in Gazania linearis.
