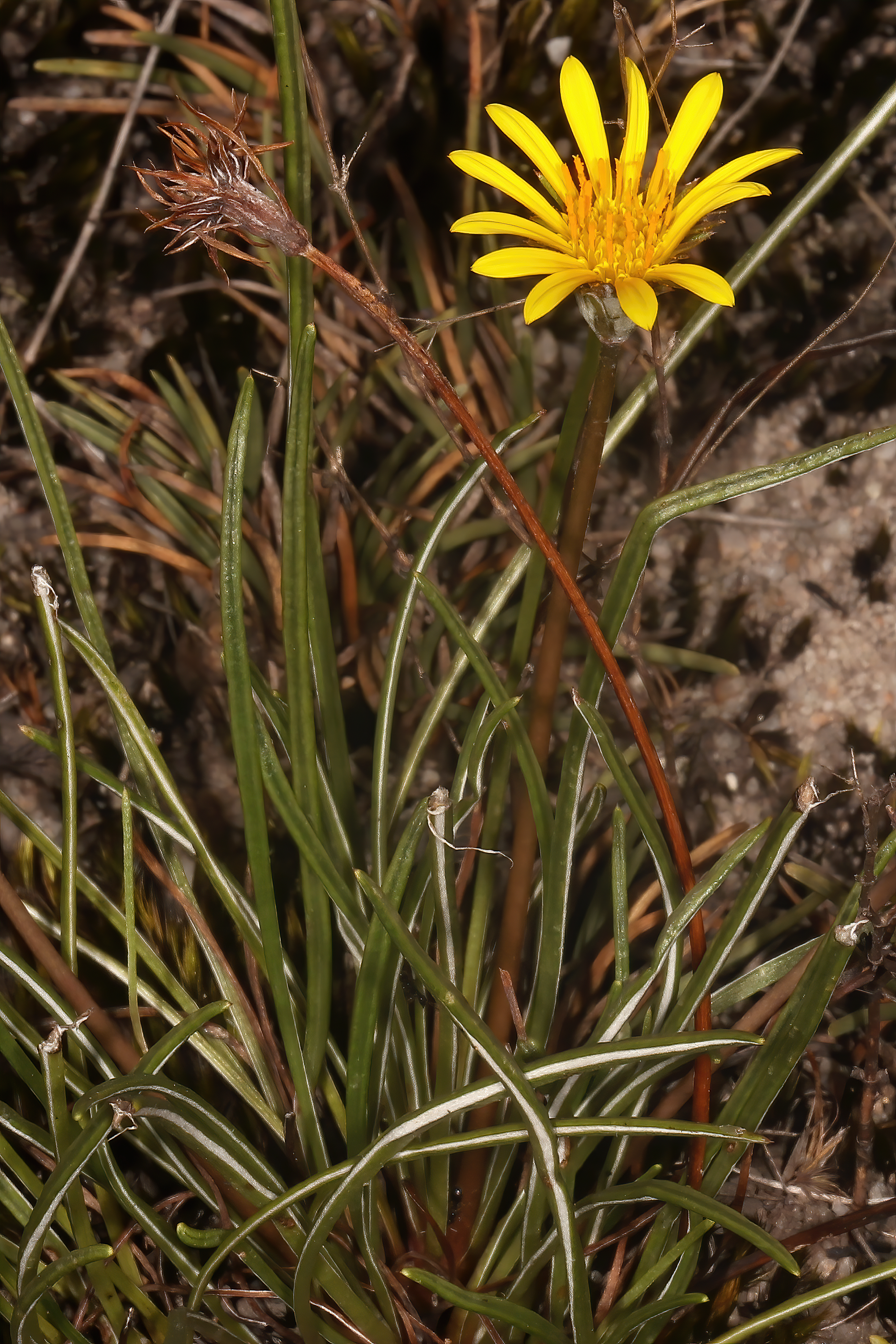
- The flowers of Gazania linearis are plain yellow, sometimes with dark spots at the base of the ray florets.

Scientific classification
- Kingdom: Plantae
- Clade: Tracheophytes
- Clade: Angiosperms
- Clade: Eudicots
- Clade: Asterids
- Order: Asterales
- Family: Asteraceae
- Genus: Gazania
- Species: G. linearis

Binomial name
- Gazania linearis (Thunb.) Druce

Synonyms
- Arctotis staticefolia Poir.; Gazania kraussii Sch.Bip.; Gazania longiscapa DC.; Gazania multijuga DC.; Gazania pinnata var. multijuga (DC.) Harv.; Gazania stenophylla Auct.; Gazania subulata R.Br.; Gorteria linearis Thunb.

= Gazania linearis =

Species of flowering plant

Gazania linearis is a species of flowering plant in the family Asteraceae, with thin linear leaves, native to South Africa.

== Description ==
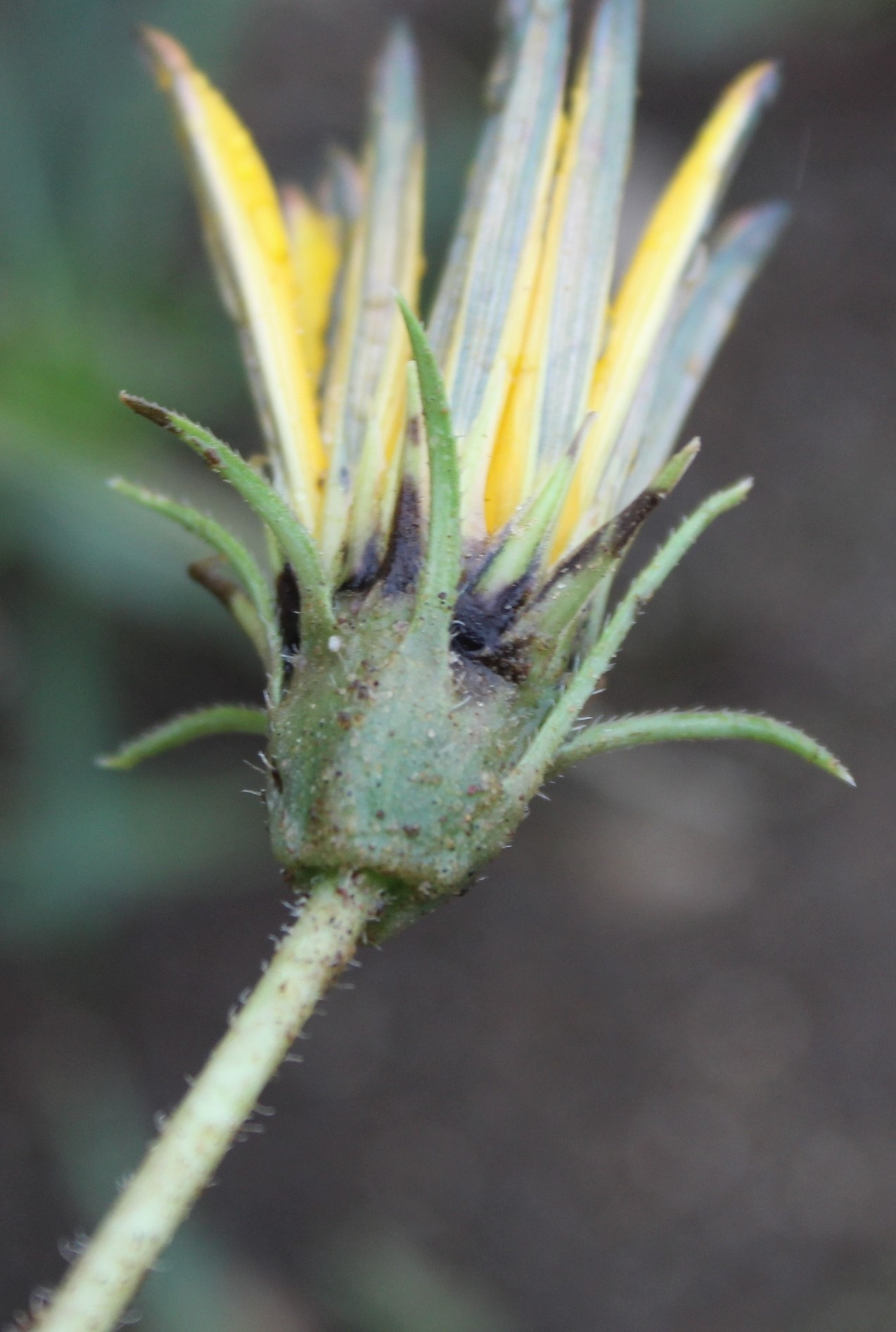
The involucre of Gazania linearis var linearis, Eastern Cape, South Africa. Like many other Gazania species, the undersides of the ray florets can have longitudinal stripes.

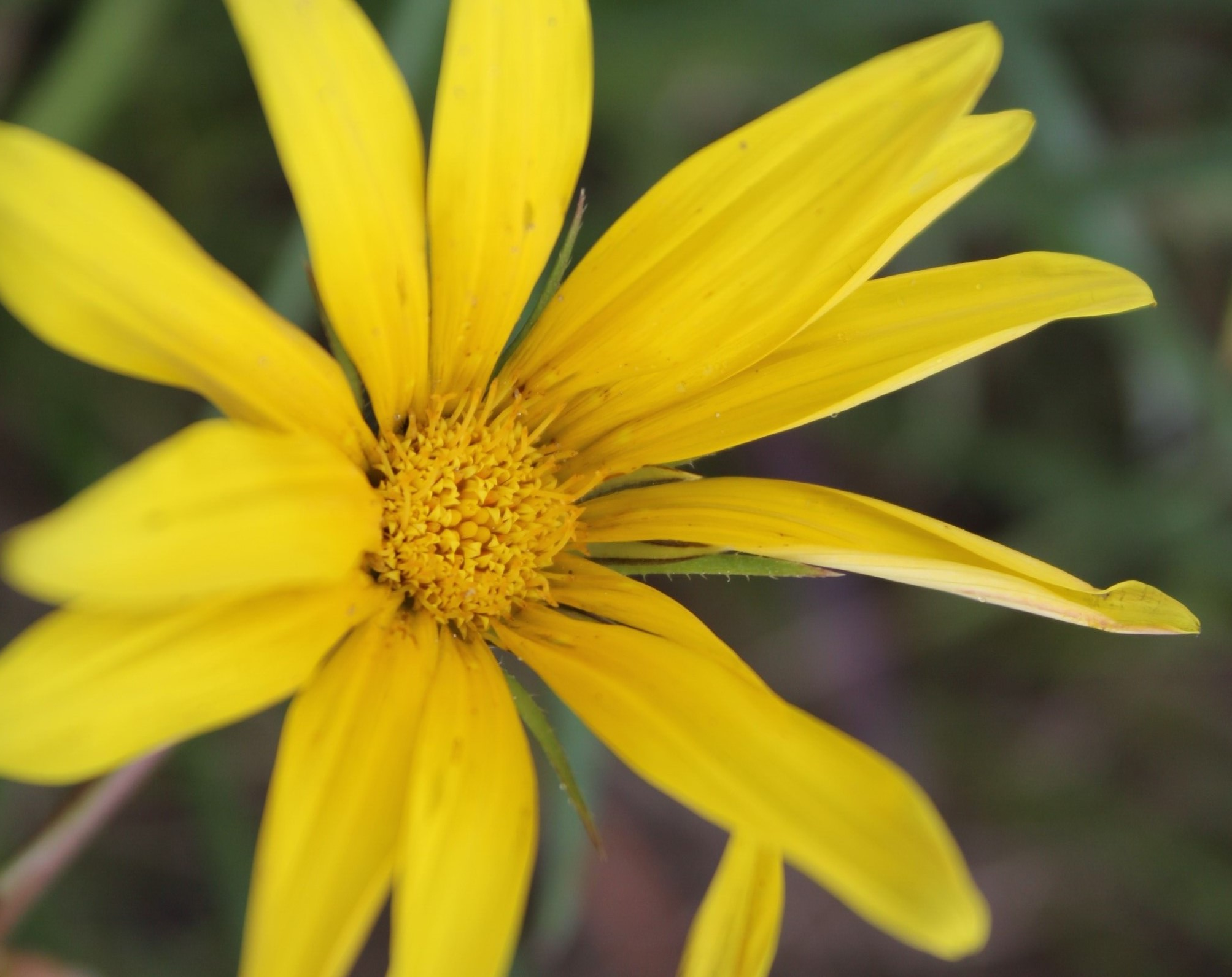
The flowerheads of Gazania linearis are yellow above, without stripes or lines, though sometimes with small dark spots near the bases of the ray florets.

Gazania linearis is a clumping perennial herb. The leaves are usually slender and linear in shape, and are usually simple (but can sometimes also be slightly pinnate). The lower leaf margins are rough and spiny-to-ciliate. The upper leaf surface is dull green while the undersides are white woolly/tomentose. The leaves have long, winged petioles and form basal rosettes at the ground around the short branching stem. (Unlike the type variety of G. linearis, which has linear leaves, the rare variety G. linearis var. ovalis has more oval shaped leaves. It is however only known from a small area near Grahamstown.)

The plant produces large, solitary daisy-like flower-heads that are invariably bright yellow. The ray florets may have dark spots near the bases, curl upwards along their edges, and close at night. The involucre is subcupuliform or obtusely bell-shaped (campanulate) in shape. Both the involucre and scape can be glabrous or setose. There are usually some parietal bracts arranged around the involucre. Of the terminal involucre bracts, the outer row is linear with setose-ciliate margins, while the inner row is acuminate with membranous-entire margins. The fruit is a tiny achene covered in very long hairs several times the length of the fruit body.

=== Diagnostic characters ===
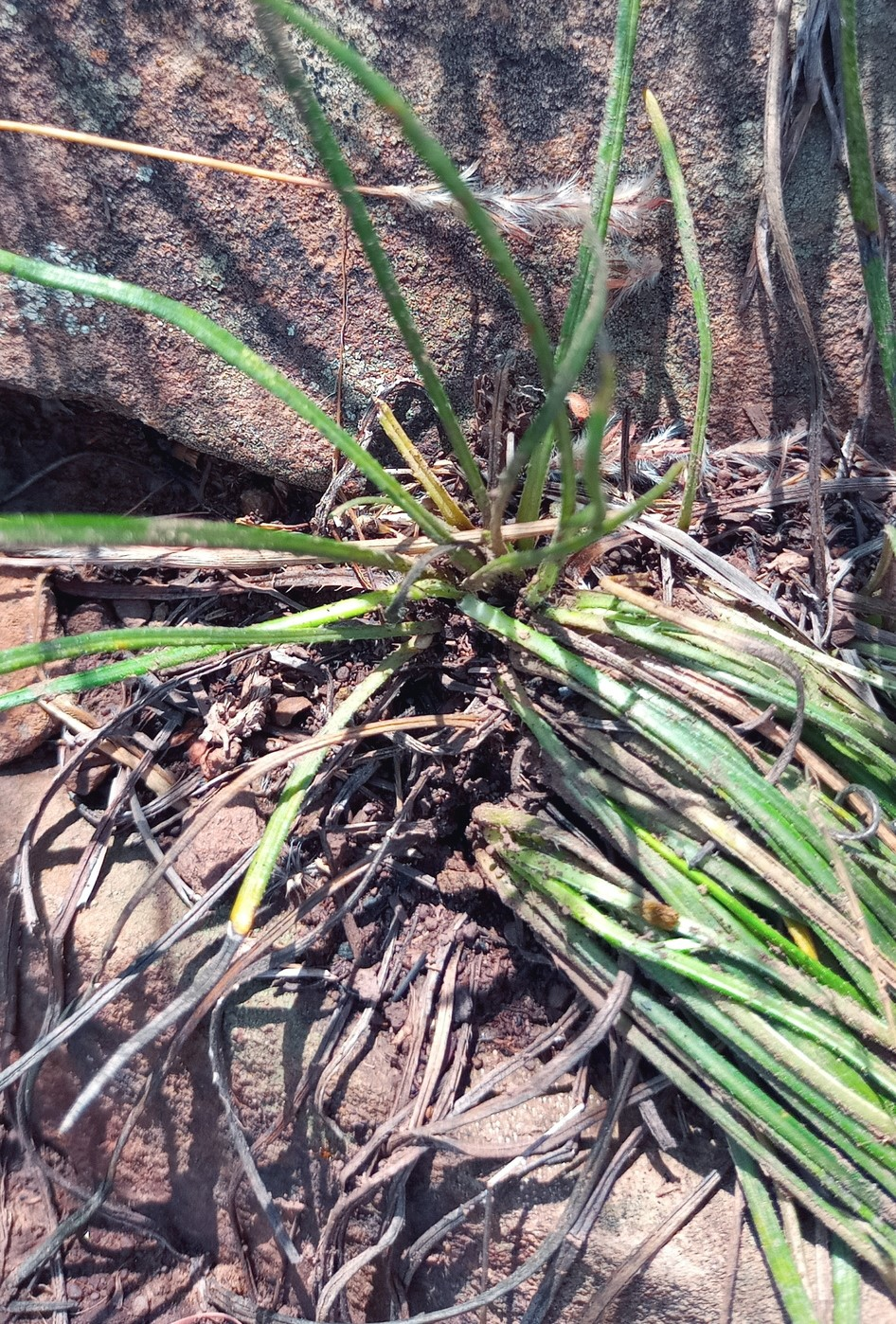
The leaves of Gazania linearis var linearis are slender, linear, with rough-to-ciliate lower leaf margins. Old dead leaves persist around the base of the rosette.

Gazania linearis is very similar in its morphology to Gazania krebsiana, Gazania ciliaris, Gazania pectinata, Gazania rigida and others. It is partially distinguished from other Gazania species by a mixture of several characteristics:

- Unlike Gazania krebsiana, the Gazania linearis outer terminal row of involucre bracts has minutely ciliate margins. The sympatric populations of Gazania krebsiana tend to have involucres and bracts that are all uniformly smooth (not hairy or ciliate).
- Unlike Gazania krebsiana, Gazania pectinata, Gazania rigida and many other species, the Gazania linearis involucre usually has parietal scales/bracts in at least one clear row around its involucre, in addition to the usual rows of terminal scales/bracts around the tip of its involucre.
- Unlike Gazania ciliaris, the Gazania linearis petioles are not ciliate, its involucre base is slightly intrusive, and the bases of the old dead leaves often persist around the lower stem.

== Distribution and ecology ==
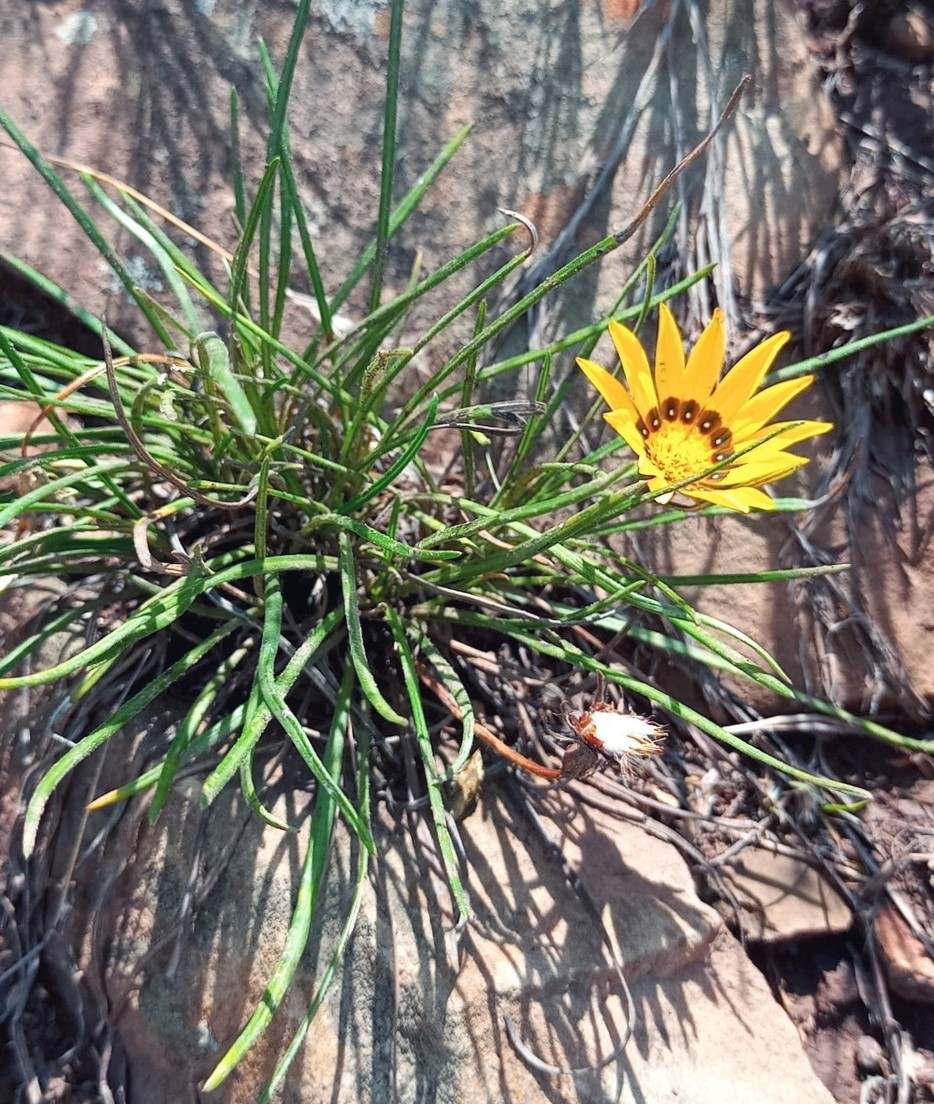
Gazania linearis var linearis in habitat, near Queenstown in South Africa. This specimen's flowerhead has dark spots at the bases of its ray florets.

Gazania linearis var. linearis (with linear leaves) is indigenous to the southern and eastern parts of South Africa, where it occurs from the Eastern Cape (Humansdorp) in the west, eastwards to KwaZulu-Natal Province.

Gazania linearis var. ovalis (with more oval-shaped leaves) is restricted to a small area near Grahamstown, in the Eastern Cape.

Mixed Gazania cultivars, sometimes identified as G. linearis, have also taken hold as an introduced species in other parts of the world with similar climates, such as in California and New Mexico in the United States; Australia; and New Zealand, where they have been classified as a weed. The plants typically grow on grassy and rocky hillsides. They are also classified as invasive in some areas, including California.
