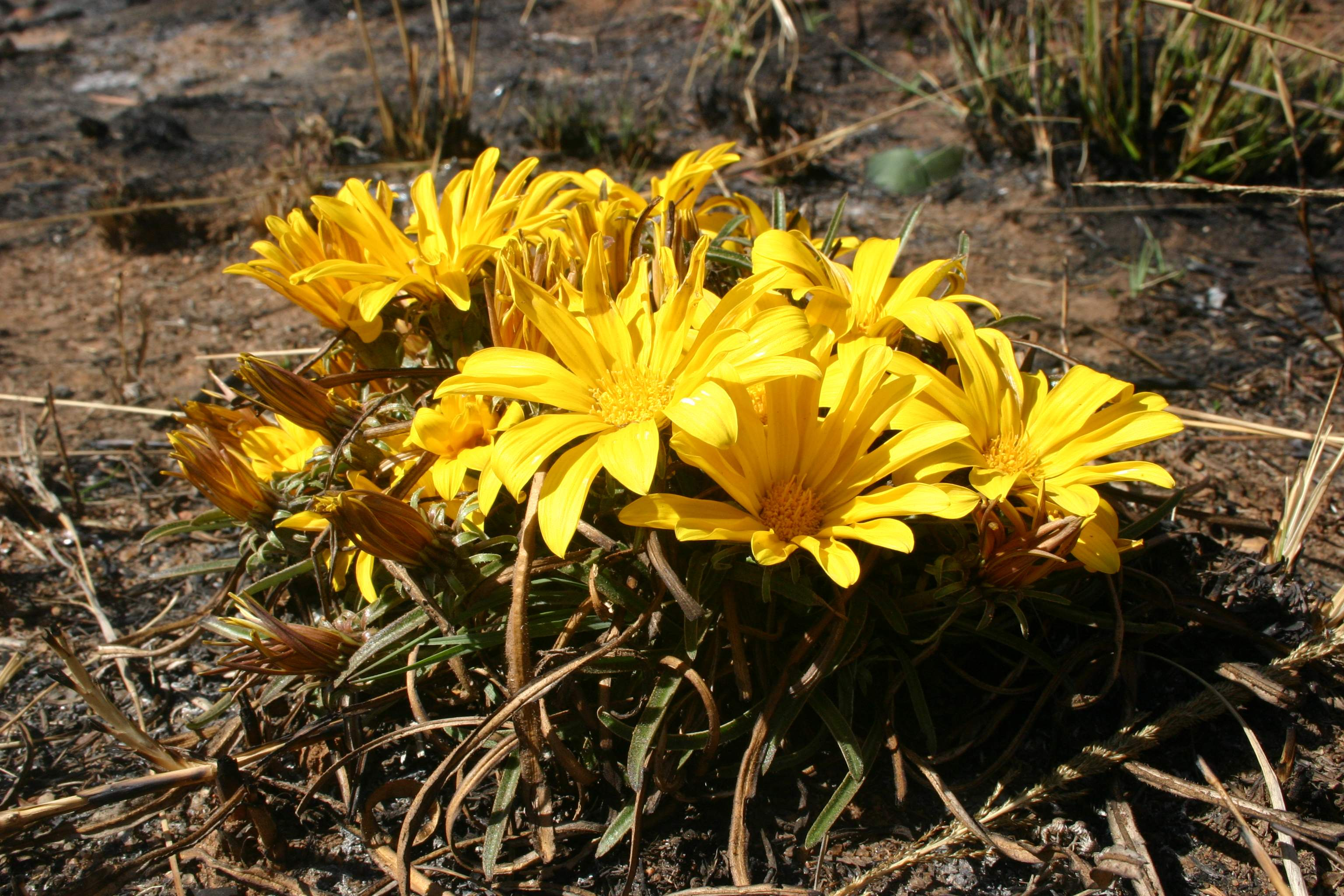
- Gazania krebsiana subsp. serrulata growing near Johannesburg, South Africa.

Scientific classification
- Kingdom: Plantae
- Clade: Tracheophytes
- Clade: Angiosperms
- Clade: Eudicots
- Clade: Asterids
- Order: Asterales
- Family: Asteraceae
- Genus: Gazania
- Species: G. krebsiana

Binomial name
- Gazania krebsiana Less.

= Gazania krebsiana =

Species of flowering plant

Gazania krebsiana is a species of flowering plant in family Asteraceae. It is a low-growing herbaceous perennial native to Southern Africa, ranging from Angola, Zambia, and Mozambique to South Africa. It is one of some 19 species of Gazania that are exclusively African and predominantly South African - only Gazania krebsiana subsp. serrulata (DC.) Roessler ventures northwards from the Transvaal into tropical Africa.

== Description ==
This ground-hugging grassland species is one of the first plants to flower in spring, appearing in profusion as small clumps of yellow or white flowers between low grass tussocks or burnt stubble, or as leafless single flowers seemingly stuck into the soil. Flowering lasts for only a few weeks after the first rains. The buttercup-yellow rays often occur in forms having dark spots at the base. The showy flowers open only in strong sunlight, closing with fading light and re-opening the following day. This plant is perennial and grows from a woody rootstock. The leaves are tufted and linear in shape, white-felted on the underside, and exuding a milky latex when damaged.

Gazania krebsiana is very similar to a number of other Gazania species, including Gazania rigida, Gazania pectinata and Gazania linearis among others. Species boundaries between these are not clear, and they are frequently confused in practice.

=== Subspecies ===
First described by Christian Friedrich Lessing in 1832, 3 subspecies are recognised. They can usually be distinguished by using a combination of two diagnostic characters: the shape of their leaves and the shape of the inner row of terminal involucre bracts:

- G. krebsiana subsp. serrulata. This subspecies is indigenous to grassland habitat across the eastern parts of southern Africa, and as far north-east as Tanzania.
  - The leaves are all undivided/entire.
  - The inner row of terminal involucre bracts are +- obtuse or subacute, and 3-4(-5) mm long.
- G. krebsiana subsp. arctotoides. This subspecies is indigenous to most of the southern and western parts of southern Africa, occurring widely through the Cape, Free State, Natal, Lesotho, and in Namibia.
  - At least some (if not all) of the leaves are pinnate.
  - The inner row of terminal involucre bracts are +- obtuse or subacute, and 3-5 mm long (similar to subsp. serrulata).
- G. krebsiana subsp. krebsiana. The type subspecies is widespread across South Africa.
  - The leaf shape is variable.
  - The inner row of terminal involucre bracts are acuminate, and 4-6(-8) mm long

=== Cultivation ===
Gazanias have become popular garden subjects, especially in Europe because of their hardiness, and horticultural breeding has led to numerous cultivars with large flower-heads and a variety of colours. Decoctions and infusions of the plant are used as analgesics (pain relief) by Bantu tribes.

== Taxonomic history of the genus ==
The genus Gazania was established by Joseph Gaertner in 1791 in his monumental work De Fructibus et Seminibus Plantarum. Two possible sources for the name are Theodore of Gaza who translated the Greek botanical works of Theophrastus into Latin, thereby laying the foundation of modern botany, and 'gaza', the Greek word for 'riches'. The specific name 'krebsiana' honours the German naturalist and apothecary, Georg Ludwig Engelhard Krebs (1792—1844), who collected natural history specimens in South Africa on behalf of the Berlin Zoological Museum (in the present day the Berlin's Natural History Museum).

The noted taxonomist N. E. Brown observed that the genus is one of the most perplexing a botanist may deal with - the foliage within a species may be extremely variable, and the involucral bracts are extraordinarily diverse in shape and placement. Burchell came across the species a number of times between 1811 and 1814, but it seems to have reached Europe only as late as 1893 through a Mr. Max Leichtlin from Baden-Baden, and oddly in the same year through a Mr. Gumbleton, who had received seeds from a Mr. Adlam in Natal.

== Gallery ==
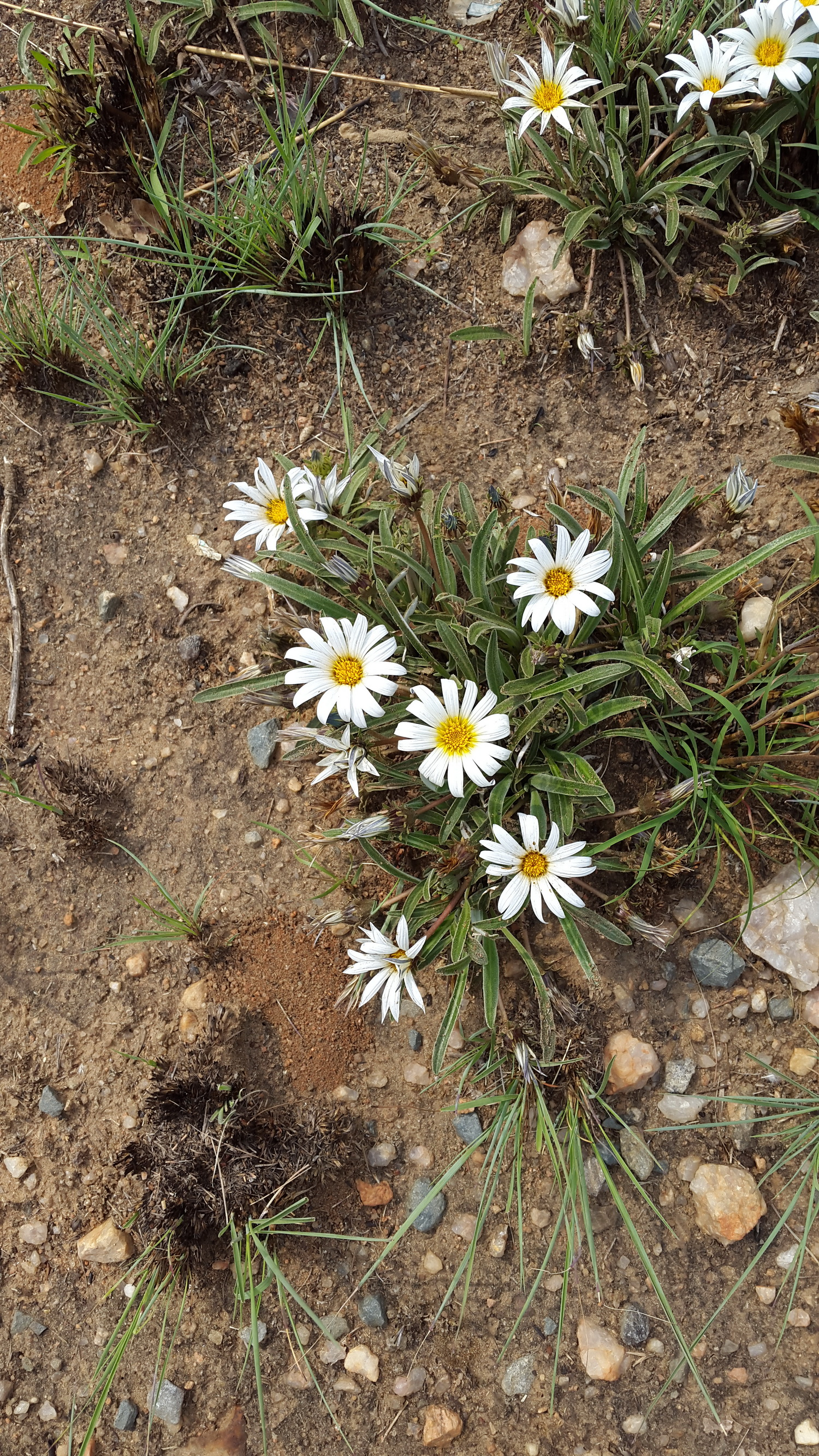

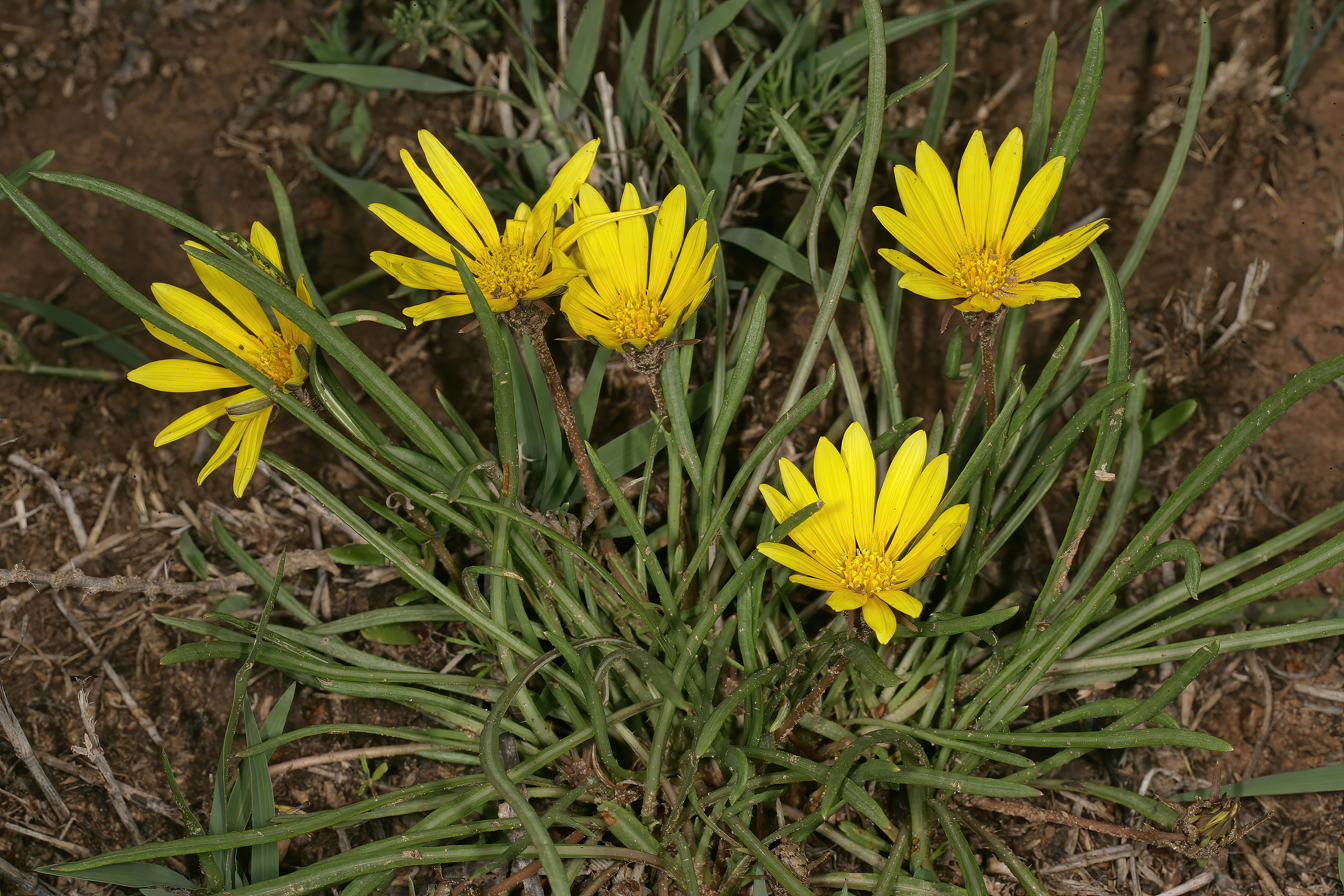

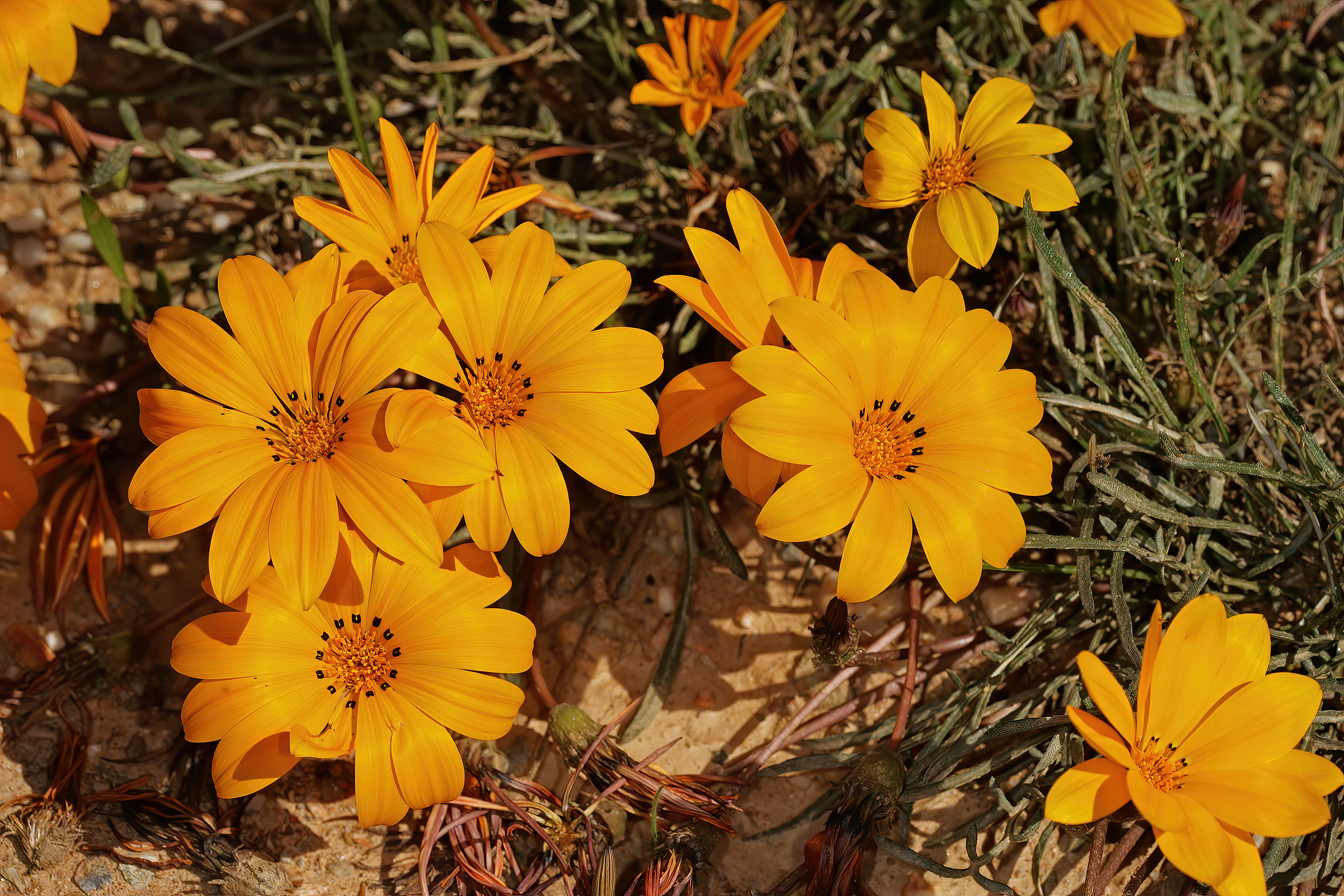
