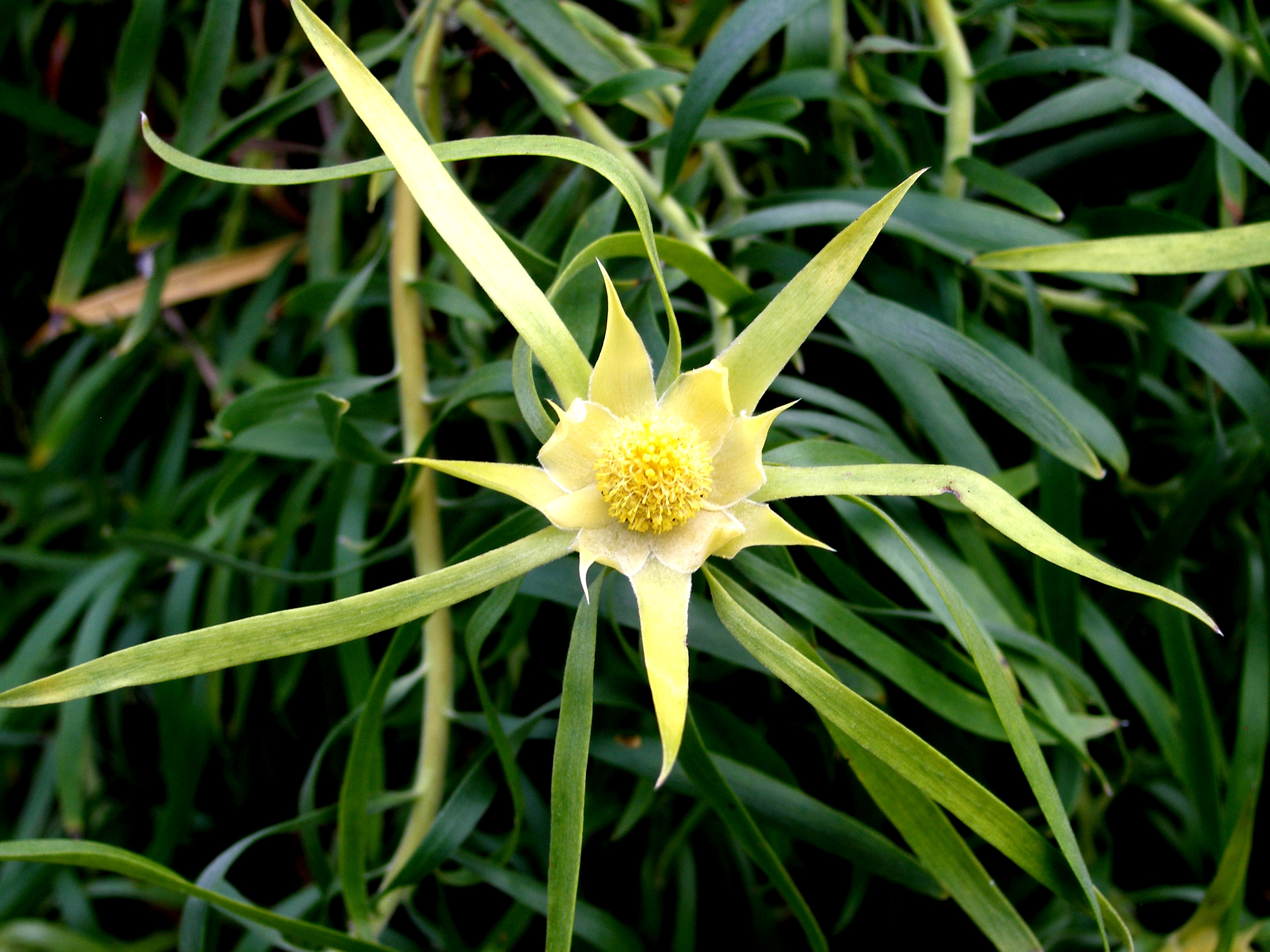

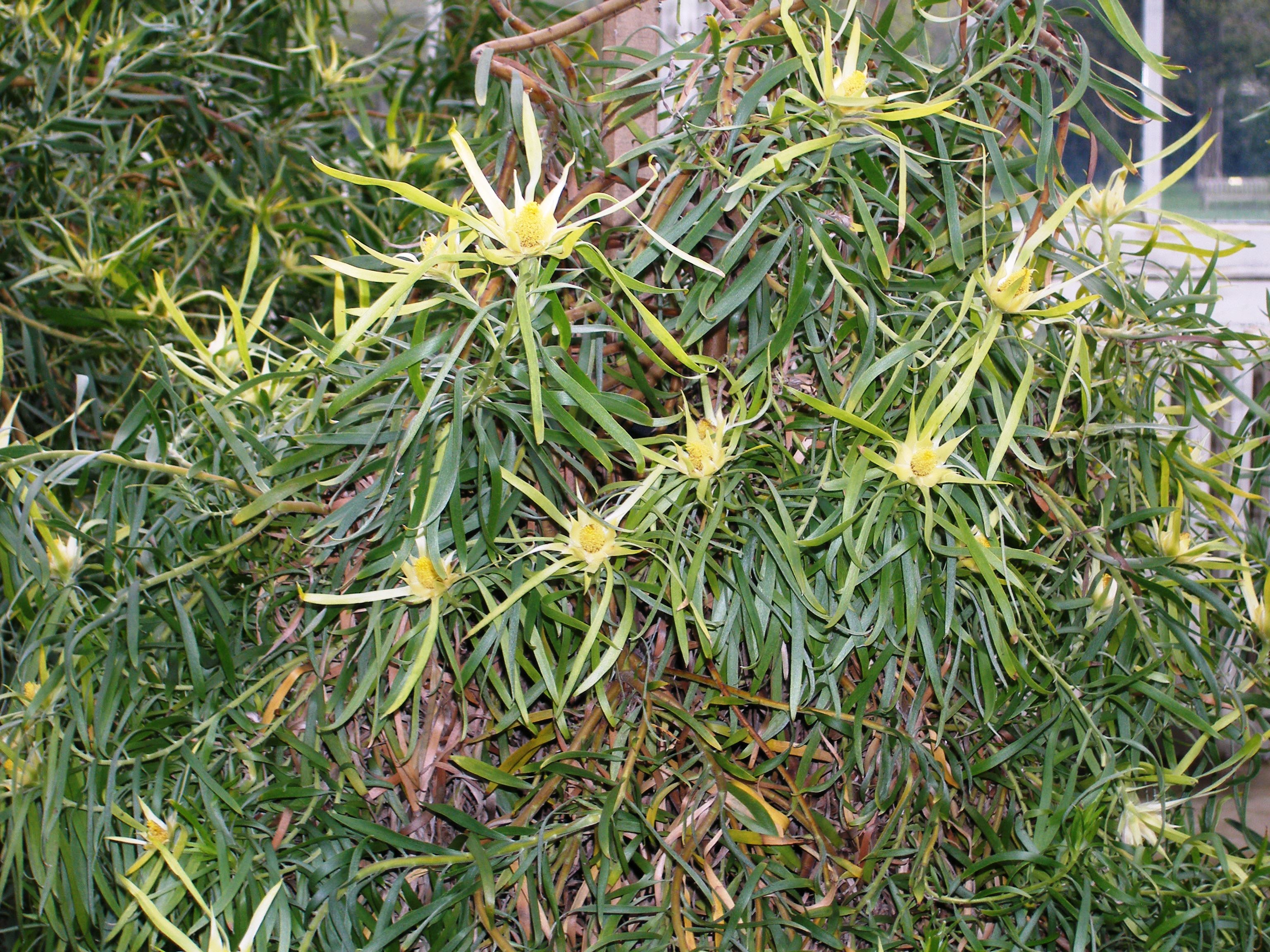

Conservation status
- Least Concern (IUCN 3.1)

Scientific classification
- Kingdom: Plantae
- Clade: Tracheophytes
- Clade: Angiosperms
- Clade: Eudicots
- Order: Proteales
- Family: Proteaceae
- Genus: Leucadendron
- Species: L. eucalyptifolium

Binomial name
- Leucadendron eucalyptifolium H.Buek ex Meisn.

= Leucadendron eucalyptifolium =

Species of plant

Leucadendron eucalyptifolium, the gum-leaved conebush, is a flower-bearing shrub belonging to the genus Leucadendron and forms part of the fynbos. The plant is native to the Western Cape and the Eastern Cape, where it occurs in the Potberg, Riversdal Plains, Langeberg, Outeniqua Mountains, Tsitsikamma Mountains, Kouga Mountains, Elandsberg, Swartberg, Waboomsberg, Warmwaterberg, Touwsberg, Rooiberg and Soetwaterberg. The shrub grows 4 m tall and bears flowers from July to October.

Fire destroys the plant but the seeds survive. The seeds are stored in a toll on the female plant and are released after a fire where they are then spread by the wind. The plant is unisexual and there are male and female plants. The activities of small beetles ensure that the plants are pollinated. The plant grows mainly in sandstone sand at altitudes of 160 – 1400 m.

The tree's national number is 81.
