= Karl Heinrich Bergius =

German scientist (1790–1818)

Karl Heinrich Bergius (1790–1818), also known as Carl Heinrich Bergius, was a Prussian botanist, naturalist, cavalryman and pharmacist from Küstrin. He is notable for his natural history collecting in southern Africa.

Bergius served as a cavalryman in the Prussian campaign of the Napoleonic Wars, for which he was awarded the Iron Cross. He subsequently studied pharmacy in Berlin where his botanical interests were noted by Martin Lichtenstein at the Berlin Zoological Museum. Lichtenstein encouraged him to go to the Cape Colony of southern Africa to work as an assistant pharmacist in Cape Town, where he arrived in 1815, in order to make natural history collections for the Berlin Museum.

He died in isolation and poverty in Cape Town in January 1818 of pulmonary tuberculosis, abandoned by even Mund and Maire with whom he had served in the Prussian Army. He is commemorated in the scientific name of the greater crested tern, Thalasseus bergii, as well as in the names of the plants Diascia bergiana Link & Otto, Ficinia bergiana Kunth and Ophioglossum bergianum Schltdl. Sutton, D.A.
