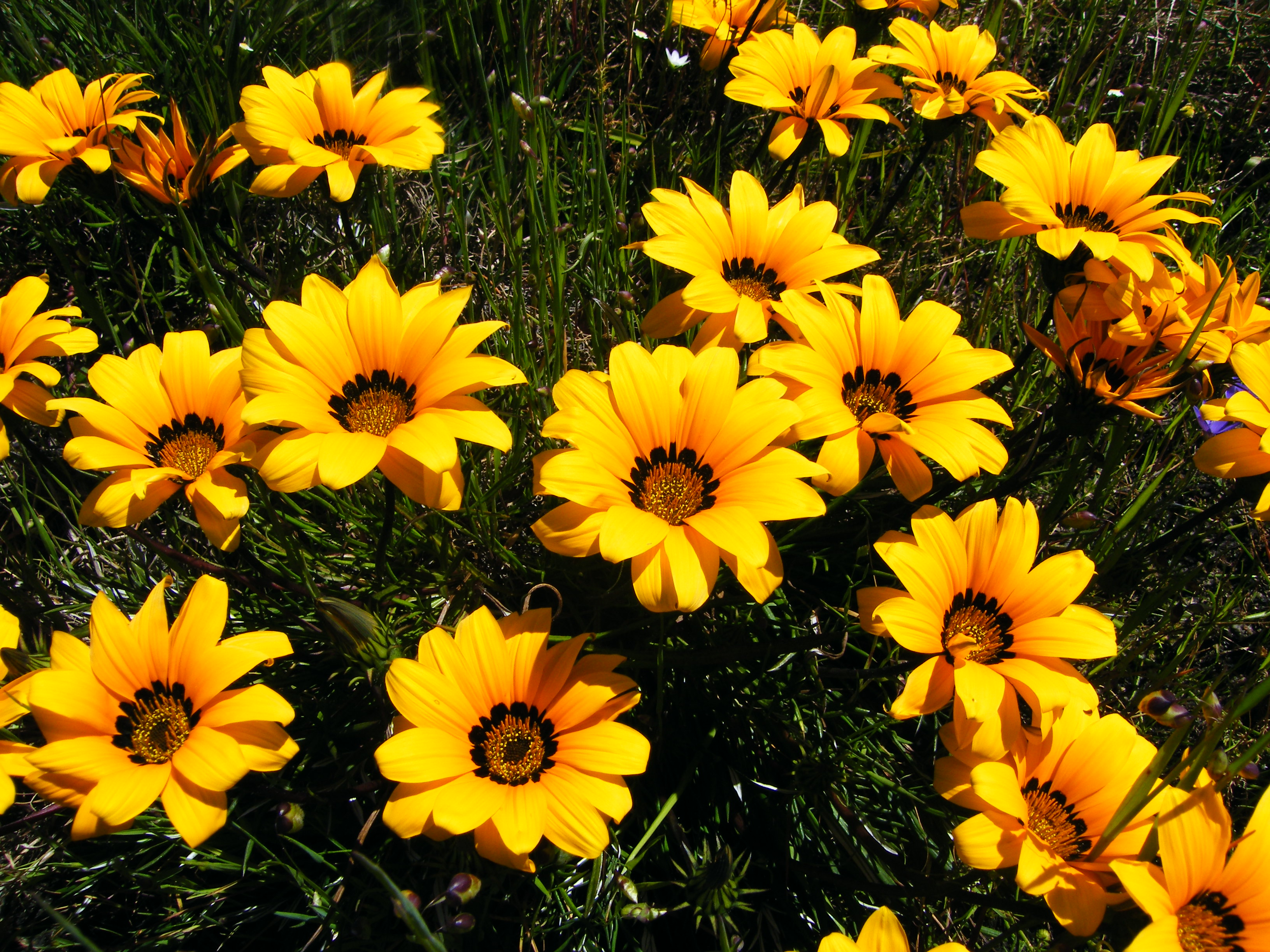

Scientific classification
- Kingdom: Plantae
- Clade: Embryophytes
- Clade: Tracheophytes
- Clade: Spermatophytes
- Clade: Angiosperms
- Clade: Eudicots
- Clade: Asterids
- Order: Asterales
- Family: Asteraceae
- Genus: Gazania
- Species: G. pectinata

Binomial name
- Gazania pectinata (Thunb.) Hartw.

= Gazania pectinata =

Species of plant

Gazania pectinata, the cockscomb gazania, is a species of flowering plant in the family Asteraceae, native to the lower-lying regions and coastal plains of the Western Cape Province, South Africa.

== Description ==
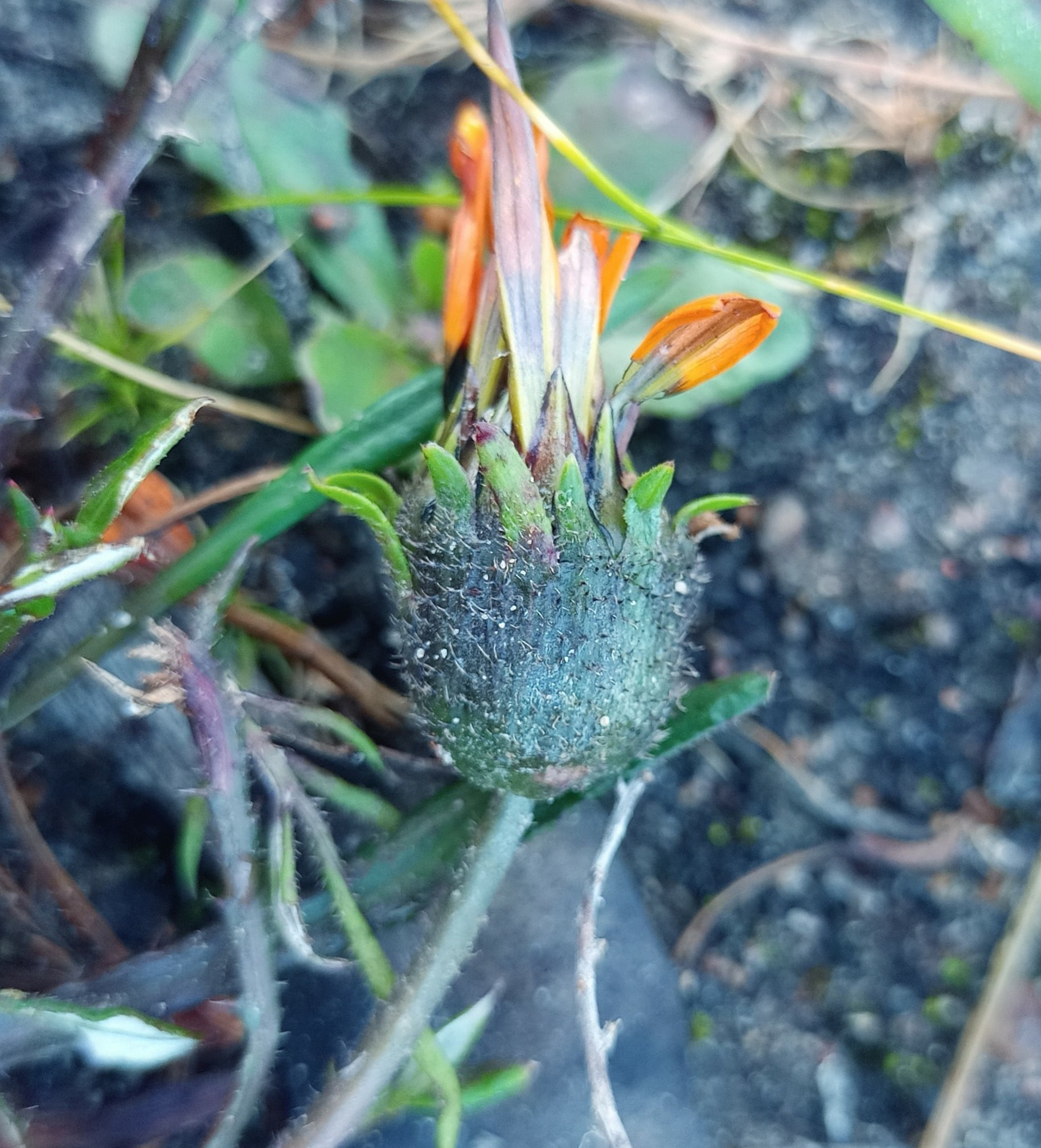
The involucre of Gazania pectinata is usually bell-shaped and hairy

The flowers are yellow-to-orange, usually with black-to-brown spots, and born on long, glabrous-to-setose scapes. The involucre is also glabrous-to-setose and obtusely bell-shaped (campanulate), with a base that is broadly/obtusely connate. Along the length of the involucre are a number of parietal involucre scales/bracts, which are oblong in shape and arranged irregularly.

The leaves are long and slender (linear-lanceolate), with acute tips, and usually pinnate or more rarely simple. The leaves have smooth upper surfaces and woolly (tomentose) lower surfaces.

In its growth form, G. pectinata is an annual (sometimes a perennial) and forms basal rosettes with only relatively short stems.

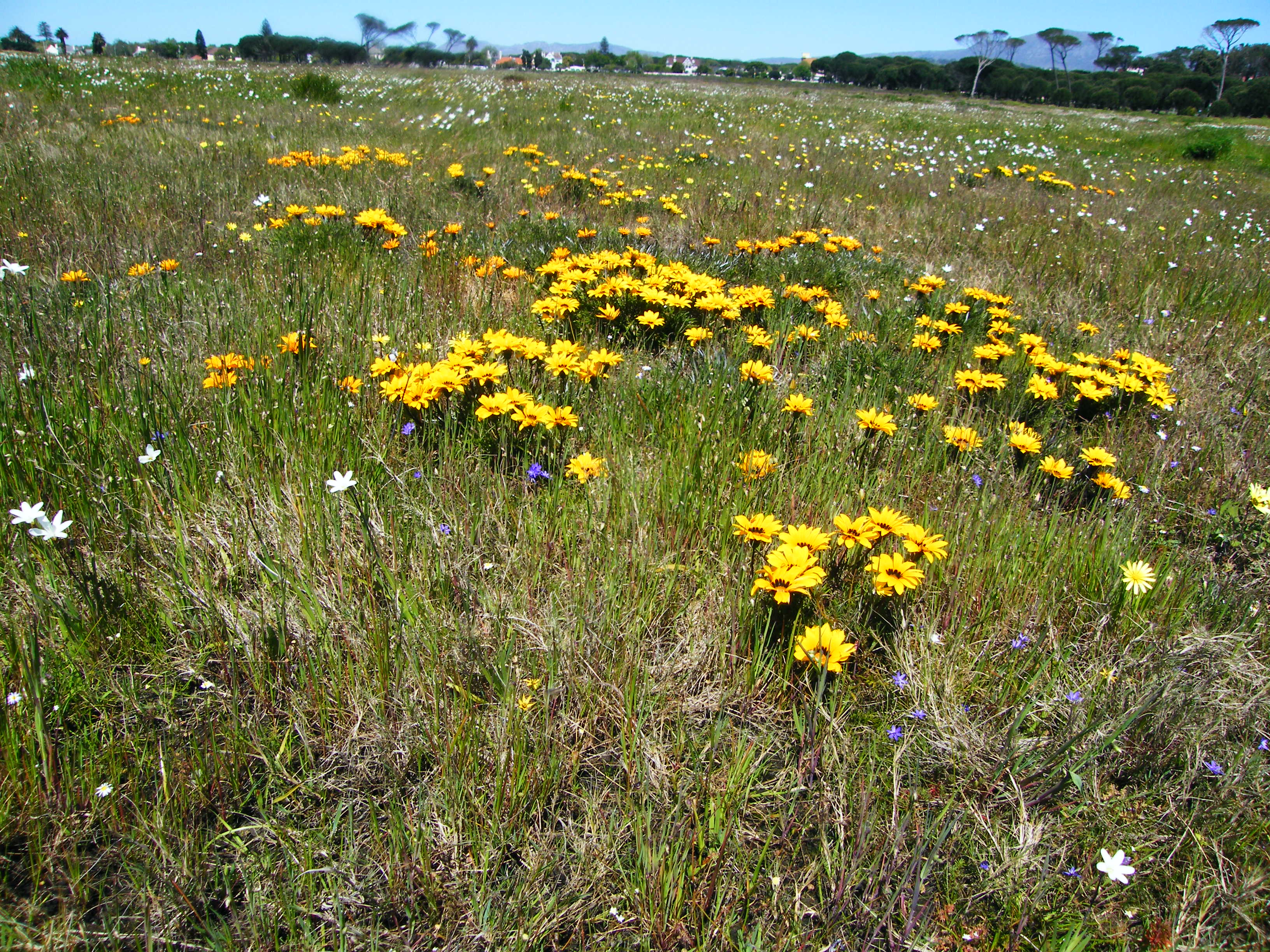
Gazania pectinata in habitat in Cape Town.

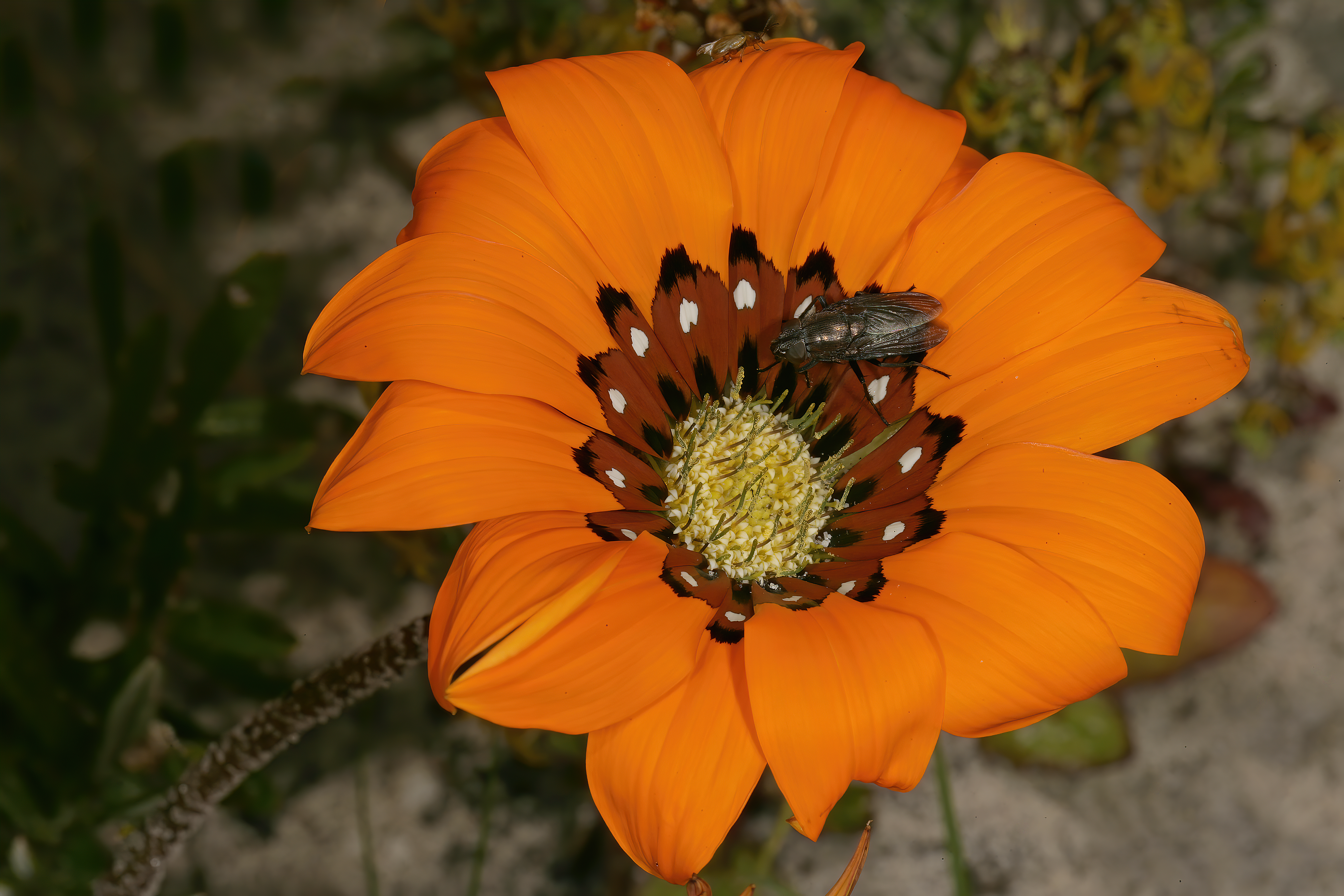
