= Taxis =

Directed movement of a motile cell or organism in response to an external stimulus

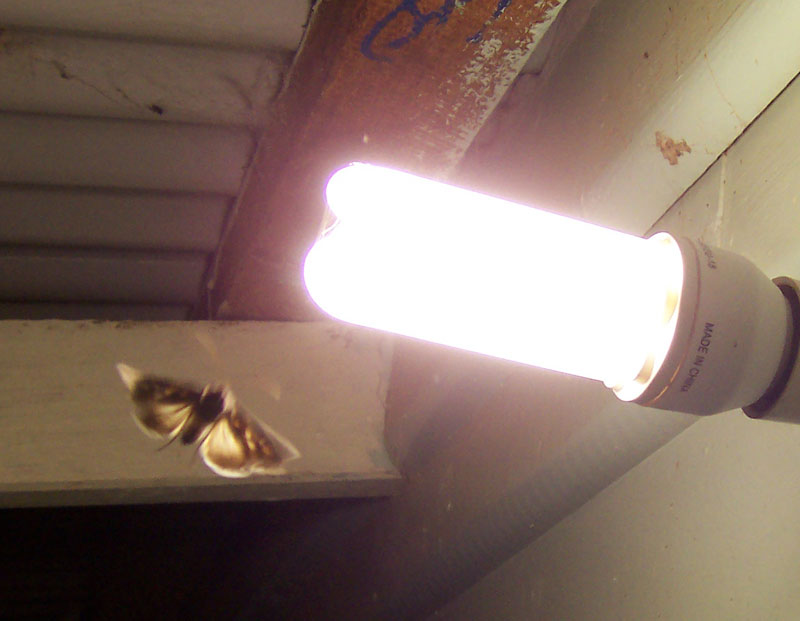
A moth exhibiting phototaxis, moving towards a source of light

A taxis (from Ancient Greek τάξις (táxis) 'arrangement, order'; pl.: taxes /ˈtæksiːz/) is the movement of an organism in response to a stimulus such as light or the presence of food. Taxes are innate behavioural responses.

A taxis differs from a tropism (turning response, often growth towards or away from a stimulus) in that in the case of taxis, the organism has motility and demonstrates guided movement towards or away from the stimulus source. It is sometimes distinguished from a kinesis, a non-directional change in activity in response to a stimulus. Taxis can be positive (moving towards the stimulus) or negative (moving away from the stimulus).

== Classification ==
Taxes are classified based on the type of stimulus, and on whether the organism's response is to move towards or away from the stimulus. If the organism moves towards the stimulus the taxis are positive, while if it moves away the taxis are negative. For example, flagellate protozoans of the genus Euglena move towards a light source. This reaction or behavior is called positive phototaxis since phototaxis refers to a response to light and the organism is moving towards the stimulus.

=== Terminology derived from type of stimulus ===
Many types of taxis have been identified, including:

- Aerotaxis (stimulation by oxygen)
- Anemotaxis (by wind)
- Barotaxis (by pressure)
- Chemotaxis or "gradient search" (by chemicals)
- Durotaxis (by stiffness)
- Electrotaxis or galvanotaxis (by electric current)
- Gravitaxis or geotaxis (by gravity)
- Hydrotaxis (by moisture)
- Magnetotaxis (by magnetic field)
- Phototaxis (by light)
- Rheotaxis (by fluid flow)
- Thermotaxis (by changes in temperature)
- Thigmotaxis (by physical contact)

Depending on the type of sensory organs present, a taxis can be classified as a klinotaxis, where an organism continuously samples the environment to determine the direction of a stimulus; a tropotaxis, where bilateral sense organs are used to determine the stimulus direction; and a telotaxis, where a single organ suffices to establish the orientation of the stimulus.

=== Terminology derived from taxis direction ===
There are five types of taxes based on the movement of organisms.

- Klinotaxis occurs in organisms with receptor cells but not paired receptor organs. The cells for reception may be located all over the body, but often towards the anterior side. The organism detects the stimuli by turning its head sideways and comparing the intensity of the stimulus. Their direction of movement is then based on the stronger stimulus, either moving toward a desirable stimulus or away from an undesired one. When the intensity of stimuli is balanced equally from all sides, the organism moves in a straight line. The movement of blowfly and butterfly larvae clearly demonstrates klinotaxis.
- Tropotaxis is displayed by organisms with paired receptor cells, comparing the strength of the signals and turning toward the strongest signal. The movement of grayling butterflies and fish lice clearly demonstrates tropotaxis.
- Telotaxis also requires paired receptors. The movement occurs along the direction where the intensity of the stimuli is stronger. Telotaxis is clearly seen in the movement of bees when they leave their hive to look for food. They balance the stimuli from the sun as well as from flowers but land on the flower whose stimulus is most intense for them.
- Menotaxis describes organisms' maintenance of a constant angular orientation. A clear demonstration is shown by bees returning to their hive at night and the movement of ants with respect to the sun.
- Mnemotaxis is the use of memory to follow trails that organisms have left when travelling to or from their home.

== Examples ==
- Aerotaxis is the response of an organism to variation in oxygen concentration, and is mainly found in aerobic bacteria.
- Anemotaxis is the response of an organism to wind. Many insects show a positive anemotactic response (turning/flying into the wind) upon exposure to an airborne stimulus cue from a food source or pheromones. Cross-wind anemotactic search is exhibited by some olfactory animals in the absence of a target odor including moths, albatrosses, and polar bears. Rats have specialized supra-orbital whiskers that detect wind and cause anemotactic turning.
- Chemotaxis is a response elicited by chemicals: that is, a response to a chemical concentration gradient. For example, chemotaxis in response to a sugar gradient has been observed in motile bacteria such as E. coli. Chemotaxis also occurs in the antherozoids of liverworts, ferns, and mosses in response to chemicals secreted by the archegonia. Unicellular (e.g. protozoa) or multicellular (e.g. worms) organisms are targets of chemotactic substances. A concentration gradient of chemicals developed in a fluid phase guides the vectorial movement of responder cells or organisms. Inducers of locomotion towards increasing steps of concentrations are considered as chemoattractants, while chemorepellents result moving off the chemical. Chemotaxis is described in prokaryotic and eukaryotic cells, but signalling mechanisms (receptors, intracellular signaling) and effectors are significantly different.
- Durotaxis is the directional movement of a cell along a stiffness gradient.
- Electrotaxis (or galvanotaxis) is the directional movement of motile cells along the vector of an electric field. It has been suggested that by detecting and orienting themselves toward the electric fields, cells can move towards damages or wounds to repair them. It also is suggested that such a movement may contribute to directional growth of cells and tissues during development and regeneration. This notion is based on the existence of measurable electric fields that naturally occur during wound healing, development and regeneration; and cells in cultures respond to applied electric fields by directional cell migration – electrotaxis / galvanotaxis.
- Energy taxis is the orientation of bacteria towards conditions of optimal metabolic activity by sensing the internal energetic conditions of cell. Therefore, in contrast to chemotaxis (taxis towards or away from a specific extracellular compound), energy taxis responds on an intracellular stimulus (e.g. proton motive force, activity of NDH- 1) and requires metabolic activity.
- Gravitaxis (known historically as geotaxis) is the directional movement (along the vector of gravity) to the center of gravity. The planktonic larvae of a king crab, Lithodes aequispinus, combine positive phototaxis (movement towards the light) and negative gravitaxis (upward movement). Also the larvae of a polychaete, Platynereis dumerilii, combine positive phototaxis (movement to the light coming from the water surface) and UV-induced positive gravitaxis (downward movement) to form a ratio-chromatic depth-gauge. Both positive and negative gravitaxes are found in a variety of protozoans (e.g., Loxodes, Remanella and Paramecium).
- Magnetotaxis is, strictly speaking, the ability to sense a magnetic field and coordinate movement in response. However, the term is commonly applied to bacteria that contain magnets and are physically rotated by the force of Earth's magnetic field. In this case, the "behaviour" has nothing to do with sensation and the bacteria are more accurately described as "magnetic bacteria".
- Pharotaxis is the movement to a specific location in response to learned or conditioned stimuli, or navigation by means of landmarks.
- Phonotaxis is the movement of an organism in response to sound.
- Phototaxis is the movement of an organism in response to light: that is, the response to variation in light intensity and direction. Negative phototaxis, or movement away from a light source, is demonstrated in some insects, such as cockroaches. Positive phototaxis, or movement towards a light source, is advantageous for phototrophic organisms as they can orient themselves most efficiently to receive light for photosynthesis. Many phytoflagellates, e.g. Euglena, and the chloroplasts of higher plants positively phototactic, moving towards a light source. Two types of positive phototaxis are observed in prokaryotes: scotophobotaxis is observable as the movement of a bacterium out of the area illuminated by a microscope, when entering darkness signals the cell to reverse direction and reenter the light; a second type of positive phototaxis is true phototaxis, which is a directed movement up a gradient to an increasing amount of light. There is a different classification to orientation towards dark areas called scototaxis.
- Rheotaxis is a response to a current in a fluid. Positive rheotaxis is shown by fish turning to face against the current. In a flowing stream, this behaviour leads them to hold their position in a stream rather than being swept downstream. Some fish will exhibit negative rheotaxis where they will avoid currents.
- Thermotaxis is a migration along a gradient of temperature. Some slime molds and small nematodes can migrate along amazingly small temperature gradients of less than 0.1 °C/cm. They apparently use this behaviour to move to an optimal level in soil.
- Thigmotaxis is the response of an organism to physical contact or to the proximity of a physical discontinuity in the environment (e.g. rats preferring to swim near the edge of a water maze). Codling moth larvae are believed to use thigmotactic sense to locate fruits to feed on. Mice and rats, when inhabiting human-made structures, tend to stick close to vertical surfaces; this primarily manifests as running along the floor/wall juncture. Whiskers (vibrissae) are often used to detect the presence of a wall or surface in the absence of sufficient light in rodents and felines to aid in thigmotaxis.

== See also ==
Biology

- Animal locomotion
- Haptotaxis
- Mechanotaxis
- Optomotor response
- Tropism

Different, wider context

- Taxonomy, science of categorisation or classification
