= Thigmotaxis =

Behavioral response to tactile stimuli

Thigmotaxis (from Greek thigma, "touch" meaning contact with an object, and taxis, "arrangement, order", meaning reaction by movement) is a behavioral response to tactile stimuli, typically referring to an organism's movement in response to physical contact with surfaces or objects. For example, animals, when placed into a new enclosed space, tend to stay near the perimeter while avoiding the interior area. This is known as wall-following/touching or centrophobic behavior.

This type of movement is genetically grounded and can be observed in both animals and humans.

== Types ==
=== Positive ===
This occurs when an organism moves towards or remains in contact with a surface or object. Positive thigmotaxis is often observed in animals seeking shelter or protection, as staying close to surfaces can reduce exposure to predators and environmental hazards.

=== Negative ===
This occurs when an organism moves away from contact with surfaces or objects. Negative thigmotaxis can be seen in animals that need to navigate open spaces or avoid areas where tactile stimuli indicate danger or discomfort.

== Examples in animals ==
=== Rodents ===
Laboratory studies of rodents, such as mice and rats, frequently demonstrate positive thigmotaxis. Rodents often prefer to stay close to the walls of an open field or maze, a behavior known as wall-following or thigmotactic behavior. This tendency is utilized in behavioral experiments, such as the open field test, to assess anxiety-like behaviors.

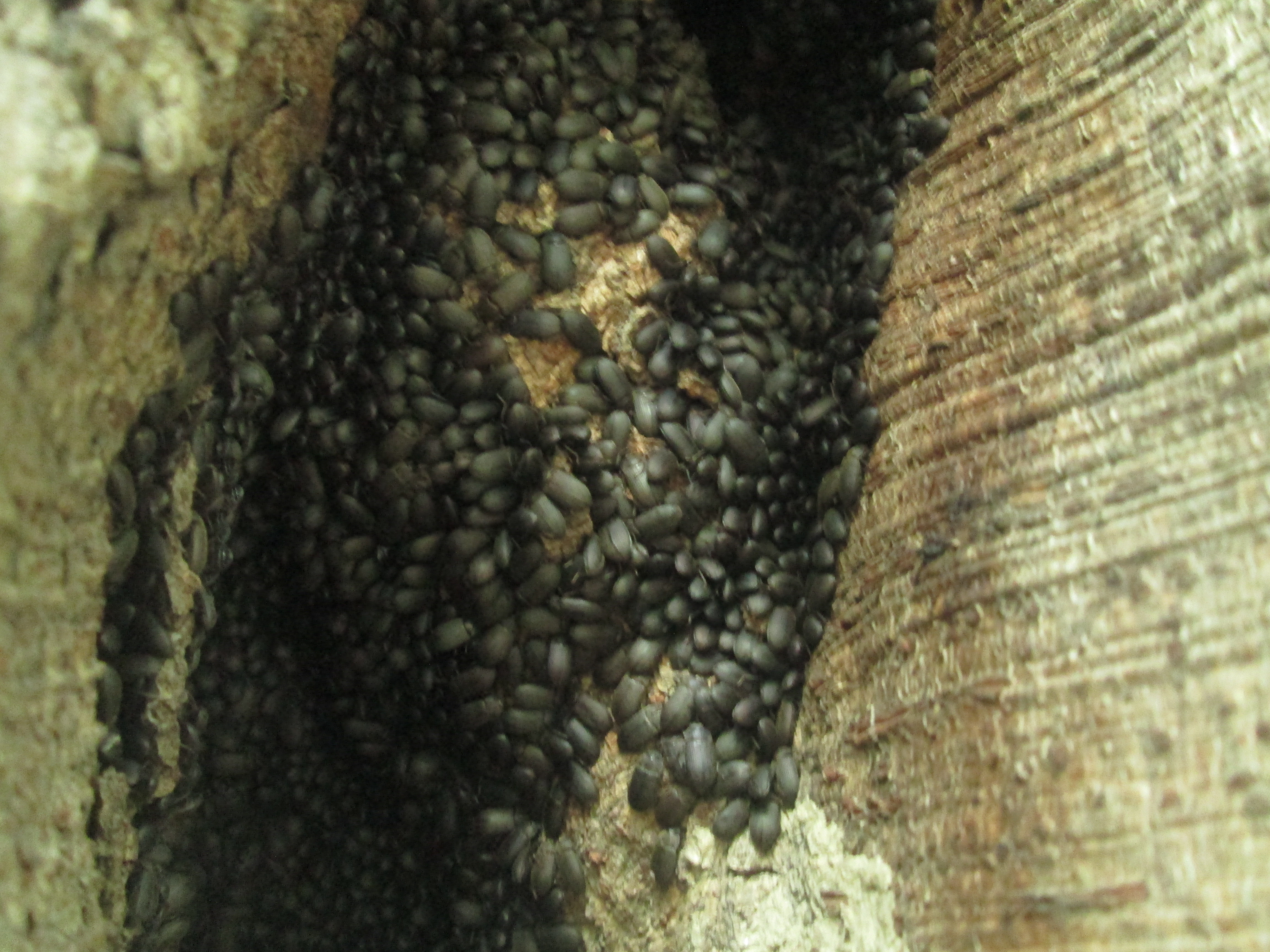
Darkling beetles seeking shelter in tree crevices during rain

=== Insects ===
Many insects exhibit thigmotactic behavior. For instance, cockroaches and ants show positive thigmotaxis by staying close to surfaces while foraging or seeking shelter. This behavior helps them navigate complex environments and avoid predation. Similarly to rodents, it is utilized in behavioral experiments, such as the open field test, to assess anxiety-like behaviors.

=== Fish ===
Certain fish species exhibit thigmotaxis when they seek out and remain close to structures or objects within their aquatic environment. This behavior can provide protection from predators and strong currents.

== Mechanisms ==
The mechanisms underlying thigmotaxis involve sensory receptors that detect tactile stimuli. These receptors can be located on various body parts, such as antennae, legs, or skin. When stimulated, these receptors send signals to the nervous system, triggering a motor response that directs the organism's movement.

In vertebrates, the mechanoreceptors in the skin, known as tactile or touch receptors, play a significant role in thigmotactic behavior. In invertebrates, specialized sensory organs such as setae (bristle-like structures) or antennae are involved in detecting and responding to tactile stimuli.

== Behavioral changes ==
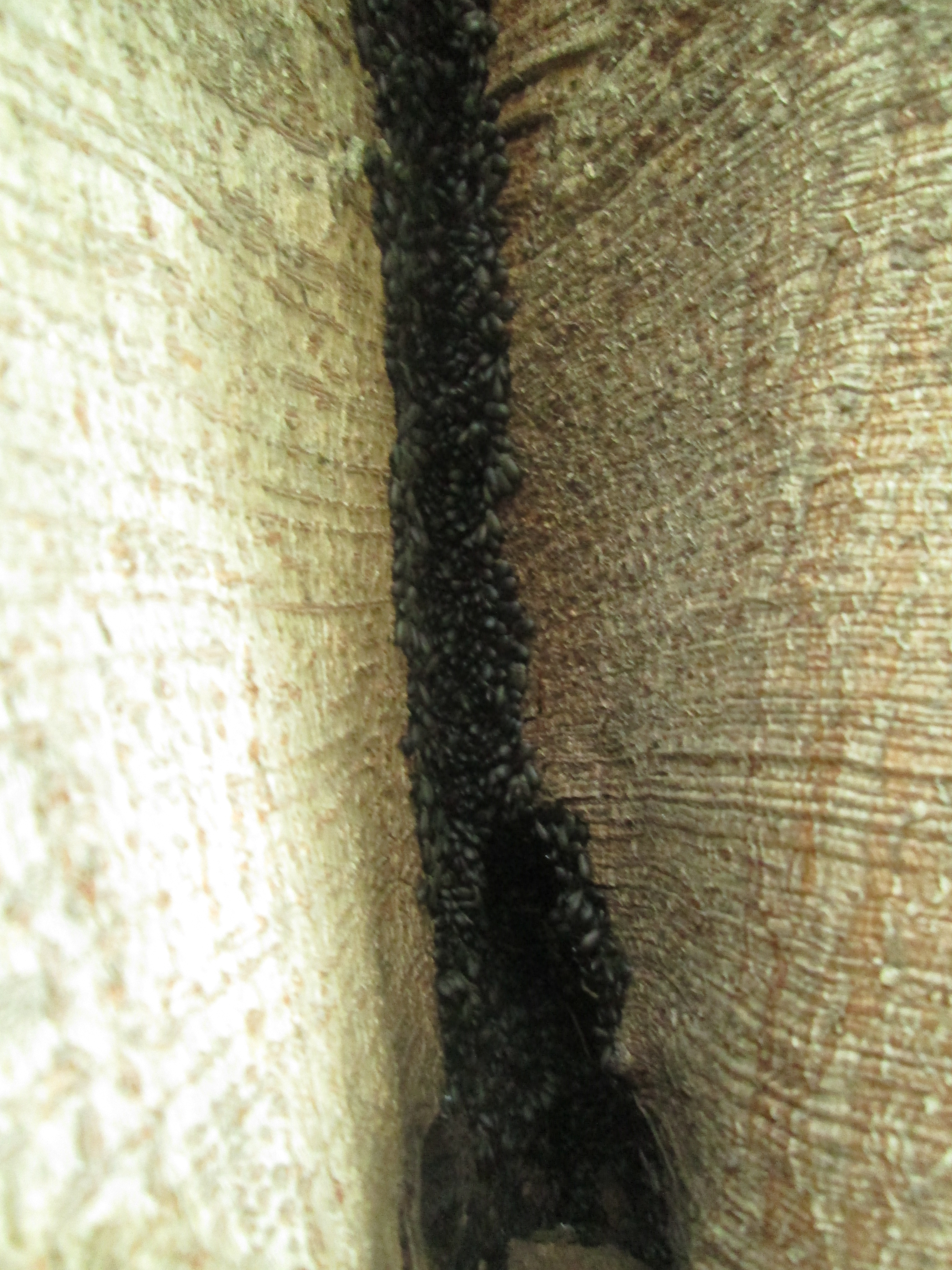
Darkling beetles seeking shelter from rain and predators in tree crevices during monsoon in India

=== Shelter seeking ===
Positive thigmotaxis helps animals find and stay in safe, sheltered areas, which can protect them from predators and harsh environmental conditions.

=== Navigation ===
Thigmotactic behavior aids in navigation through complex environments, allowing animals to efficiently find resources and avoid obstacles.

=== Social interactions ===
In some species, thigmotaxis plays a role in social behaviors, such as group cohesion and territory establishment.

=== Mating ===
In some species, thigmotaxis plays a role in mating behaviors. It is currently debated whether mating status impacts thigmotaxis in Drosophila.

== Research and applications ==
Thigmotaxis is studied extensively in various fields, including neurobiology, and psychology. Understanding thigmotactic behavior can provide insights into the neural mechanisms of sensory processing and motor control. Additionally, researchers use thigmotaxis as a behavioral assay to investigate anxiety, stress, and other psychological states in animal models.

== See also ==
- McCutcheon index
- Tropism
- Durotaxis
- Haptotaxis
- Mechanotaxis
- Plithotaxis
- Thin layers (oceanography)

== Sources ==
- Kallai J, Makany T, Csatho A, Karadi K, Horvath D, Kovacs-Labadi B, et al. (2007). "Cognitive and affective aspects of thigmotaxis strategy in humans". Behavioral Neuroscience. 121 (1): 21–30. doi:10.1037/0735-7044.121.1.21. ISSN 1939-0084.
