= Alex Mogilner =

Alex Mogilner is an American professor at the Courant Institute of Mathematical Sciences and the Department of Biology at New York University. His major contributions to science are in the areas of cell motility and division, mitosis and cytoskeleton.

== Biography ==
Mogilner was born in the Soviet Union on May 21, 1963. He received his candidate of science in physics in 1990 at the Ural Division of the Soviet Academy of Sciences in his hometown of Ekaterinburg.

After two years of research at the University of Manitoba, he went to graduate school at the University of British Columbia in Vancouver and received his Ph.D. in applied mathematics, a program that combined math and biology. He did postdoctoral research at UC Berkeley, then worked at UC Davis, and then moved to NYU. His current work is in computational biology, which combines biology, math and physics.

== Research and Innovations ==
Mogilner's research is on actin dynamics, cell migration, mitosis (on how mitotic spindle assembles and pulls chromosomes apart during cell division) and galvanotaxis.

Mogilner contributed significantly to understanding how mitotic spindles assembled, how migrating cells maintain their shapes, how multiple nuclei in muscle cells get sized and positioned and how cells are guided by electric field in wounds. Most of his studies combine computational models with experimental data. Several important model predictions from his worked were later confirmed by experiments.

His key papers have been cited hundreds of times; the most cited one, in Biophysical Journal, proposed the so-called polymerization ratchet model, which explained how actin filaments push the cell leading edge forward. It has been cited more than 1200 times by October 2026.

He is an Associate Editor at several journals including the Journal of Cell Biology, Biophysical Journal, Molecular Biology of the Cell and Current Biology. He advised tens of postdocs and graduate students.
