= Marine larval ecology =

Study of marine organisms and their environment

Marine larval ecology is the study of the factors influencing dispersing larvae, which many marine invertebrates and fishes have. Marine animals with a larva typically release many larvae into the water column, where the larvae develop before metamorphosing into adults.

Marine larvae can disperse over long distances, although determining the actual distance is challenging, because of their size and the lack of a good tracking method. Knowing dispersal distances is important for managing fisheries, effectively designing marine reserves, and controlling invasive species.

== Theories on the evolution of a biphasic life history ==
Larval dispersal is one of the most important topics in marine ecology today. Many marine invertebrates and many fishes have a bi-phasic life cycle with a pelagic larva or pelagic eggs that can be transported over long distances, and a demersal or benthic adult. There are several theories behind why these organisms have evolved this biphasic life history:

- Larvae use different food sources than adults, which decreases competition between life stages.
- Pelagic larvae can disperse large distances, colonize new territory, and move away from habitats that have become overcrowded or otherwise unsuitable.
- A long pelagic larval phase can help a species to break its parasite cycles.
- Pelagic larvae avoid benthic predators.

Dispersing as pelagic larvae can be risky. For example, while larvae do avoid benthic predators, they are still exposed to pelagic predators in the water column.

== Larval development strategies ==
Marine larvae develop via one of three strategies: Direct, lecithotrophic, or planktotrophic. Each strategy has risks of predation and the difficulty of finding a good settlement site.

Direct developing larvae look like the adult. They have typically very low dispersal potential, and are known as "crawl-away larvae", because they crawl away from their egg after hatching. Some species of frogs and snails hatch this way.

Lecithotrophic larvae have greater dispersal potential than direct developers. Many fish species and some benthic invertebrates have lecithotrophic larvae, which have yolk droplets or a yolk sac for nutrition during dispersal. While some lecithotrophic larvae can feed while in the water column, many, such as tunicates, cannot, and so must settle before depleting their yolk. Consequently, these species have short pelagic larval durations and do not disperse long distances.

Planktotrophic larvae feed while they are in the water column. These larvae can remain pelagic for a significant part of their life cycle, allowing them to disperse over long distances. This dispersing ability is a key adaptation of benthic marine invertebrates. Planktotrophic larvae feed on phytoplankton and small zooplankton, including other larvae. Planktotrophic development is the most common type of larval development, especially among benthic invertebrates.

Because planktotrophic larvae remain in the water column for some time and individual larvae have only a small chance of survival, early researchers developed the "lottery hypothesis", which states that animals release huge numbers of larvae to increase the chances that at least some will survive, and that larvae cannot influence their probability of success. This hypothesis views larval survival and successful recruitment as chance events, which numerous studies on larval behavior and ecology have since shown to be false. Though it has been generally disproved, the larval lottery hypothesis represents an important understanding of the difficulties faced by larvae during their time in the water column.

== Predator defense ==
Predation is a major threat to marine larvae, which are an important food source for many organisms. Invertebrate larvae in estuaries are particularly at risk because estuaries are nursery grounds for planktivorous fishes. Larvae have evolved strategies to cope with this threat, including direct defense and avoidance.

=== Direct defense ===
Direct defense can include protective structures and chemical defenses. Most planktivorous fishes are gape-limited predators, meaning their prey is determined by the width of their open mouths, making larger larvae difficult to ingest. One study proved that spines serve a protective function by removing spines from estuarine crab larvae and monitoring differences in predation rates between de-spined and intact larvae. The study also showed that predator defense is also behavioral, as they can keep spines relaxed but erect them in the presence of predators.

=== Avoidance ===
Larvae can avoid predators on small and large spatial scales. Some larvae do this by sinking when approached by a predator. A more common avoidance strategy is to become active at night and remain hidden during the day to avoid visual predators. Most larvae and plankton undertake diel vertical migrations between deeper waters with less light and fewer predators during the day and shallow waters in the photic zone at night, where microalgae is abundant. Estuarine invertebrate larvae avoid predators by developing in the open ocean, where there are fewer predators. This is done using reverse tidal vertical migrations. Larvae use tidal cycles and estuarine flow regimes to aid their departure to the ocean, a process that is well-studied in many estuarine crab species.

An example of reverse tidal migration performed by crab species would begin with larvae being released on a nocturnal spring high tide to limit predation by planktivorous fishes. As the tide begins to ebbs, larvae swim to the surface to be carried away from the spawning site. When the tide begins to flood, larvae swim to the bottom, where water moves more slowly due to the boundary layer. When the tide again changes back to ebb, the larvae swim to the surface waters and resume their journey to the ocean. Depending on the length of the estuary and the speed of the currents, this process can take anywhere from one tidal cycle to several days.

== Dispersal and settlement ==
The most widely accepted theory explaining the evolution of a pelagic larval stage is the need for long-distance dispersal ability. Sessile and sedentary organisms such as barnacles, tunicates, and mussels require a mechanism to move their young into new territory, since they cannot move long distances as adults. Many species have relatively long pelagic larval durations on the order of weeks or months. During this time, larvae feed and grow, and many species metamorphose through several stages of development. For example, barnacles molt through six naupliar stages before becoming a cyprid and seeking appropriate settlement substrate.

This strategy can be risky. Some larvae have been shown to be able to delay their final metamorphosis for a few days or weeks, and most species cannot delay it at all. If these larvae metamorphose far from a suitable settlement site, they perish. Many invertebrate larvae have evolved complex behaviors and endogenous rhythms to ensure successful and timely settlement.

Many estuarine species exhibit swimming rhythms of reverse tidal vertical migration to aid in their transport away from their hatching site. Individuals can also exhibit tidal vertical migrations to reenter the estuary when they are competent to settle.

As larvae reach their final pelagic stage, they become much more tactile; clinging to anything larger than themselves. One study observed crab postlarvae and found that they would swim vigorously until they encountered a floating object, which they would cling to for the remainder of the experiment. It was hypothesized that by clinging to floating debris, crabs can be transported towards shore due to the oceanographic forces of internal waves, which carry floating debris shoreward regardless of the prevailing currents.

Once returning to shore, settlers encounter difficulties concerning their actual settlement and recruitment into the population. Space is a limiting factor for sessile invertebrates on rocky shores. Settlers must be wary of adult filter feeders, which cover substrate at settlement sites and eat particles the size of larvae. Settlers must also avoid becoming stranded out of water by waves, and must select a settlement site at the proper tidal height to prevent desiccation and avoid competition and predation. To overcome many of these difficulties, some species rely on chemical cues to assist them in selecting an appropriate settlement site. These cues are usually emitted by adult conspecifics, but some species cue on specific bacterial mats or other qualities of the substrate.

== Larval sensory systems ==
Although with a pelagic larva, many species can increase their dispersal range and decrease the risk of inbreeding, a larva comes with challenges: Marine larvae risk being washed away without finding a suitable habitat for settlement. Therefore, they have evolved many sensory systems:

=== Sensory systems ===
==== Magnetic fields ====
Far from shore, larvae are able to use magnetic fields to orient themselves towards the coast over large spatial scales. There is additional evidence that species can recognize anomalies in the magnetic field to return to the same location multiple times throughout their life. Though the mechanisms that these species use is poorly understood, it appears that magnetic fields play an important role in larval orientation offshore, where other cues such as sound and chemicals may be difficult to detect.

==== Vision and non-visual light perception ====
Phototaxis (ability to differentiate between light and dark areas) is important to find a suitable habitat. Phototaxis evolved relatively quickly and taxa that lack developed eyes, such as schyphozoans, use phototaxis to find shaded areas to settle away from predators.

Phototaxis is not the only mechanism that guides larvae by light. The larvae of the annelid Platynereis dumerilii do not only show positive and negative phototaxis over a broad range of the light spectrum, but swim down to the center of gravity when they are exposed to non-directional UV-light. This behavior is a UV-induced positive gravitaxis. This gravitaxis and negative phototaxis induced by light coming from the water surface form a ratio-metric depth-gauge. Such a depth gauge is based on the different attenuation of light across the different wavelengths in water. In clear water blue light (470 nm) penetrates the deepest. And so the larvae need only to compare the two wavelength ranges UV/violet (< 420 nm) and the other wavelengths to find their preferred depth.

Species that produce more complex larvae, such as fish, can use full vision to find a suitable habitat on small spatial scales. Larvae of damselfish use vision to find and settle near adults of their species.

==== Sound ====
Marine larvae use sound and vibrations to find a good habitat where they can settle and metamorphose into juveniles. This behavior has been seen in fish as well as in the larvae of scleractinian corals. Many families of coral reef fish are particularly attracted to high-frequency sounds produced by invertebrates, which larvae use as an indicator of food availability and complex habitat where they may be protected from predators. It is thought that larvae avoid low frequency sounds because they may be associated with transient fish or predators and is therefore not a reliable indicator of safe habitat.

The spatial range at which larvae detect and use sound waves is still uncertain, though some evidence suggests that it may only be reliable at very small scales. There is concern that changes in community structure in nursery habitats, such as seagrass beds, kelp forests, and mangroves, could lead to a collapse in larval recruitment due to a decrease in sound-producing invertebrates. Other researchers argue that larvae may still successfully find a place to settle even if one cue is unreliable.

==== Olfaction ====
Many marine organisms use olfaction (chemical cues in the form of scent) to locate a safe area to metamorphose at the end of their larval stage. This has been shown in both vertebrates and invertebrates. Research has shown that larvae are able to distinguish between water from the open ocean and water from more suitable nursery habitats such as lagoons and seagrass beds. Chemical cues can be extremely useful for larvae, but may not have a constant presence, as water input can depend on currents and tidal flow.

=== Human impacts on sensory systems ===
Recent research in the field of larval sensory biology has begun focusing more on how human impacts and environmental disturbance affect settlement rates and larval interpretation of different habitat cues. Ocean acidification due to anthropogenic climate change and sedimentation have become areas of particular interest.

==== Ocean acidification ====
Although several behaviours of coral reef fish, including larvae, has been found to be detrimentally affected from projected end-of-21st-century ocean acidification in previous experiments, a 2020 replication study found that "end-of-century ocean acidification levels have negligible effects on [three] important behaviours of coral reef fishes" and with "data simulations, [showed] that the large effect sizes and small within-group variances that have been reported in several previous studies are highly improbable". In 2021, it emerged that some of the previous studies about coral reef fish behaviour changes have been accused of being fraudulent. Furthermore, effect sizes of studies assessing ocean acidification effects on fish behaviour have declined dramatically over a decade of research on this topic, with effects appearing negligible since 2015.

Ocean acidification has been shown to alter the way that pelagic larvae are able to process information and production of the cues themselves. Acidification can alter larval interpretations of sounds, particularly in fish, leading to settlement in suboptimal habitat. Though the mechanism for this process is still not fully understood, some studies indicate that this breakdown may be due to a decrease in size or density of their otoliths. Furthermore, sounds produced by invertebrates that larvae rely on as an indicator of habitat quality can also change due to acidification. For example, snapping shrimp produce different sounds that larvae may not recognize under acidified conditions due to differences in shell calcification.

Hearing is not the only sense that may be altered under future ocean chemistry conditions. Evidence also suggests that larval ability to process olfactory cues was also affected when tested under future pH conditions. Red color cues that coral larvae use to find crustose coralline algae, with which they have a commensal relationship, may also be in danger due to algal bleaching.

==== Sedimentation ====
Sediment runoff, from natural storm events or human development, can also impact larval sensory systems and survival. One study focusing on red soil found that increased turbidity due to runoff negatively influenced the ability of fish larvae to interpret visual cues. More unexpectedly, they also found that red soil can also impair olfactory capabilities.

== Self-recruitment ==
Marine ecologists are often interested in the degree of self-recruitment in populations. Historically, larvae were considered passive particles that were carried by ocean currents to faraway locations. This led to the belief that all marine populations were demographically open, connected by long distance larval transport. Recent work has shown that many populations are self-recruiting, and that larvae and juveniles are capable of purposefully returning to their natal sites.

Researchers take a variety of approaches to estimating population connectivity and self-recruitment, and several studies have demonstrated their feasibility. Jones et al. and Swearer et al., for example, investigated the proportion of fish larvae returning to their natal reef. Both studies found higher than expected self-recruitment in these populations using mark, release, and recapture sampling. These studies were the first to provide conclusive evidence of self-recruitment in a species with the potential to disperse far from its natal site, and laid the groundwork for numerous future studies.

== Conservation ==
Ichthyoplankton have a high mortality rate as they transition their food source from yolk sac to zooplankton. It is proposed that this mortality rate is related to food supply as well as an inability to move through the water effectively at this stage of development, leading to starvation. Turbidity of water can also impact the organisms' ability to feed even when there is a high density of prey. Reducing hydrodynamic constraints on cultivated populations could lead to higher yields for repopulation efforts and has been proposed as a means of conserving fish populations by acting at the larval level.

A network of marine reserves has been initiated for the conservation of the world's marine larval populations. These areas restrict fishing and therefore increase the number of otherwise fished species. This leads to a healthier ecosystem and affects the number of overall species within the reserve as compared to nearby fished areas; however, the full effect of an increase in larger predator fish on larval populations is not currently known. Also, the potential for utilizing the motility of fish larvae to repopulate the water surrounding the reserve is not fully understood. Marine reserves are a part of a growing conservation effort to combat overfishing; however, reserves still only comprise about 1% of the world's oceans. These reserves are also not protected from other human-derived threats, such as chemical pollutants, so they cannot be the only method of conservation without certain levels of protection for the water around them as well.

For effective conservation, it is important to understand the larval dispersal patterns of the species in danger, as well as the dispersal of invasive species and predators which could impact their populations. Understanding these patterns is an important factor when creating protocol for governing fishing and creating reserves. A single species may have multiple dispersal patterns. The spacing and size of marine reserves must reflect this variability to maximize their beneficial effect. Species with shorter dispersal patterns are more likely to be affected by local changes and require higher priority for conservation because of the separation of subpopulations.

== Implications ==
The principles of marine larval ecology can be applied in other fields, too whether marine or not. Successful fisheries management relies heavily on understanding population connectivity and dispersal distances, which are driven by larvae. Dispersal and connectivity must also be considered when designing natural reserves. If populations are not self-recruiting, reserves may lose their species assemblages. Many invasive species can disperse over long distances, including the seeds of land plants and larvae of marine invasive species. Understanding the factors influencing their dispersal is key to controlling their spread and managing established populations.

== See also ==
- Crustacean larvae
- Ichthyoplankton
