= Gravitaxis =

Directed movement of a cell or organism in response to gravity

Gravitaxis (or geotaxis) is a form of taxis characterized by the directional movement of an organism in response to gravity.

Organisms can perform gravitaxis through different mechanisms, either actively or passively. Many microorganisms have receptors like statocysts that allow them to sense the direction of gravity and to adjust their orientation accordingly. However, gravitaxis can result also from a purely physical mechanism so that organs for sensing the direction of gravity are not necessary. An example is given by microorganisms with a center of mass that is shifted to one end of the organism. Similar to a buoy, such mass-anisotropic microorganisms orient upwards under gravity. It has been shown that even an asymmetry in the shape of microorganisms can be sufficient to cause gravitaxis.

Gravitaxis is different from gravitropism in a way that the latter is more about the growth response of an organism to gravity.

== Taxis ==
Taxis is a behavioral response of a cell or an organism to an external stimulus. The movement is characteristically directional. The movement may be positive or negative. A positive taxis is one in which the organism or a cell gravitates towards the source of stimulation (attraction). A negative taxis is when the organism or a cell moves away from the source of stimulation (repulsion).

== Examples ==
Many microorganisms show gravitaxis, including Euglena. King crab planktonic larvae (Lithodes aequispinus) show negative gravitaxis, but positive phototaxis. Gravitaxis can also be observed in Drosophila. The larval stages of a number of trematodes parasites also show gravitaxis. This gravitaxis helps them locate hosts in the water column. They can either show positive, or negative gravitaxis, depending on the type of host species.

== Etymology ==
The term is coined from gravi- meaning gravity, and taxis or the movement of an organism in response to a stimulus.

== See also ==
- Animal locomotion
- Haptotaxis
- Mechanotaxis
- Optomotor response
- Tropism
