= Traction force microscopy =

Method of examining cell surfaces at the molecular level

In cellular biology, traction force microscopy (TFM) is an experimental method for determining the tractions on the surface of a cell by obtaining measurements of the surrounding displacement field within an in vitro extracellular matrix (ECM).

== Overview ==
The dynamic mechanical behavior of cell-ECM and cell-cell interactions is known to influence a vast range of cellular functions, including necrosis, differentiation, adhesion, migration, locomotion, and growth. TFM utilizes experimentally observed ECM displacements to calculate the traction, or stress vector, at the surface of a cell. Before TFM, efforts observed cellular tractions on silicone rubber substrata wrinkling around cells; however, accurate quantification of the tractions in such a technique is difficult due to the nonlinear and unpredictable behavior of the wrinkling. Several years later, the terminology TFM was introduced to describe a more advanced computational procedure that was created to convert measurements of substrate deformation into estimated traction stresses.

== General Methodology ==
In conventional TFM, cellular cultures are seeded on, or within, an optically transparent 3D ECM embedded with fluorescent microspheres (typically latex beads with diameters ranging from 0.2-1 μm). A wide range of natural and synthetic hydrogels can be used for this purpose, with the prerequisite that mechanical behavior of the material is well characterized, and the hydrogel is capable of maintaining cellular viability. The cells will exert their own forces into this substrate which will consequently displace the beads in the surrounding ECM. In some studies, a detergent, enzyme, or drug is used to disturb the cytoskeleton, thereby altering, or sometimes completely eliminating, the tractions generated by the cell.

First, a continuous displacement field is computed from a pair of images: the first image being the reference configuration of microspheres surrounding an isolated cell, and the second image being the same isolated cell surrounded by microspheres that are now displaced due to the cellular-generated tractions. Confocal fluorescence microscopy is usually employed to image the cell surface and fluorescent beads. After computing the translational displacement field between a deformed and undeformed configuration, a strain field can be calculated by often using a regularization approach, the best of which is the elastic net regularization. From the strain field, the stress field surrounding the cell can be calculated with knowledge of the stress-strain behavior, or constitutive model, of the surrounding hydrogel material. It is possible to proceed one step further, and use the stress field to compute the tractions at the surface of the cell, if the normal vectors to the cell surface can be obtained from a 3D image stack. Although this procedure is a common way to obtain the cellular tractions from microsphere displacement, some studies have successfully utilized an inverse computational algorithm to yield the traction field.

== Limitations ==
The spatial resolution of the traction field that can be recovered with TFM is limited by the number of displacement measurements per area. The spacing of independent displacement measurements varies with experimental setups, but is usually on the order of one micrometer. The traction patterns produced by cells frequently contain local maxima and minima that are smaller. Detection of these fine variations in local cellular traction with TFM remains challenging.

== Advancements ==
In 2D TFM, cells are cultured as a monolayer on the surface of a thin substrate with a tunable stiffness, and the microspheres near the surface of the substrate undergo deformation through cell-ECM connections. 2.5D cell cultures are similarly grown on top of a thin layer of ECM, and diluted structural ECM proteins are mixed to the medium added above the cells and substrate. Although most of the seminal work in TFM was performed in 2D, or 2.5D, many cell types require the complex biophysical and biochemical cues from a 3D ECM to behave in a truly physiologically realistic manner within an in vitro environment.

When the rotation or stretch of a sub volume is large, errors can be introduced into the calculation of cell surface tractions since most TFM techniques employ a computational framework based on linear elasticity. Recent advances in TFM have shown that cells are capable of exerting deformations with strain magnitudes up to 40%, which requires usage of a finite deformation theory approach to account for large strain magnitudes.

== Applications ==
Although TFM is frequently used to observe tractions at the surface of a spatially isolated individual cell, a variation of TFM can also be used to analyze the collective behavior of multicellular systems. For example, cellular migration velocities and plithotaxis are observed alongside a computed stress variation map of a monolayer sheet of cells, in an approach termed monolayer stress microscopy. The mechanical behavior of single cells versus a confluent layer of cells differ in that the monolayer experiences a "tug-of-war" state. There is also evidence of a redistribution of tractions that can take place earlier than changes in cell polarity and migration.

TFM has proven particularly useful to study durotaxis as well.

TFM has recently been applied to explore the mechanics of cancer cell invasion with the hypothesis that cells which generate large tractions are more invasive than cells with lower tractions. It is also hoped that recent findings from TFM will contribute to the design of optimal scaffolds for tissue engineering and regeneration of the peripheral nervous system, artery grafts, and epithelial skin cells.
