= Motility =

Ability to move using metabolic energy

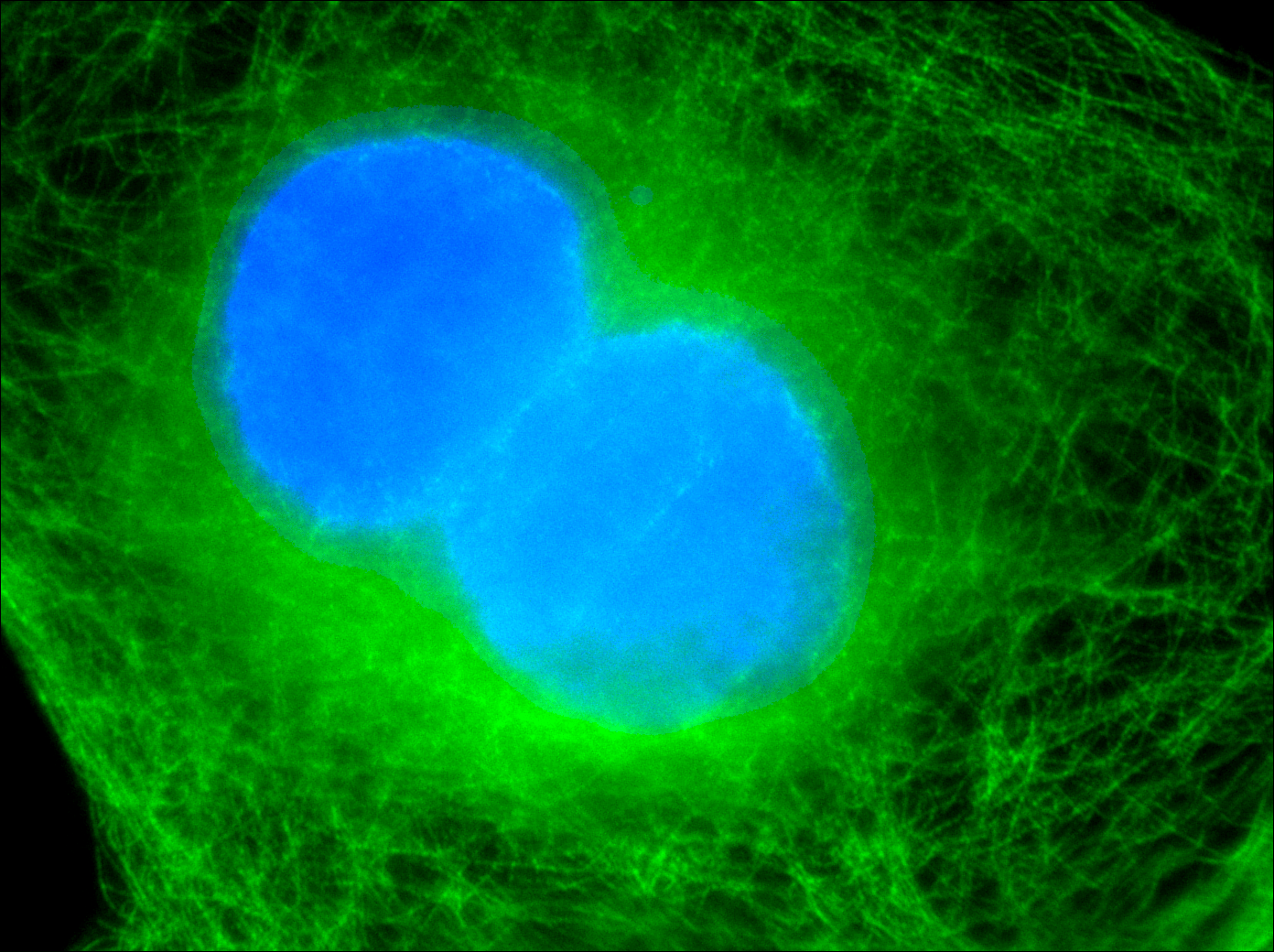
Cell division. All cells can be considered motile for having the ability to divide into two new daughter cells.

Motility is the ability of an organism to move independently by using metabolic energy.

== Definitions ==
Motility, the ability of an organism to move independently, using metabolic energy, can be contrasted with sessility, the state of organisms that do not possess a means of self-locomotion and are normally immobile. Motility differs from mobility, the ability of an object to be moved.

The term vagility means a lifeform that can be moved but only passively; sessile organisms including plants and fungi often have vagile parts such as fruits, seeds, or spores which may be dispersed by other agents such as wind, water, or other organisms.

Motility is genetically determined, but may be affected by environmental factors such as toxins. The nervous system and musculoskeletal system provide the majority of mammalian motility.

In addition to animal locomotion, most animals are motile, though some are vagile, described as having passive locomotion. Many bacteria and other microorganisms, including even some viruses, and multicellular organisms are motile; some mechanisms of fluid flow in multicellular organs and tissue are also considered instances of motility, as with gastrointestinal motility. Motile marine animals are commonly called free-swimming, and motile non-parasitic organisms are called free-living.

Motility includes an organism's ability to move food through its digestive tract. There are two types of intestinal motility – peristalsis and segmentation. This motility is brought about by the contraction of smooth muscles in the gastrointestinal tract which mix the luminal contents with various secretions (segmentation) and move contents through the digestive tract from the mouth to the anus (peristalsis).

== Cellular level ==
Eukaryotic cytoskeletons induce cells to move through liquid and over surfaces, divide into new cells, and the cytoskeleton guides the transport of organelles within the cell. This video captures stained cytoskeletons from the cross section of a leaf of Arabidopsis thaliana.

At the cellular level, different modes of movement exist:

- amoeboid movement, a crawling-like movement, which also makes swimming possible
- filopodia, enabling movement of the axonal growth cone
- flagellar motility, a swimming-like motion (observed for example in spermatozoa, propelled by the regular beat of their flagellum, or the E. coli bacterium, which swims by rotating a helical prokaryotic flagellum)
- gliding motility
- swarming motility
- twitching motility, a form of motility used by bacteria to crawl over surfaces using grappling hook-like filaments called type IV pili.

Many bacteria are nonmotile; examples include Klebsiella pneumoniae and Shigella. Motility can also be temperature-dependent in some bacteria: many Yersinia species are motile at temperatures below 30 °C but nonmotile at 37 °C, whereas Yersinia pestis is nonmotile.

== Movements ==
Events perceived as movements can be directed:

- along a chemical gradient (see chemotaxis)
- along a temperature gradient (see thermotaxis)
- along a light gradient (see phototaxis)
- along a magnetic field line (see magnetotaxis)
- along an electric field (see galvanotaxis)
- along the direction of the gravitational force (see gravitaxis)
- along a rigidity gradient (see durotaxis)
- along a gradient of cell adhesion sites (see haptotaxis)
- along other cells or biopolymers
Muscles give the ability for voluntary movement, and involuntary movement as in muscle spasms and reflexes. At the level of the muscular system, motility is a synonym for locomotion.

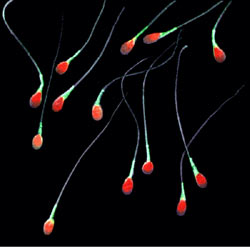
Most sperm have a single flagellum to help them swim. The cervical, uterine, and fallopian linings of the female reproductive system play a more important role in transporting sperm to ova.

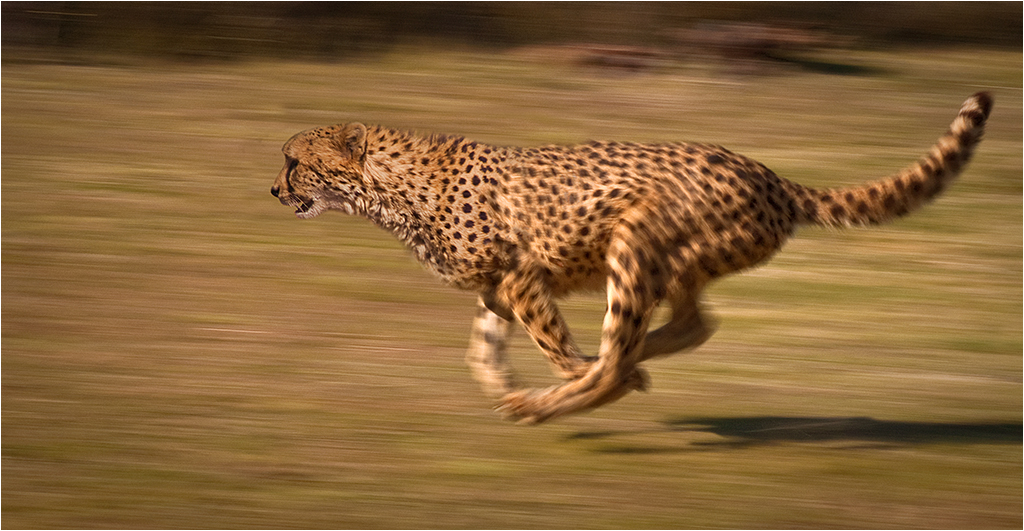
The record speeds cheetahs hold are owed in large to their muscle motility.

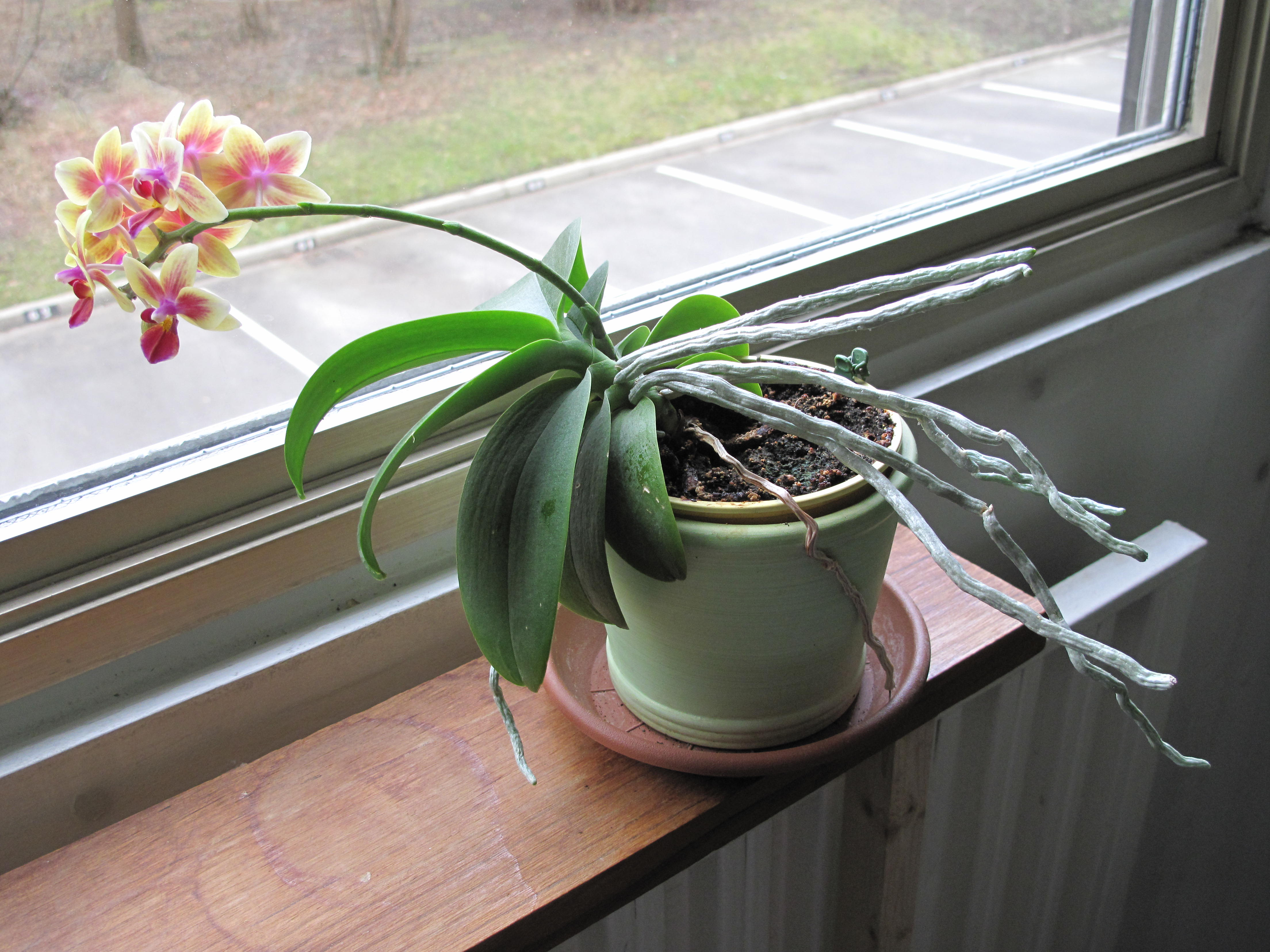
The shoots of plants move by growing towards light. This is known as positive phototropism. The roots grow away from light. This is known as negative phototropism.

Monocytes and macrophages of the immune system engulf Bacteria by extending their pseudopodia. Note that this cartoon is not an accurate representation of phagocytosis.

Motility at the sub-cellular level. This depicts translation - a motile nanoscale molecular process using protein dynamics.

== See also ==
- Cell migration
- Metaboly
