= Plithotaxis =

Tendency of cells to migrate along the local axis of principal stress

Animation of plithotaxis in action

In cellular biology, plithotaxis (from Greek πλήΘος (plíthos) 'crowd, swarm') is the tendency for each individual cell within a monolayer to migrate along the local orientation of the maximal principal stress, or equivalently, minimal intercellular shear stress. Plithotaxis requires force transmission across many cell-cell junctions and therefore is an emergent property of the cell group.

Plithotaxis is found to hold at the level of both a subcellular grid point and an individual cell of a confluent monolayer, and the stresses must be tensile.

== See also ==
- Chemotaxis
- Durotaxis
- Haptotaxis
- Mechanotaxis
