= Rheotaxis =

Type of movement by aquatic life

(Positive) Rheotaxis is a form of taxis, or movement in response to stimuli, seen in many aquatic organisms like fish. It generally involves turning to face an oncoming current. In a flowing stream, this behavior leads them to hold their position rather than being swept downstream by the current. Rheotaxis has been noted in zebrafish and other species, and is found in most major aquatic invertebrate groups. This movement is important for animal survival because the positioning of an animal in the water can increase its chance of accessing food and lower the amount of energy it spends, especially when it remains stationary. Some organisms such as eels will exhibit negative rheotaxis where they will turn away from and avoid oncoming currents. This action is a part of their tendency to want to migrate. Some zooplankton also exhibit positive or negative rheotaxis.

In fish, the lateral line system is used to determine changes in the oncoming flow pattern of a body of water, and the corresponding orientation of the animal toward or away from the current. The system consists of mechanosensory hair cells that detect the movement of water. Animals can also use rheotaxis in conjunction with other methods to orient themselves in the water. For example, sea lamprey will use the flow of the current to identify upstream chemical stimuli, and position themselves towards the direction of the signal.

Rheotaxis is also a phenomenon seen in small-scale artificial systems. In 2019, it was observed that certain self-propelled particles (gold-platinum nanorods) will rheotax and reorient themselves against the flow in small microfluidic channels.
