= Electrotaxis =

Motion of biological cells in an electric field

Electrotaxis, also known as galvanotaxis (named after Galvani), is the directed motion of biological cells or organisms guided by an electric field or current. The directed motion of electrotaxis can take many forms, such as; growth, development, active swimming, and passive migration. A wide variety of biological cells can naturally sense and follow DC electric fields. Such electric fields arise naturally in biological tissues during development and healing. These and other observations have led to research into how applied electric fields can impact wound healing An increase in wound healing rate is regularly observed and this is thought to be due to the cell migration and other signaling pathways that are activated by the electric field. Additional research has been conducted into how applied electric fields impact cancer metastasis, morphogenesis, neuron guidance, motility of pathogenic bacteria, biofilm formation, and many other biological phenomena.

== History ==
In 1889, German physiologist Max Verworn applied a low-level direct current to a mixture of bacterial species and observed that some moved toward the anode and others moved to the cathode. Two years later, in 1891, Belgian microscopist E. Dineur made the first known report of vertebrate cells migrating directionally in a direct current, a phenomenon which he coined galvanotaxis. Dineur used a zinc–copper cell to apply a constant current to the abdominal cavity of a frog via a pair of platinum electrodes. He found that inflammatory leukocytes aggregated at the negative electrode. Since these pioneering studies, a variety of different cell types and organisms have been shown to respond to electric fields.

== Mechanism ==
Understanding of the underlying mechanisms that cause electrotaxis to occur is limited. The diversity of biological cells and environmental conditions make it likely that there are many different mechanisms that allow for cells to migrate due to electric fields. Some studies have indicated that certain organisms move passively without any specific sensing mechanisms applied to alter active motility.

=== Bacteria ===
In a sufficiently strong electric field, small cells may move as uniformly charged particles or dipoles. Other research reports suggest that bacteria cells might perceive local electric fields via chemotaxis. This is done by sensing redox molecules that have formed a gradient relative to the poised electrical surface in the local environment.

=== Mammalian cells ===
The method of detection of a field in mammalian cells is under active investigation and might involve several mechanisms. For now, it is thought that redistribution of membrane-bound sensors dragged by Coulombic forces and electro-osmosis at the membrane would cause the cell to polarize, then migrate. Mathematical modeling suggests that a 6-10% change in sensor concentration across the cell is detectable. Experiments that repeatedly changed orientation of a field applied to several cell lines suggest that sensor polarization occurs on a relatively rapid timescale, perhaps several seconds, compared to the cell migration response, which is observed after 5–10 minutes. This allows cells to time-average changes in the direction of the electric field before migrating.

=== Evidence for a mechanism ===
There has been no discovery of a single mechanism or process by which all cells undergo electrotaxis. However, multiple explanations have been investigated, resulting in a considerable body of evidence and a limited understanding of how cells migrate using electric fields. Electrotaxis is thought to operate based on changes in Ca^{2+} concentration produced by direct-current electric fields (dcEFs) due to the fact that exposure to dcEFs) can cause concentration changes in excess of 1 millimolar. Additionally, calcium channel inhibition using Co^{2+} or D600 was observed to prevent electrotaxis in most cases. Cells that exhibit electrotaxis undergo an influx of Ca^{2+} ions on the anodal side of the cell, and simultaneous decrease in concentration on that cathodal side. This rearrangement is thought to create "push-pull" forces that induce net movement in the cathodal direction. However, this process would be more complicated in cells with intercellular calcium stores or voltage-gated calcium channels. In addition, voltage-gated sodium channels, protein kinases, growth factors, surface charge, and protein electrophoresis have been observed to have a role in electrotaxis. However, there is no knowledge of a sensor molecule used specifically for electrotaxis. The exact role and function of these and other cellular components in electrotaxis is not fully understood and is the basis of ongoing research.

=== Signaling pathways used in electrotaxis ===
In the absence of a complete explanation of the mechanism behind electrotaxis, certain signaling pathways have been found to have an involvement in electrotaxis. In both neutrophils and keratinocytes, Zhau et al. experimentally determined that physiological strength EFs induce phosphorylation of extracellular-signal-regulated kinase (ERK), p38 mitogen-activated Kinase (MAPK), Src, and Akt on ser 473. In chemotaxis, Src and Akt are polarized by phosphatidylinositol-3-OH kinase-γ (PI(3)Kγ) activation and inhibition of phosphate tensin homolog (PTEN). In the experiment, phosphorylated Src polarized in the direction of migration when influenced by physiological strength EFs, as is also seen in chemotaxis. Phosphatidylinositol-3,4,5-triphosphate (PtdIns(3,4,5)P_{3}), another molecule used in signaling, polarized to the leading edge of HL60 cells when subjected to an EF. Upon reversal of the EF, polarization PtdIns(3,4,5)P_{3} rapidly reversed to the new direction of migration. Treatment with lantruculin did not prevent this from occurring, indicating that polarization is not actin-dependent. Cells in which the gene encoding PI(3)Kγ, Pik3cg, was disrupted exhibited reduced electrotaxic responses. Pharmocological inhibition of PI(3)K in keratinocytes produced the same results. Similarly, genetic disruption of PTEN resulted in increased phosphorylation of ERK and Akt and a greater electrotaxic response. Consideration of these results suggests that PI(3)Kγ and PTEN are involved in the signaling pathway used in electrotaxis.

== Role in wound healing ==
A transepithelial potential (TEP) is created by a difference in ion concentrations across a tissue barrier in the body. In humans, a gradient exists between the outermost and innermost layers of skin across the entire body. This gradient can range from 10mV to 60mV, depending on which part of the body is measured. The potential is created by epithelial cells, which pump Cl^{−} ions out of the skin through the apical membrane and transport Na^{+} ions to the basal side of the epithelium. This is supported by an experiment in which Na^{+} and Cl^{−} transport was increased by addition of AgNO_{3,} and a corresponding increase in membrane potential was observed. Furosemide, a Cl^{−} efflux inhibitor, also decreased the strength of the field in corneal cells. These potentials are maintained elsewhere on the body, such as in the GI, urinary, and respiratory ducts, as well as the corneal epithelium. When the epithelium is pierced by some kind of wound, the barrier which establishes the electric potential has been removed, and so the TEP cannot be maintained. This creates a lateral EF, running from intact epithelium toward the edges of the wound. These wound EFs last as long as the wound takes to heal, and are involved in guiding various types of cells toward the injury in order to facilitate recovery These lateral fields arise instantaneously upon disruption of the epithelium and gradually increase to their maximum strength. The current strength then declines but is maintained throughout the healing process. The strength and direction of these fields are the same regardless of the size of a wound.

Healing of skin wounds is a complex process involving the cooperation of various elements of the body, such as platelets, immune cells, epithelial cells, and fibroblasts. This process is coordinated largely by chemical signals, but there is evidence that electrotaxis plays an additional role in directing specific cell types toward the site of an injury. During the proliferation phase of recovery, keratinocytes move toward the cathodal side of the EFs occurring around and injury, bringing them toward the edge of the wound. In fact, in vitro experimentation found that application of physiological strength EFs could override other signals and guide cells to migrate towards or even away from a wound depending on the direction of the field, regardless of chemical factors. EFs have also experimentally been found to influence cell migration in human umbilical vein cells, dermal fibroblasts, and myofibroblasts.

== Role in cancer metastasis ==
Cancer metastasis is the process by which a tumor spreads from its place of origin in the body to distant tissues. Cancer cells and tumors have been known to produce and respond to electrical currents within the body. Cancer cells isolated from brain, prostate, and lung tumors have all been observed to have electrotaxis responses, and there is evidence suggesting that electrotaxis may play a role in cancer cell metastasis.
