= Optomotor response =

Innate orienting behavior common in fish and insects

In behavioral biology, the optomotor response is an innate, orienting behavior evoked by whole-field visual motion and is common to fish and insects during locomotion, such as swimming, walking and flying. The optomotor response has algorithmic properties such that the direction of the whole-field coherent motion dictates the direction of the behavioral output (e.g., leftward visual stimuli lead to turning left, and rightward visual stimuli lead to turning right). For instance, when zebrafish larvae are presented with a sinusoidal black and white grating pattern, the larvae will turn and swim in the direction of the perceived motion.

Optomotor response in Drosophila melanogaster

== Purpose ==
The optomotor response is essential for animals to correct unplanned course perturbations while navigating through their environment, such as current shifts around a swimming fish or air gusts around flying insects. The response is rapid and instinctual, with pure delay times of just 20-40ms for fruit flies in flight.

The optomotor response is a central feature of a fly's flight control system: flies subject to unplanned apparent self-motion move to minimize the resultant optic flow (retinal movement patterns) and correct involuntary deviations from course. In their natural environments, full-field optic flow patterns are elicited by distinct flight maneuvers; for instance, rotational optic flow is generated by body rotation during hovering, whereas expansion optic flow is elicited by body translation during straight flight. As such, flies respond to panoramic retinal patterns of visual expansion with robust steering maneuvers away from the expansion point (mimicking an approaching object) to avoid collisions and maintain upwind flight postures.

== Research Applications ==
The optomotor response is frequently used as a behavioral assay. In zebrafish, the optomotor response is frequently used as a metric of visual performance as it can be reliably evoked from 7 days post fertilization throughout adulthood. The contrast and wavelength (color) of the stripes can be manipulated to assess the specific properties of their visual system, such as testing the contribution of color to motion detection. In flies, the optomotor response is used to understand the functional properties of neural circuits in the context of a specific behavior and examine the sensorimotor transformations underlying that behavior. To describe the physiological or behavioral properties of the optomotor response, researchers typically vary the spatial period of projected visual patterns and their velocity. The stimulus regime is often composed of periods of open-loop large-field rotation or expansion stimuli alternating with periods of closed-loop stripe fixation in which the animal has control of the position of a single vertical bar.

== Characteristics ==
Both behavioral and physiological optomotor responses have distinct tuning curves for the temporal, spatial and contrast structure of moving images. The magnitude and time-course of the optomotor response to optic flow depends on the temporal frequency of image motion, the spatial period of the display pattern, the periodic contrast and the spatial organization of the stimulus, e.g. rotation or expansion. Typically, low spatial-period patterns (i.e. narrow stripes) produce weaker steering responses than high spatial-period patterns (i.e. wide stripes). The strength of the optomotor response to different temporal frequencies for are state-dependent: stationary flies have a peak temporal frequency optima around 1 Hz, while walking flies have a peak behavior response to optic flow between 1–4 Hz and the optimal frequency during flight is much faster, between 3–12 Hz
