= Thermotaxis =

Method of an organism modifying its body based on temperature

Thermotaxis is a behavior in which an organism directs its locomotion up or down a gradient of temperature. Thermotaxis is a behavior that organisms navigate on depending on the temperature. “Thermo” means heat and or the temperature and “taxis” refers to the direction or the movement. Thermotaxis is for the organism to find the best way to survive, it depends on whether it will survive in the warm or the cold.

Lab research has determined that some slime molds and small nematodes (namely Meloidogyne incognita) can migrate along very shallow temperature gradients of less than 0.1°C/cm and sometimes as low as 0.001°C/cm. Theoretical analysis indicates that even this feat is far from pushing the limits set by thermal noise. The natural environment always contains temperature gradients that organisms could respond to, if it were useful. The response of the slime mold and nematode is complicated and thought to allow them to move toward an appropriate level in soil. Other invertebrates that have experimentally exhibited negative thermotaxis include Armadillidium vulgare. Recent research suggests that mammalian sperm employ thermotaxis to move to an appropriate location in the female's oviduct (see Sperm guidance).

Other experiments have found that pillbugs negatively respond to

Only capacitated sperm can respond to these temperature differences. Thermotaxis helps guide sperm over longer distances. During ovulation, a temperature gradient forms because the sperm reservoir site is cooler. The mechanism by which sperm detect this gradient remains an active area of research.

There are two types of thermotaxis, positive and negative. Organisms that are positive will move towards areas that are warmer and negative organisms will away from the areas that are warm to an area that is cool.
