= Mechanotaxis =

Directed movement of cell motility via mechanical cues

Mechanotaxis refers to the directed movement of cell motility via mechanical cues (e.g., fluidic shear stress, substrate stiffness gradients, etc.). In response to fluidic shear stress, for example, cells have been shown to migrate in the direction of the fluid flow. Mechanotaxis is critical in many normal biological processes in animals, such as gastrulation, inflammation, and repair in response to a wound, as well as in mechanisms of diseases such as tumor metastasis.

A subset of mechanotaxis - termed durotaxis - refers specifically to cell migration guided by gradients in substrate rigidity (i.e. stiffness). The observation that certain cell types seeded on a substrate rigidity gradient migrate up the gradient (i.e. in the direction of increasing substrate stiffness) was first reported by Lo et al. The primary method for creating rigidity gradients for cells (e.g., in biomaterials) consists of altering the degree of cross-linking in polymers to adjust substrate stiffness. Alternative substrate rigidity gradients include micropost array gradients, where the stiffness of individual microposts is increased in a single, designed direction.

== History/background ==
There are multiple ways in which a cell's migration pattern can be influenced, including mechanotaxis, chemotaxis, which is cell movement following a molecular gradient, and haptotaxis, which is cell movement following an adhesion gradient. The first subset of mechanotaxis to be experimentally observed was durotaxis, detailing how contact with a substrate could cause a change in a cell's migration pattern, but more recently researchers have also examined how contact with a neighboring cell could cause changes in a cell's migration pattern. Researchers began investigating mechanotaxis of endothelial cells in blood vessels and wound repair in the 1990s and early 2000s. The early 2000s and 2010s also saw more interest in mechanotaxis in the biomedical engineering community as a potential method of cell manipulation.

== Factors/pathways ==
Cells can detect and react to mechanical stimuli in a variety of ways. One method is through the interaction of E-cadherin presented on the cell membrane. As these receptors interact and are pulled or pushed, tension can be created, leading to a change in the conformation of alpha-catenin bound to B-catenin on the intracellular portion of E-cadherin. This causes the recruitment of vinculin and leads to a change in actin conformation and in the orientation of the cell. Another signaling pathway important in a cell's response to mechanical stimuli is the Wnt planar cell polarity (PCP) pathway. This noncanonical pathway involves the activation of Rho and Rac families of GTPases, which are essential in reorganizing the cytoskeleton in preparation for cell migration. When cells collide, localized signaling of the PCP pathway leads to a change in the polarity of the cell, redirecting the cell in a different direction.

Different cellular receptors are important in cellular mechanotransduction involved in contact with a substrate such as the extracellular matrix (ECM). For example, many cell types express a5b1 integrin on their membranes, which can bind to a major ECM component called fibronectin. This leads to an accumulation of integrins in the area of contact with the ECM, attaching the ECM to the cytoskeleton of the cell and allowing for migration to occur along the ECM through tension at the points of attachment (called focal adhesions, FA) and subsequently the dismantling of FAs as the cell moves along. For this reason, the elasticity of the ECM or another binding substrate is very important. The tension created by a cell pulling against a stiff substrate needs to reach a certain threshold to allow for mechanotaxis to occur.

== Mechanotaxis in development ==
Cell migration is essential in early embryonic development, as a defining characteristic of this phase is the folding and reorganization of the embryo that occurs during and after gastrulation. Without cell migration, complex structures involving multiple cell types that make up complex organisms – like tissues, organs, limbs, etc. – would not develop correctly. There are multiple factors that influence cells to move during development –– but the factors that influence mechanotaxis in development often involve interactions between cells or between a cell and a substrate such as a yolk or membrane.

Contact inhibition of locomotion is involved in the migration of many cell types, including neural crest (NC) cells in vertebrates which give rise to cells of the peripheral nervous system (PNS), facial cartilage, and other non-neural cells throughout the body. NC cells are very mobile, with actin-rich protrusions at the leading edge of each cell in the direction of travel. When an NC cell collides with another NC cell, activation of the Wnt planar cell polarity (PCP) signaling pathway occurs at the point of cell contact, causing localized activation of the downstream effector RhoA. This activation is likely caused by interactions between cadherins on the cell surfaces, and leads to the retraction of the cell protrusions and a change in the cell's polarity, causing the NC cell to change direction. Interestingly, this contact inhibition of locomotion among NC cells is coupled with chemical coattraction between NC cells, which allows the cells to keep in motion for efficient migration as well as to stay together, respectively, leading to collective migration. Cells are most often influenced by surrounding cells towards collective migration in development, such as polster cells which are the first to internalize at the start of gastrulation in zebrafish. Unlike neural crest cells, these cells don't exhibit contact inhibition of locomotion or coattraction, but instead migrate collectively due to E-cadherin interactions between leading cells and following cells. The following polster cells are polarized and migrate towards the animal pole of the embryo for unknown reasons, reaching their actin-rich protrusions towards the leading cells and inducing interactions between E-cadherin proteins located on following cell protrusion membranes and leading cell membranes. The interactions between E-cadherins create tension, which causes internal a-catenin (bridging extracellular E-cadherin with intracellular actin) to be stretched into an open configuration, leading to the recruitment of vinculin and eventually the orientation of actin towards the same direction of migration as the following cells. Without these E-cadherin interactions, leading cells will exhibit non-directional migration.

== Mechanotaxis in wound healing ==
In wound healing, fluid shear stress plays a large role in the mechanotaxis of endothelial cells to the wound site. The inner lining of blood vessels is composed of these endothelial cells, which means that these cells are continuously experiencing fluid shear stress from blood rushing through the vessels. This mechanical stress on the apical side of the endothelial cells leads to integrin signaling, which involves the recruitment of focal adhesion kinase (FAK), Shc, and Crk, and will lead to changes in cell-cell and cell-ECM adhesion. These changes involve lamellipodial protrusions and focal adhesion (FA) formation at the front of the cell, as well as the dismantling of FAs at the rear of the cell, and cause endothelial cells to move in the direction of the flow. Constant laminar flow has been found to improve cell migration in wounds and increases the rate of wound closure.

== See also ==
- Chemotaxis
- Durotaxis
- Haptotaxis
- Plithotaxis
