= Haptotaxis =

Migration of cells in the direction of cellular adhesion along a surface

In cellular biology, haptotaxis (from Greek ἅπτω (hapto) 'touch, fasten' and τάξις (taxis) 'arrangement, order') is the directional motility or outgrowth of cells, e.g. in the case of axonal outgrowth, usually up a gradient of cellular adhesion sites or substrate-bound chemoattractants (the gradient of the chemoattractant being expressed or bound on a surface, in contrast to the classical model of chemotaxis, in which the gradient develops in a soluble fluid). These gradients are naturally present in the extracellular matrix (ECM) of the body during processes such as angiogenesis, or artificially present in biomaterials where gradients are established by altering the concentration of adhesion sites on a polymer substrate.

== Clinical significance ==
Haptotaxis plays a major role in the efficient healing of wounds. For example, when corneal integrity is compromised, epithelial cells quickly cover the damaged area by proliferation and migration (haptotaxis). In the corneal stroma, keratocytes within the wounded area undergo apoptosis, leaving the stroma devoid of cells that must be replaced. Keratocytes surrounding the wounded area proliferate and become fibroblasts that migrate to fill the wounded area. This creates a healthy environment with myofibroblasts and extracellular matrix. This is known as light backscattering or subepithial haze. When there is injury to an epithelial cell heptotaxis occurs, which is highly influenced by the cell's velocity, which is in turn influenced by direction of cell motility. Cells migrate easily and quickly in packs, so when one cell moves the rest follow in response to the gradient and initial cell movement. Mechanical effects like the buildup of tensile forces may play an important role for both division as well as motility of cells in tissue.

== Methods of study ==
As defined above, haptotaxis is the motility of cells up a gradient of substrate bound molecules. There is a wide variety of procedures to set up this gradient in vitro for the study of haptotaxis. The two main categories can be classified into either continuous or digital. Both types are relatively easy to produce, but digital gradients give more accurate concentration calculations. Overall, the methods in use currently can be improved to mirror the in vivo environment more, as the resolution of the gradients is not as sharp in vitro as they are in vivo. Also, biological gradients have the ability to change geometry, which current models in vitro cannot mimic. These gradients are useful in gaining understanding of the basics of haptotaxis, but because of the complex and fluid nature of these gradients, a deeper understanding of the in vivo condition is difficult to ascertain.

== Tumor cells and haptotaxis ==
A characteristic of many cancers is the ability to move throughout the body. These are malignant cells, and pose a serious threat to the health of an individual. It has been indicated that haptotaxis plays a role in the ability of malignant cells to metastasize. One factor that was initially found to influence haptotaxis is serum spreading factor, which is present in blood serum and interstitial tissues. The presence of serum spreading factor was shown to influence directed migration along a gradient of substrate molecules in a few types of cancer cells. Another component important in the haptotaxis of tumor cells is MenaINV, which is an actin regulatory protein that becomes increasingly expressed in tumor cells. This actin regulatory protein binds to fibronectin receptors and aids in the haptotactic and chemotactic processes of tumor cells.

== Pathology ==
Haptotaxis plays a role in several kinds of diseases where the movement or aggregation of cells causes the symptoms. As mentioned before, cancers that are metastatic have the ability to perform haptotaxis in order to spread throughout the body. This ability is not limited to tumor cells. Idiopathic pulmonary fibrosis (IPF) is a disease marked by fibrosis in lung mesothelial cells. TGF-β1 is a cytokine found in higher concentrations of lungs from patients who have IPF, and induces haptotaxis of pleural mesothelial cells. At the same time, TGF-β1 causes the mesothelial cells to develop into myofibroblasts, which contribute to the symptoms in IPF. The result is that there becomes an aggregation of myofibroblasts in the lungs, which leads to fibrosis of the mesothelial cells. During nephritis, VCAM-1 is expressed in higher levels on the tubules of nephrons, which leads to increased leukocyte migration via the gradient established by VCAM-1. This increased expression was not found on the capillary endothelial cells. This migration of leukocytes leads to inflammation and tissue destruction characteristic of an inflammatory response.

== Immune system ==
Movement of cells is vital for the function of the immune system, and especially for antigen presenting cells. Dendritic cells (one of the main antigen presenting cells in the immune system), move towards the lymph nodes after phagocytizing an antigen in order to present the antigen to T cells. Chemokines influence these movements, especially CCL21, which is bound to lymphatic endothelial cell membranes. The influence is short range, but causes movement of the dendritic cells up a fixed chemical gradient. Other leukocytes also exhibit haptotactic movement: neutrophils undergo IL-8 mediated migration, while monocytes, basophils, eosinophils and some T cells are influenced by RANTES chemokines. In the autoimmune disorder rheumatoid arthritis and in osteoarthritis, the associated swelling and migration of neutrophils to the affected site has been shown to be linked to membrane bound midkine cytokine. This cytokine operates in a haptotactic fashion, attracting local neutrophils to the site of expression.

== Tissue development ==
Haptotaxis plays a role in organizing cells to form tissues and specific regions of those tissues. Fibronectin and laminin both play a role in adrenocyte mutation into distinctive distribution in the adrenal gland. The adrenocytes migrate centripetally as they mature towards the medulla of the adrenal gland, and this movement may be a result of haptotactic forces mediated by fibronectin and laminin. In nerve cells, axonal growth is mediated by nerve growth factor in a haptotactic manner, where the axon of nerve cells grows along the gradient. This information could be used to possibly develop methods to promote nerve regeneration in patients that have nerve damage. Another regenerative strategy is the use of mesenchymal stem cells, which can differentiate into different kinds of connective tissue in the wound healing process. The haptotaxis is mediated by fibronectin, vitronectin, and type I collagen. A recent study has tentatively proposed the idea that the structures on cells responsible for sensing the membrane protein gradients are attenuated filopodia. Also, the more amount of filopodia present on the leading edge of the migrating cell, the more responsive the cell is to the haptotactic gradient. This is important because there is the possibility that all motile cells that display filopodia may be responding to haptotactic gradients. Further research is required in the subject, but it is clear that more and more kinds of cell undergo haptotaxis than originally believed.

== Therapeutic uses ==
The placement of haptotactic molecules would benefit most in situations where increased numbers of cells are required to move to a desired location to help the healing process either directly or by their cell products. The introduction of haptotactic peptides may help in healing several diseases such as diabetes mellitus, hemophilia A and B deficiencies, and Parkinson's disease. The haptoctatic molecules would play a role in healing by restricting other bioengineered cells that have the ability to produce the needed cell products to the desired area of the body where therapy is needed. This application can also be used in wound healing, where increased numbers of fibroblasts and keratinocytes aid in wound re-granularization, thus decreasing overall healing time. In regard to prosthetics, making the prosthetic device incorporate successfully with the tissue is a challenge. When the prosthetic's surface is coated with haptotactic materials, the prosthetic is aided in forming covalent bonds with the cells and becomes securely attached to the cell layer. While haptotaxis may not be occurring in this process, it demonstrates the diversity with which this knowledge about haptotaxis can be used.

== See also ==
- Chemotaxis
- Durotaxis
- Mechanotaxis
- Plithotaxis
