= Durotaxis =

Movement of cells according to local rigidity gradient

In cellular biology, durotaxis is a form of cell migration in which cells are guided by rigidity gradients, which arise from differential structural properties of the extracellular matrix (ECM). Most normal cells migrate up rigidity gradients (in the direction of greater stiffness).

== History of durotaxis research ==
The process of durotaxis requires a cell to actively sense the environment, process the mechanical stimulus, and execute a response. Originally, this was believed to be an emergent metazoan property, as the phenomenon requires a complex sensory loop that is dependent on the communication of many different cells. However, as the wealth of relevant scientific literature grew in the late 1980s and throughout the 1990s, it became apparent that single cells possess the ability to do the same. The first observations of durotaxis in isolated cells were that mechanical stimuli could cause the initiation and elongation of axons in the sensory and brain neurons of chicks and induce motility in previously stationary fish epidermal keratocytes. ECM stiffness was also noted to influence cytoskeletal stiffness, fibronectin fibril assembly, the strength of integrin-cytoskeletal interactions, morphology and motility rate, all of which were known influence cell migration.

With information from the previous observations, Lo and colleagues formulated the hypothesis that individual cells can detect substrate stiffness by a process of active tactile exploration in which cells exert contractile forces and measure the resulting deformation in the substrate. Supported by their own experiments, this team coined the term "durotaxis" in their paper in the Biophysical Journal in the year 2000. More recent research supports the previous observations and the principle of durotaxis, with continued evidence for cell migration up rigidity gradients and stiffness-dependent morphological changes

== Substrate rigidity ==
The rigidity of the ECM is significantly different across cell types; for example, it ranges from the soft ECM of brain tissue to that of rigid bone or the stiff cell wall of plant cells. This difference in rigidity is a result of the qualitative and quantitative biochemical properties of the ECM or in other words, the concentration and categories of the various macromolecules that form the ECM meshwork. Though the ECM is composed of many intracellularly-synthesized components - including a number of glycosaminoglycans (GAGs) and fibrous proteins such as fibronectin, laminin, collagen, and elastin - it is the latter two fibers that are most influential in defining the mechanical properties of the ECM.

Collagen is the fibrous protein that gives the ECM its tensile strength, or rigidity. Elastin - as its name suggests - is a highly elastic protein with an important role in tissues that need to return to their original positions after deformation, such as skin, blood vessels, and lungs. The relative concentrations of these two main determinants, along with other less influential matrix components, determine the rigidity of the ECM. For example, collagen concentration has been reported to be correlated to matrix stiffness, both in vivo and in vitro (gels).

=== Measuring rigidity ===
In biological research, the rigidity (or stiffness) is commonly measured using Young's modulus of elasticity, the ratio of stress to strain along an axis, in Pascals. Thus, a material with a high Young's modulus is very rigid. The most precise and well-established method to measure Young's modulus of a tissue relies on instruments - such as the Instron load cell device - that directly apply a mechanical load and measure the resulting deformation. Now, the Young's modulus of a tissue can be easily and accurately estimated without excision using a variety of elastography techniques. These methods induce distortion in the tissue and measure the mechanical properties, usually with ultrasound or magnetic resonance imaging (MRI).

Young's modulus has been repeatedly used to characterize the mechanical properties of many tissues in the human body. The stiffness of animal tissues varies over several orders of magnitude, for example:

- Bovine articular cartilage - 950 kPa
- Mouse skeletal muscle - 12 kPa
- Guinea pig lung - 5-6 kPa
- Human fibrotic liver - 1.6 kPa, healthy human liver 640 Pa
- Swine brain - 260-490 Pa

=== Synthesizing varying rigidity ===
Matrices of varying stiffness are commonly engineered for experimental and therapeutic purposes (e.g. collagen matrices for wound healing). Durotactic gradients are simply made by creating 2-dimensional substrates out of polymer (e.g. acrylamide or polydimethylsiloxane) in which the stiffness is controlled by cross-linking density, which in turn is controlled by cross-linker concentration. The polymer must be coated with a material that the cell can adhere to, such as collagen or fibronectin. The gradients themselves are often synthesized as hydrogels using microfluidic gradient generators followed by photopolymerization.

An advancement to this technique is the use of 3D matrices, which are able to guide cell migration in conditions that are more relatable to the natural three dimensional environment of the cell.

The site of cellular contact with the extracellular matrix is the focal adhesion, a large, dynamic protein complex that connects the cytoskeleton to the ECM fibers through several organized layers of interacting proteins. Integrins are the outermost proteins and the ones that bind directly to the ECM ligands. However, focal adhesions are quite more than simple anchors - their proteins have many roles in signaling. These proteins, such as focal adhesion kinase (FAK), talin, vinculin, paxillin, and α-actinin, interact with small GTPases (Rho, Rac, Cdc42) and other signaling pathways in order to relay even small changes in matrix stiffness and consequently respond with changes in cell shape, actomyosin contractility, and cytoskeletal organization. As a result, these changes can cause a cell to rearrange its cytoskeleton in order to facilitate directional migration.

A cell's cytoskeleton is a constantly fluctuating network of polymers whose organization greatly depends on the physical environment of the cell. At the focal adhesions, a cell exerts a traction force. In other words, it pulls on the ECM. Thus, the cell maintains a mechanical homeostasis between ECM stiffness and cytoskeletal tension across its focal adhesions. This homeostasis is dynamic, as the focal adhesion complexes are continuously constructed, remodeled, and disassembled. This leads to changes in signal transduction and downstream cellular responses. Cell signaling is a product of both the physical and biochemical properties of the ECM and interaction between these two pathways is crucial to understand cellular responses. For example, bone morphogenetic protein (BMP) - a growth factor - is unable to induce osteogenesis under insufficient cytoskeletal tension.

The source of cytoskeletal traction is actomyosin contractility. Increased external stiffness leads to a signal transduction cascade that activates the small GTPase Rho and Rho-associated kinase (ROCK). ROCK, in turn, controls myosin light chain phosphorylation, an event that triggers myosin ATPase activity and the shortening of actin fibers, causing contraction and pulling on the ECM. Though the precise pathway that connects ECM stiffness to ROCK activity is unknown, the observation of increased traction in response to increased ECM stiffness is sufficient to explain the phenomenon of durotaxis. The stronger mechanical feedback would pull the cell towards the stiffer region and cause a bias in directional movement and have other consequences on cytoskeletal and focal adhesion organization.

Consequently, durotaxis must rely on continuous sampling of ECM stiffness over space and time in a process called rigidity mechanosensing. Recent research has revealed that individual focal adhesions do not necessarily exert stable traction forces in response to unchanging ECM stiffness. In fact, while some individual focal adhesions may display stable traction forces, others exhibit tugging traction in the manner of a repeated cycle of tugging and release. The properties of focal adhesions - whether stable or tugging - are independent of their neighbors and as such, each focal adhesion acts autonomously. This tugging traction has been shown to be dispensable to other forms of cell migration, such as chemotaxis and haptotaxis, but required for durotaxis. The focal adhesion proteins (FAK/paxillin/vinculin) - and their phosphorylation-dependent interactions as well as their asymmetrical distribution within the cell (i.e. YAP activation and nuclear translocation via stiffness activated pFAK) - are required in order to exhibit high traction and tugging traction across a wide range of ECM rigidities. Furthermore, a reduction in focal adhesion tension by transferring cells to softer ECM or by inhibiting ROCK results in focal adhesion switching from stable to tugging states. Thus, rigidity mechanosensing allows a cell to sample matrix stiffness at the resolution of focal adhesion spacing within a cell (≈1-5μm).

The integration of biochemical and mechanical cues may allow fine-tuning of cell migration. However, the physiological reasoning behind durotaxis—and specifically the tendency of cells to migrate up rigidity gradients—is unknown.

== Measuring traction ==
The most prevalent and accurate modern method for measuring the traction forces that cells exert on the substrate relies on traction force microscopy (TFM). The principle behind this method is to measure deformation in the substrate by calculating 2-dimensional displacement of fluorescent beads that are embedded in the matrix. High-resolution TFM allows the analysis of traction forces at much smaller structures, such as focal adhesions, at a spatial resolution of ≈1 μm.

== Clinical significance ==
The role of durotaxis under physiological conditions remains unknown. It may serve a purpose in fine-tuning the movement response of a cell to extracellular biochemical cues, though the relative contribution of durotaxis in a physiological environment where a cell is subject to other taxes (e.g. chemotaxis) is unknown, and may in fact prove to be wholly dispensable for cell migration in vivo. The phenomenon might also have a role in several disease states that include the stiffening of tissues, as outlined below.

=== Cancer ===
It is a common observation that tumors are stiffer than the surrounding tissue, and even serves as the basis for breast cancer self-examination. In fact, breast cancer tissue has been reported to be as much as ten times stiffer than normal tissue. Furthermore, a growing and metastasizing tumor involves the cooperation of many different cell types, like fibroblasts and endothelial cells, that possess different rigidities and could result in local stiffness gradients that guide cell migration. There is increasing evidence that durotaxis plays a role in cancer metastasis. Experiments in mice have demonstrated that tumor cells preferentially invade into the adjacent stroma along stiff collagen fibers. These stiff collagen alignments can be used to identify focal sites of breast tumor cell microinvasion. Pregnancy, which has various links to breast cancer incidence and prognosis, involves postpartum breast involution that relies on collagen remodeling and inflammation that converts these collagen fibers into stiffer counterparts, thus establishing a potential link between pregnancy and metastatic properties. Though some research shows that stiffer tumors are indicative of increased metastasis and decreased survival (which contradicts the concept that durotactic cells should be more attracted to the tumor and metastasize less), this is not counter intuitive because collagen-dependent integrin signaling has a wide range of consequences beyond durotaxis, including inhibition of the tumor suppressor PTEN via upregulation of the miRNA miR-18a. Moreover, there is evidence that increased tumor stiffness does in fact correlate with decreased metastasis, as the principle of durotaxis would suggest.

=== Liver fibrosis ===
Fibrosis of the liver is the accumulation of ECM proteins, such as collagen, that occurs in many chronic liver diseases. Increased liver stiffness (of existing collagen) has actually been shown to precede fibrosis and to be required for the activation of fibrogenic myofibroblasts. Fibroblasts move towards the stiffer tissue via durotaxis, and upon reaching it, will differentiate into fibrogenic myofibroblasts. This vicious positive feedback loop of durotaxis-dependent fibrosis could potentially be a therapeutic target for the prevention of liver fibrosis.

=== Atherosclerosis ===
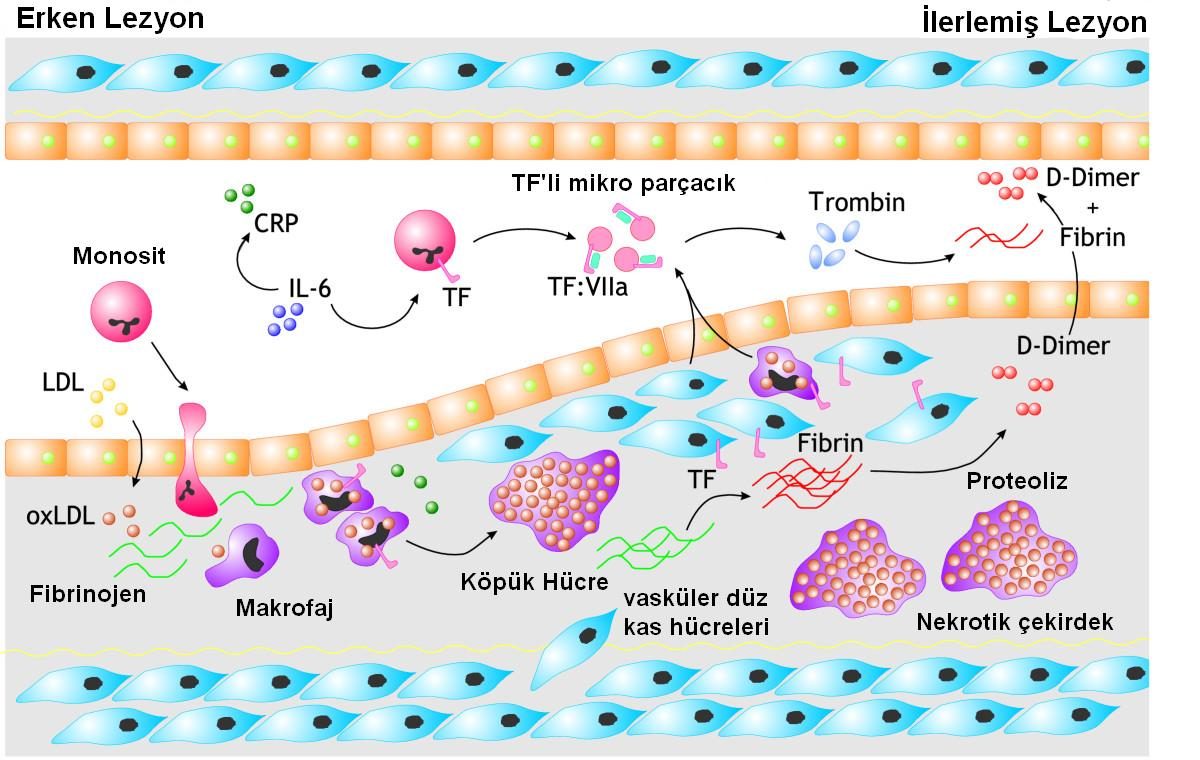
A diagram of the formation of an atherosclerotic plaque. Note the blue vascular smooth muscle cells, which migrate from the tunica media into the tunica intima, where the stiff plaque is forming.

The pathology of atherosclerosis is largely dependent on the migration of vascular smooth muscle cells (VSMCs) into the tunica intima layer of the blood vessel, where they can accumulate lipids, undergo necrosis, and elaborate the ECM (fibrosis). The migration of these cells has also been demonstrated to be rigidity-dependent, and matrix stiffness further affects their proliferation in response to growth factors.

== Mathematical models ==
Several mathematical models have been used to describe durotaxis, including:

- One 2-dimensional model based on the Langevin equation, modified to include the local mechanical properties of the matrix.
- One model based on the description of durotaxis as an elastic stability phenomenon where the cytoskeleton is modeled as a planar system of prestressed elastic line elements that represent actin stress fibers.
- A model where stiffen mediated persistence has the form of Fokker-Planck equation.
- A model where stiffen mediated persistence affect durotaxis.

== See also ==
- Stiffness
- Young's modulus
- Focal adhesion
- Mechanotaxis
- Chemotaxis
- Haptotaxis
