= Cell migration =

Process in multicellular organisms

Cell migration is the movement of cells, either individually or as a group. It is a central process in the development and maintenance of multicellular organisms: tissue formation during embryonic development, wound healing and immune responses all require the orchestrated movement of cells in particular directions to specific locations. Cells often migrate in response to specific external signals, including chemical signals and mechanical signals. Errors during this process have serious consequences, including intellectual disability, vascular disease, tumor formation and metastasis. An understanding of the mechanism by which cells migrate may lead to the development of novel therapeutic strategies for controlling, for example, invasive tumour cells.

Due to the highly viscous environment (low Reynolds number), cells need to continuously produce forces in order to move. Cells achieve active movement by very different mechanisms. Many less complex prokaryotic organisms (and sperm cells) use flagella or cilia to propel themselves. Eukaryotic cell migration typically is far more complex and can consist of combinations of different migration mechanisms. It generally involves drastic changes in cell shape which are driven by the cytoskeleton. Two very distinct migration scenarios are crawling motion (most commonly studied) and blebbing motility. A paradigmatic example of crawling motion is the case of fish epidermal keratocytes, which have been extensively used in research and teaching.

== Cell migration studies ==
The migration of cultured cells attached to a surface or in 3D is commonly studied using microscopy. As cell movement is very slow, a few μm/minute, time-lapse microscopy videos are recorded of the migrating cells to speed up the movement. Such videos (Figure 1) reveal that the leading cell front is very active, with a characteristic behavior of successive contractions and expansions. It is generally accepted that the leading front is the main motor that pulls the cell forward.

=== Common features ===
The processes underlying mammalian cell migration are believed to be consistent with those of (non-spermatozooic) locomotion. Observations in common include:

- cytoplasmic displacement at leading edge (front)
- laminar removal of dorsally-accumulated debris toward trailing edge (back)

The latter feature is most easily observed when aggregates of a surface molecule are cross-linked with a fluorescent antibody or when small beads become artificially bound to the front of the cell.

Other eukaryotic cells are observed to migrate similarly. The amoeba Dictyostelium discoideum is useful to researchers because they consistently exhibit chemotaxis in response to cyclic AMP; they move more quickly than cultured mammalian cells; and they have a haploid genome that simplifies the process of connecting a particular gene product with its effect on cellular behaviour.

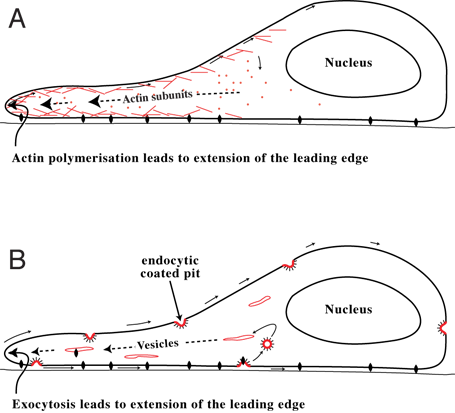
Two different models for how cells move. A) Cytoskeletal model. B) Membrane Flow Model

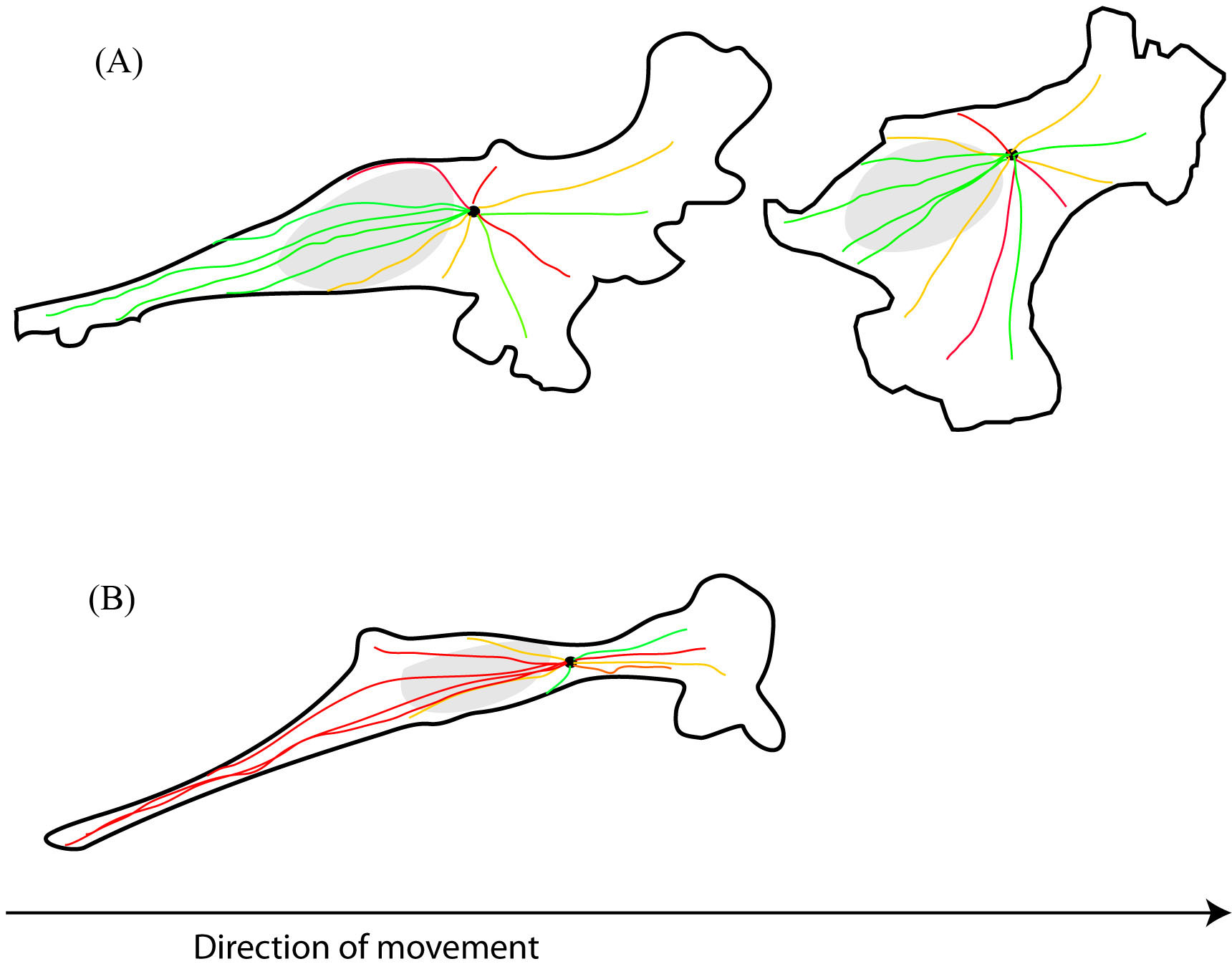
(A) Dynamic microtubules are necessary for tail retraction and are distributed at the rear end in a migrating cell. Green, highly dynamic microtubules; yellow, moderately dynamic microtubules and red, stable microtubules. (B) Stable microtubules act as struts and prevent tail retraction and thereby inhibit cell migration.

== Molecular processes of migration ==
There are two main theories for how the cell advances its front edge: the cytoskeletal model and membrane flow model. It is possible that both underlying processes contribute to cell extension.

=== Cytoskeletal model (A) ===
==== Leading edge ====
Experimentation has shown that there is rapid actin polymerisation at the cell's front edge. This observation has led to the hypothesis that formation of actin filaments "push" the leading edge forward and is the main motile force for advancing the cell's front edge. In addition, cytoskeletal elements are able to interact extensively and intimately with a cell's plasma membrane.

==== Trailing edge ====
Other cytoskeletal components (like microtubules) have important functions in cell migration. It has been found that microtubules act as "struts" that counteract the contractile forces that are needed for trailing edge retraction during cell movement. When microtubules in the trailing edge of cell are dynamic, they are able to remodel to allow retraction. When dynamics are suppressed, microtubules cannot remodel and, therefore, oppose the contractile forces. The morphology of cells with suppressed microtubule dynamics indicate that cells can extend the front edge (polarized in the direction of movement), but have difficulty retracting their trailing edge. On the other hand, high drug concentrations, or microtubule mutations that depolymerize the microtubules, can restore cell migration but there is a loss of directionality. It can be concluded that microtubules act both to restrain cell movement and to establish directionality.

=== Membrane flow model (B) ===
The leading edge at the front of a migrating cell is also the site at which membrane from internal membrane pools is returned to the cell surface at the end of the endocytic cycle. This suggests that extension of the leading edge occurs primarily by addition of membrane at the front of the cell. If so, the actin filaments that form there might stabilize the added membrane so that a structured extension, or lamella, is formed — rather than a bubble-like structure (or bleb) at its front. For a cell to move, it is necessary to bring a fresh supply of "feet" (proteins called integrins, which attach a cell to the surface on which it is crawling) to the front. It is likely that these feet are endocytosed toward the rear of the cell and brought to the cell's front by exocytosis, to be reused to form new attachments to the substrate.

In the case of Dictyostelium amoebae, three conditional temperature sensitive mutants which affect membrane recycling block cell migration at the restrictive (higher) temperature; they provide additional support for the importance of the endocytic cycle in cell migration. Furthermore, these amoebae move quite quickly — about one cell length in ~5 mins. If they are regarded as cylindrical (which is roughly true whilst chemotaxing), this would require them to recycle the equivalent of one cell surface area each 5 mins, which is approximately what is measured.

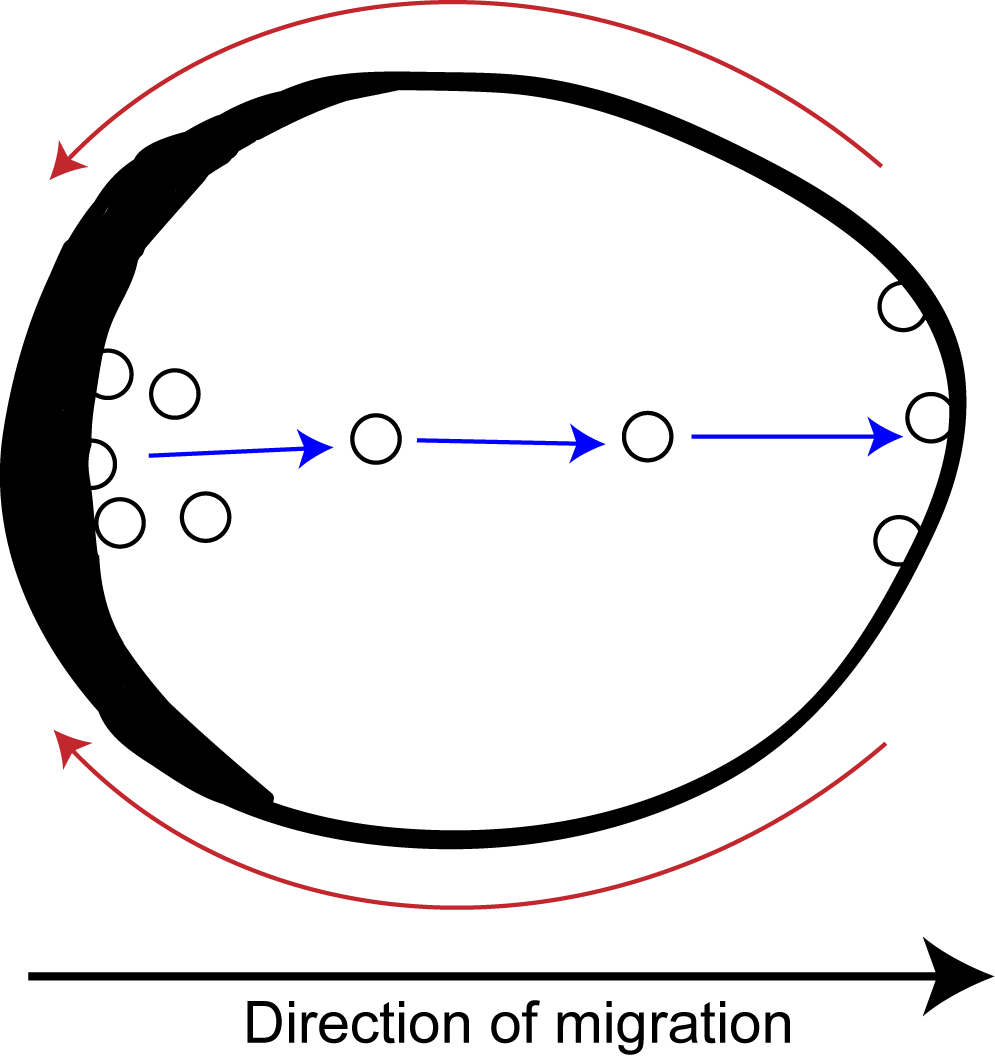
Rearward membrane flow (red arrows) and vesicle trafficking from back to front (blue arrows) drive adhesion-independent migration.

=== Mechanistic basis of amoeboid migration ===
Adhesive crawling is not the only migration mode exhibited by eukaryotic cells. Importantly, several cell types — Dictyostelium amoebae, neutrophils, metastatic cancer cells and macrophages — have been found to be capable of adhesion-independent migration. Historically, the physicist E. M. Purcell theorized (in 1977) that under conditions of low Reynolds number fluid dynamics, which apply at the cellular scale, rearward surface flow could provide a mechanism for microscopic objects to swim forward. After some decades, experimental support for this model of cell movement was provided when it was discovered (in 2010) that amoeboid cells and neutrophils are both able to chemotax towards a chemo-attractant source whilst suspended in an isodense medium. It was subsequently shown, using optogenetics, that cells migrating in an amoeboid fashion without adhesions exhibit plasma membrane flow towards the cell rear that may propel cells by exerting tangential forces on the surrounding fluid. Polarized trafficking of membrane-containing vesicles from the rear to the front of the cell helps maintain cell size. Rearward membrane flow was also observed in Dictyostelium discoideum cells. These observations provide strong support for models of cell movement which depend on a rearward cell surface membrane flow (Model B, above). The migration of supracellular clusters has also been found to be supported by a similar mechanism of rearward surface flow.

Schematic representation of the collective biomechanical and molecular mechanism of cell motion

=== Collective biomechanical and molecular mechanism of cell motion ===
Based on some mathematical models, recent studies hypothesize a novel biological model for collective biomechanical and molecular mechanism of cell motion. It is proposed that microdomains weave the texture of cytoskeleton and their interactions mark the location for formation of new adhesion sites. According to this model, microdomain signaling dynamics organizes cytoskeleton and its interaction with substratum. As microdomains trigger and maintain active polymerization of actin filaments, their propagation and zigzagging motion on the membrane generate a highly interlinked network of curved or linear filaments oriented at a wide spectrum of angles to the cell boundary. It is also proposed that microdomain interaction marks the formation of new focal adhesion sites at the cell periphery. Myosin interaction with the actin network then generate membrane retraction/ruffling, retrograde flow, and contractile forces for forward motion. Finally, continuous application of stress on the old focal adhesion sites could result in the calcium-induced calpain activation, and consequently the detachment of focal adhesions which completes the cycle.

== Polarity in migrating cells ==
Migrating cells have a polarity—a front and a back. Without it, they would move in all directions at once, i.e. spread. How this polarity is formulated at a molecular level inside a cell is unknown. In a cell that is meandering in a random way, the front can easily give way to become passive as some other region, or regions, of the cell form(s) a new front. In chemotaxing cells, the stability of the front appears enhanced as the cell advances toward a higher concentration of the stimulating chemical. From biophysical perspective, polarity was explained in terms of a gradient in inner membrane surface charge between front regions and rear edges of the cell. This polarity is reflected at a molecular level by a restriction of certain molecules to particular regions of the inner cell surface. Thus, the phospholipid PIP3 and activated Ras, Rac, and CDC42 are found at the front of the cell, whereas Rho GTPase and PTEN are found toward the rear.

It is believed that filamentous actins and microtubules are important for establishing and maintaining a cell's polarity. Drugs that destroy actin filaments have multiple and complex effects, reflecting the wide role that these filaments play in many cell processes. It may be that, as part of the locomotory process, membrane vesicles are transported along these filaments to the cell's front. In chemotaxing cells, the increased persistence of migration toward the target may result from an increased stability of the arrangement of the filamentous structures inside the cell and determine its polarity. In turn, these filamentous structures may be arranged inside the cell according to how molecules like PIP3 and PTEN are arranged on the inner cell membrane. And where these are located appears in turn to be determined by the chemoattractant signals as these impinge on specific receptors on the cell's outer surface.

Although microtubules have been known to influence cell migration for many years, the mechanism by which they do so has remained controversial. On a planar surface, microtubules are not needed for the movement, but they are required to provide directionality to cell movement and efficient protrusion of the leading edge. When present, microtubules retard cell movement when their dynamics are suppressed by drug treatment or by tubulin mutations.

Different modes of migration in human cells (mesenchymal, amoeboidal) exhibit opposite orientation of MTOC and nucleus. Mesenchymal migration uses various methods to degrade the surrounding ECM and create a path, it positions its nucleus in the rear, behind the MTOC. Inversely, amoeboid migration is non-destructive and places the nucleus in the front, using it as a mechanical gauge to find the path of least resistance, since the nucleus is usually the largest structure in the cell.

Organelle positioning and morphology also contribute to front–rear polarity and directional movement. Motile cells actively move and anchor organelles (for example mitochondria, lysosomes and the Golgi apparatus) using cytoskeletal forces to support local metabolism, secretion and signalling. The endoplasmic reticulum (ER), a continuous network connected to the nuclear envelope and cytoskeleton, can undergo large-scale reorganization in response to tissue geometry, influencing epithelial migration modes; polarized ER architecture has also been linked to directional migration.

== Inverse problems in the context of cell motility ==
An area of research called inverse problems in cell motility has been established. This approach is based on the idea that behavioral or shape changes of a cell bear information about the underlying mechanisms that generate these changes. Reading cell motion, namely, understanding the underlying biophysical and mechanochemical processes, is of paramount importance. The mathematical models developed in these works determine some physical features and material properties of the cells locally through analysis of live cell image sequences and uses this information to make further inferences about the molecular structures, dynamics, and processes within the cells, such as the actin network, microdomains, chemotaxis, adhesion, and retrograde flow.

== Cell migration disruption in pathological conditions ==
Cell migration could be affected in some pathological states. For example, in conditions of high lipoperoxidation, actin has been shown to be post-translationally modified by the lipoperoxidation product 4-hydroxynonenal (4-HNE). This modification prevents the remodelling of the actin cytoskeleton, which is essential for cell motility. Additionally, another functional protein, coronin-1A, which stabilizes F-actin filaments, is also covalently modified by 4-HNE. These modifications may impair immune cell trans-endothelial migration or their phagocytic ability. Another motility-related mechanism was described: the failure of MCP-1 receptor (CCR2, CD192), TNF receptor 1 (TNFR1, CD120a), and TNF receptor 2 (TNFR2, CD120b) on the monocytes after exposure to pathophysiological concentrations (10 μM) of 4-HNE or after the phagocytosis of malarial pigment hemozoin. These immune cellular dysfunctions potentially lead to a decreased immune response in diseases characterized by high oxidative stress, such as malaria, cancer, metabolic syndrome, atherosclerosis, Alzheimer's disease, rheumatoid arthritis, neurodegenerative diseases, and preeclampsia.

== See also ==
- Cap formation
- Chemotaxis
- Collective cell migration
- Durotaxis
- Endocytic cycle
- Mouse models of breast cancer metastasis
- Neurophilic
- Protein dynamics
