= Anti-inflammatory =

Substance that reduces or suppresses inflammation

Anti-inflammatory refers to any drug, substance or mechanism that reduces inflammation by lessening the redness, swelling, fever, or pain and loss of function which are part of bodies inflammatory response. Anti-inflammatory drugs are agents that inhibit action or production of inflammatory mediators such as cytokines, histamines and prostaglandins. These drugs reduce pain by inhibiting mechanisms of inflammation, as opposed to opioids, which affect the central nervous system to block pain.

Common anti-inflammatory drugs include nonsteroidal anti-inflammatory drugs (NSAIDs), corticosteroids, antileukotrienes, and monoclonal antibodies.

== Clinically approved ==
=== Nonsteroidal anti-inflammatory drugs ===
NSAIDs alleviate pain by counteracting the cyclooxygenase (COX) enzyme involved in pain mechanisms.

Some common examples of NSAIDs are aspirin, ibuprofen, and naproxen. Selective COX-2 inhibitors, such as celecoxib, block the enzymatic conversion of arachidonic acid into prostaglandin, inhibiting inflammation and pain.

Analgesics commonly associated with anti-inflammatory drugs, such as paracetamol (acetaminophen), have no peripheral anti-inflammatory effects. High, short-term doses of NSAIDs may become toxic, causing gastric erosions, stomach ulcers, internal bleeding, hepatotoxicity, or kidney disease.

The risk of death as a result of GI bleeding caused by the use of NSAIDs is 1 in 12,000 for adults aged 16–45. The risk increases almost twentyfold for those over 75. Apart from aspirin, frequent or high doses of prescription and over-the-counter NSAIDs may increase the risk of heart attack and stroke.

=== Corticosteroids ===
Corticosteroids, specifically glucocorticoids or glucocorticoid receptor agonists, are powerful anti-inflammatory agents, but they are also powerful immunosuppressants and are associated with various toxicities, which constrain their use.

=== Antileukotrienes ===
Antileukotrienes are anti-inflammatory agents which function as leukotriene-related enzyme inhibitors (arachidonate 5-lipoxygenase) or leukotriene receptor antagonists (cysteinyl leukotriene receptors), and consequently oppose the function of these inflammatory mediators. Although they are not used for analgesic benefits, they are used to manage diseases related to inflammation of the lungs, such as asthma, as well as being used for sinus inflammation in allergic rhinitis. Examples include montelukast and zileuton.

=== Monoclonal antibodies ===
Monoclonal antibodies, for instance against pro-inflammatory cytokines like interleukin-6 (anti-interleukin-6) and tumor necrosis factor α (TNFα) (TNF inhibitors), are approved and used in the treatment autoimmune diseases and other inflammatory conditions.

=== Colchicine ===
Colchicine is an anti-inflammatory agent that disrupts the function of cytoskeletal by inhibiting microtubule polymerization, doing so prevents the activation, degranulation and migration of neutrophils. Colchicine is mostly used in treatment of acute gout. It can also be used for treating familial Mediterranean fever and pericarditis.

== Investigational and off-label ==
=== Omega-3 fatty acids ===
Omega-3 fatty acids may have anti-inflammatory effects, although clinical studies show that possible effects have been inconsistent, requiring further research. A 2017 review indicated that omega-3 fatty acids may benefit rheumatoid arthritis, although another analysis indicated no consistent effect. There is no good evidence that use of omega-3 fatty acids provides relief in retinal inflammation or in dry eye syndrome.

=== N-Acetylcysteine ===
N-Acetylcysteine (NAC) has been found to possess anti-inflammatory effects and has been clinically studied in the treatment of conditions involving inflammation.

=== Melatonin ===
A 2021 review reported that melatonin has anti-inflammatory effects. Found to reduce levels of several pro-inflammatory cytokines, it remains under preliminary research for its potential to treat inflammation.

=== Serotonin 5-HT_{2A} receptor agonists ===
Serotonin 5-HT_{2A} receptor agonists, including serotonergic psychedelics, are under preliminary research as possible anti-inflammatory agents. The anti-inflammatory effects of some psychedelics, like DOI and psilocybin, have been found to occur at much lower doses than those at which they produce their hallucinogenic effects. Serotonin 5-HT_{2A} receptor agonists with anti-inflammatory properties are under clinical investigation as possible treatments for inflammatory disorders.

=== Tetracyclic antibiotics ===
The tetracycline antibiotics minocycline and doxycycline have been found to have anti-inflammatory and immunomodulatory effects. Minocycline has been found to have some clinical benefit in people with treatment-resistant depression with inflammation but not in those without inflammation.

=== Macrolide antibiotics ===
The macrolide antibiotic azithromycin is known to have anti-inflammatory and immunomodulatory properties. It is said to be established and effective for certain inflammatory airway diseases such as asthma and chronic obstructive pulmonary disease (COPD). Azithromycin is also being assessed for potential treatment of other chronic inflammatory disorders.

=== Statins ===
Statins like atorvastatin and simvastatin are used to treat inflammatory conditions like rheumatoid arthritis and chronic kidney disease. Statins may be useful for treating other inflammatory conditions, like uveitis, depression, and possibly neuropsychiatric disorders. However, higher-quality evidence of statins for treatment of neuropsychiatric and other conditions is still needed.

=== Curcumin ===
A 2019 systematic review and meta-analysis found that curcumin or turmeric did not significantly decrease several circulating inflammatory markers in people with various chronic inflammatory diseases. Major problems of assessing curcumin in human studies are its unknown fate and properties after digestion, and its poor bioavailability.
