= Julius Adler (biochemist) =

American biochemist (1930–2024)

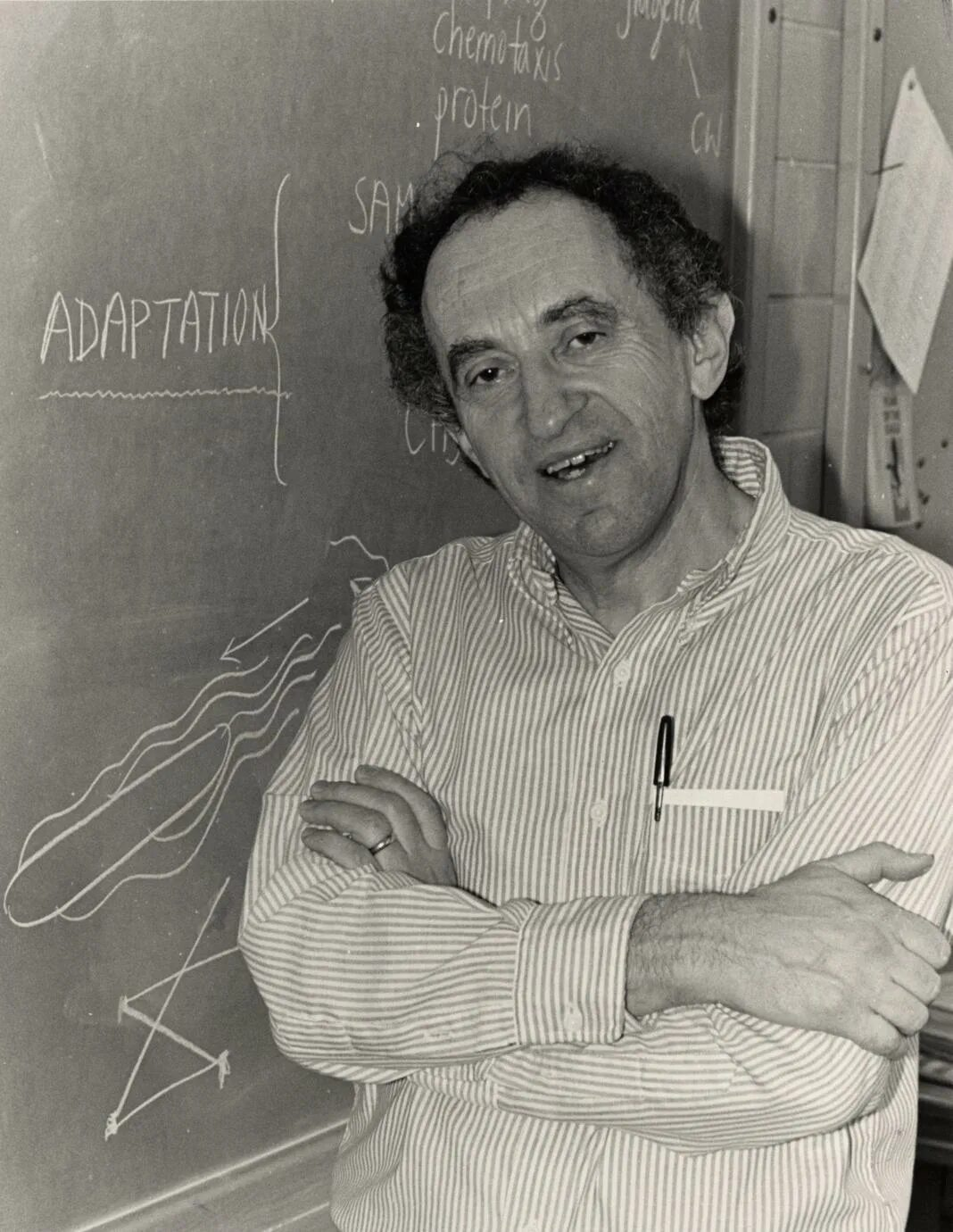
- Born: April 30, 1930; Edelfingen, Württemberg, Germany
- Died: April 2, 2024 (aged 93); Madison, Wisconsin
- Education: Harvard University (A.B., 1952); University of Wisconsin–Madison (M.S., 1954) (Ph.D., 1957)
- Known for: bacterial chemotaxis
- Awards: Pasteur Award Medal (1977); Selman A. Waksman Award (1980); Otto Warburg Medal (1986); R. H. Wright Award in Olfactory Research (1988); Hilldale Award (1988); William C. Rose Award (1996)
- Scientific career
- Fields: biochemistry, genetics
- Workplaces: Washington University in St. Louis (Postdoctoral); Stanford University (Postdoctoral); University of Wisconsin–Madison (1963– )
- Doctoral advisor: Henry A. Lardy
- Other academic advisors: Arthur Kornberg; A. Dale Kaiser

Julius Adler (April 30, 1930 – April 2, 2024) was an American biochemist. He had been an Emeritus Professor of biochemistry and genetics at the University of Wisconsin–Madison since 1997.

== Early life ==
Adler was born in Edelfingen, Germany in 1930. He came to the United States in 1938 at the age of 8 and became a naturalized citizen in 1943. His family settled in Grand Forks, North Dakota where their relatives were among the first Europeans to arrive in 1880. Since he was child, Adler had been fascinated by how organisms sense and respond to the environment.

== Education ==
Adler attended Harvard University and received his A.B. in Biochemical Sciences in 1952. He then studied with Henry A. Lardy at the University of Wisconsin–Madison and earned an M.S. in Biochemistry in 1954 and a Ph.D. in Biochemistry in 1957.

After graduating, Adler did postdoctoral fellowships with Arthur Kornberg in the Department of Microbiology at Washington University School of Medicine (1957–59) and A. Dale Kaiser in the Department of Biochemistry at Stanford University School of Medicine (1959–60). The postdoctoral fellowship at Stanford brought Adler into contact with Esther Lederberg. Adler's subsequent eight-year correspondence with Esther Lederberg resulted in Adler, J.; Templeton, B. (1963). "The amount of galactose genetic material in λdg bacteriophage with different densities". Journal of Molecular Biology. 7 (6): 710–720. doi:10.1016/s0022-2836(63)80118-7. PMID 14102203.

Adler returned to the University of Wisconsin–Madison to join the faculty of the Departments of Biochemistry and Genetics as an assistant professor in 1960. He was promoted to associate professor in 1963 and became professor in 1966. He became an emeritus professor in 1997.

He became Edwin Bret Hart Professor in 1972 and was Steenbock Professor of Microbiological Sciences from 1982 to 1992.

== Contribution to understanding bacterial chemotaxis ==
His work was inspired by a butterfly he saw in the woods when he was a child. This interest in butterflies expanded to include other organisms. It evolved into a curiosity about the behavior of organisms. He thought the behaviors of the monarch butterfly laying eggs on milkweeds and the caterpillars staying on the milkweed until maturity can be explained by volatile chemicals from the milkweed.

To study how organisms sense and respond to the environment, Adler decided to study the behavior of bacteria and then ultimately broaden out to the behavior of all organisms. In 1880, Wilhelm Pfeffer, a famous German botanist, had used motile bacteria to study attraction and repulsion by various plant and animal extracts and chemicals. Adler built on this work. Using the system in Escherichia coli (E. coli), Adler showed that bacteria sensed attractants and repellants with sensory proteins he termed chemoreceptors.

These findings led to the discovery of the methylation of a protein in the envelope of E. coli that is involved in chemotaxis. This protein is methyl-accepting chemotaxis protein (MCP) and it acquires methyl groups from methionine. Adler also identified the methylated residue of MCP.

Adler eventually discovered that E. coli contain several MCPs which play important roles in chemotaxis sensory transduction system. Strains of bacteria without this protein, or lacking the ability to methylate and demethylate them were unable to respond to stimuli. An increase in concentration of attractants led to an increase in methylation level of MCP; similarly, a decrease in attractants or increase in repellents led to a decrease in methylation level.

By the 1980s, it was determined that bacterial chemotaxis resulted from the regulation of flagellar rotation by chemoreceptors. Bacteria swam more smoothly due to a counterclockwise rotation of their flagella in the presence of increasing attractant. In a decreasing attractant gradient, there is an increase in bacterial tumbling, produced by a clockwise flagellar rotation. Adler isolated bacterial envelopes and found that he could restore counterclockwise flagellar rotation by adding artificial electron donors and an energy source. This suggested that the driving force behind counterclockwise flagellar rotation was the proton electrochemical potential.

== Later life and death ==
Adler was recently doing research on sensory reception and decision making in Drosophila fruitflies. Flies were presented with attractant and/or repellent, and mutants that are neither attracted nor repelled were isolated. Defects in the mutants will be studied in hope of revealing the mechanisms involved.

Adler died April 2, 2024.

== Awards and honors ==
- Fellow of the American Academy of Arts and Sciences (1976)
- Pasteur Award Medal of the Illinois Society for Microbiology (1977)
- Elected to the National Academy of Sciences (1978)
- Selman A. Waksman Award in Microbiology of the National Academy of Sciences (1980)
- Otto Warburg Medal of the Society for Biochemistry and Molecular Biology, Germany (1986)
- R. H. Wright Award in Olfactory Research of Simon Fraser University (1988)
- Hilldale Award, University of Wisconsin–Madison (1988)
- Abbott-American Society for Microbiology Lifetime Achievement Award (1995)
- William C. Rose Award of the American Society for Biochemistry and Molecular Biology (1996)
- Elected to the American Philosophical Society (1989)
- Elected fellow of the American Association for the Advancement of Science (1991)
- Elected fellow of the American Academy of Microbiology (1994)
- Elected fellow of the Wisconsin Academy of Sciences, Arts, and Letters (1996)
