= Chemotaxis =

Movement of an organism or entity in response to a chemical stimulus

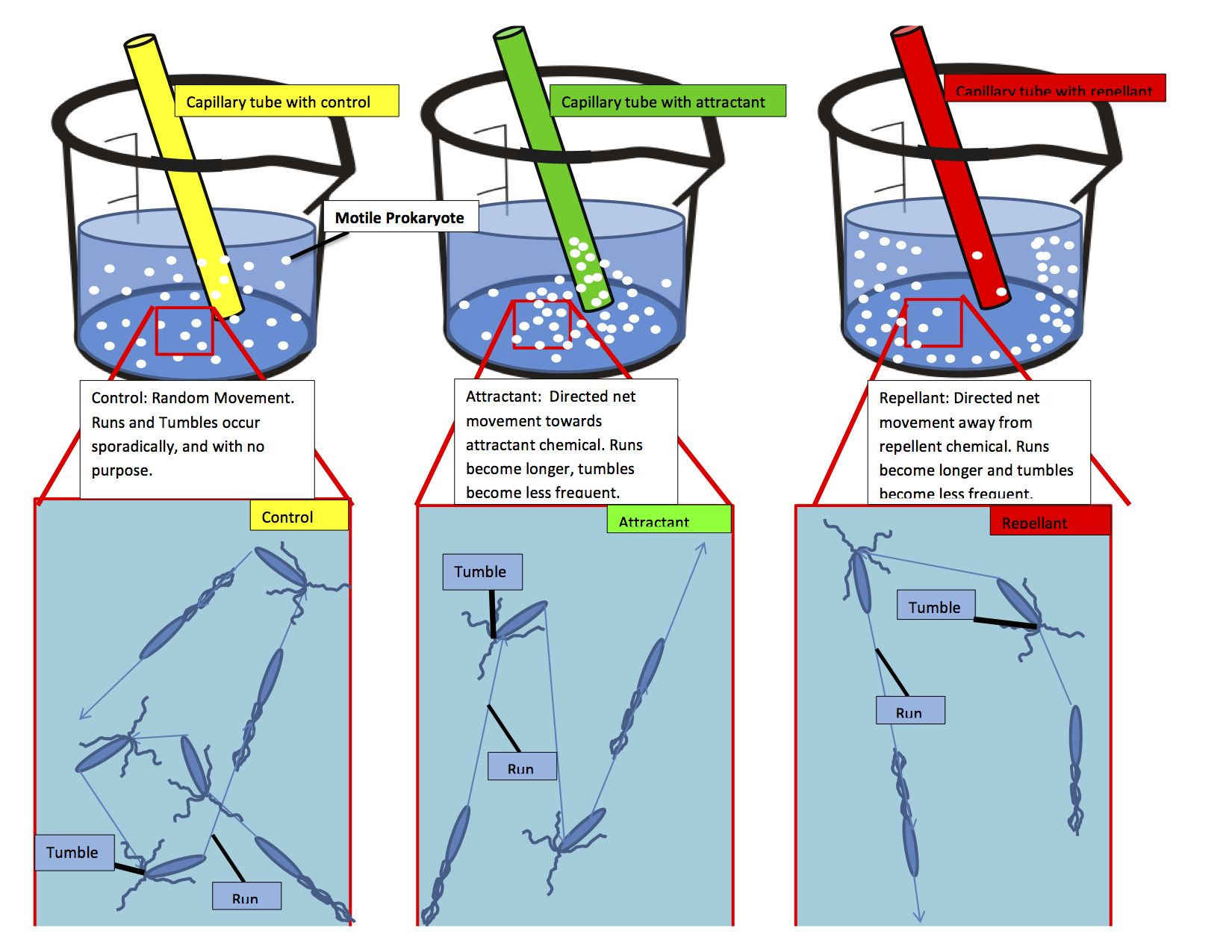
Capillary tube assay for chemotaxis. Motile prokaryotes sense chemicals in their environment and change their motility accordingly. Absent chemicals, movement is completely random. When an attractant or repellent is present, runs become longer and tumbles become less frequent. The result is net movement towards or away from the chemical (i.e., up or down the chemical gradient). The net movement can be seen in the beaker, where the bacteria accumulate around the origin of the attractant, and away from the origin of the repellent.

Chemotaxis (from chemo- + taxis) is the movement of an organism or entity in response to a chemical stimulus. Somatic cells, bacteria, and other single-cell or multicellular organisms direct their movements according to certain chemicals in their environment. This is important for bacteria to find food (e.g., glucose) by swimming toward the highest concentration of food molecules, or to flee from poisons (e.g., phenol). In multicellular organisms, chemotaxis is critical to early development (e.g., movement of sperm towards the egg during fertilization) and development (e.g., migration of neurons or lymphocytes) as well as in normal function and health (e.g., migration of leukocytes during injury or infection). In addition, it has been recognized that mechanisms that allow chemotaxis in animals can be subverted during cancer metastasis, and the aberrant change of the overall property of these networks, which control chemotaxis, can lead to carcinogenesis. The aberrant chemotaxis of leukocytes and lymphocytes also contribute to inflammatory diseases such as atherosclerosis, asthma, and arthritis. Sub-cellular components, such as the polarity patch generated by mating yeast, may also display chemotactic behavior.

Positive chemotaxis occurs if the movement is toward a higher concentration of the chemical in question; negative chemotaxis if the movement is in the opposite direction. Chemically prompted kinesis (randomly directed or nondirectional) can be called chemokinesis.

== History of chemotaxis research ==
Although migration of cells was detected from the early days of the development of microscopy by Leeuwenhoek, a Caltech lecture regarding chemotaxis propounds that 'erudite description of chemotaxis was only first made by T. W. Engelmann (1881) and W. F. Pfeffer (1884) in bacteria, and H. S. Jennings (1906) in ciliates'. The Nobel Prize laureate I. Metchnikoff also contributed to the study of the field during 1882 to 1886, with investigations of the process as an initial step of phagocytosis. The significance of chemotaxis in biology and clinical pathology was widely accepted in the 1930s, and the most fundamental definitions underlying the phenomenon were drafted by this time. The most important aspects in quality control of chemotaxis assays were described by H. Harris in the 1950s. In the 1960s and 1970s, the revolution of modern cell biology and biochemistry provided a series of novel techniques that became available to investigate the migratory responder cells and subcellular fractions responsible for chemotactic activity. The availability of this technology led to the discovery of C5a, a major chemotactic factor involved in acute inflammation. The pioneering works of J. Adler modernized Pfeffer's capillary assay and represented a significant turning point in understanding the whole process of intracellular signal transduction of bacteria.

== Bacterial chemotaxis ==
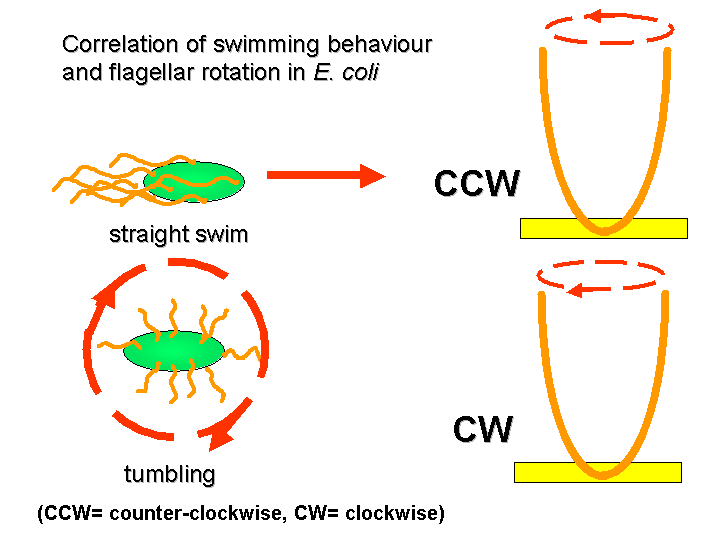
Correlation of swimming behaviour and flagellar rotation

Some bacteria, such as E. coli, have several flagella per cell (4–10 typically). These can rotate in two ways:

1. Counter-clockwise rotation aligns the flagella into a single rotating bundle, causing the bacterium to swim in a straight line; and
2. Clockwise rotation breaks the flagella bundle apart such that each flagellum points in a different direction, causing the bacterium to tumble in place.

The directions of rotation are given for an observer outside the cell looking down the flagella toward the cell.

=== Behavior ===
The overall movement of a bacterium is the result of alternating tumble and swim phases, called run-and-tumble motion. As a result, the trajectory of a bacterium swimming in a uniform environment will form a biased random walk with relatively straight swims interrupted by random tumbles that reorient the bacterium. By repeatedly evaluating their course, and adjusting if they are moving in the wrong direction, bacteria can direct their random walk motion toward favorable locations.

In the presence of a chemical gradient bacteria will chemotax, or direct their overall motion based on the gradient. If the bacterium senses that it is moving in the correct direction (toward attractant/away from repellent), it will keep swimming in a straight line for a longer time before tumbling; however, if it is moving in the wrong direction, it will tumble sooner. Peritrichous bacteria such as Escherichia coli use temporal sensing to decide whether their situation is improving or not, and in this way, find the location with the highest concentration of attractant, detecting even small differences in concentration. Salmonella typhimurium can also behave in this way, and also lophotrichous flagellated bacteria such as Pseudomonas putida, can actively influence the angular change between their swimming phases. As a result the swimming direction is biased in the direction of a better environmental condition for the bacteria. This could be advantageous for swimming in natural habitats such as tissue or soil, where the free path length is restricted and a bias in run length is ineffective.

For peritrichous flagellated bacteria, this biased random walk is a result of simply choosing between two methods of random movement; namely tumbling and straight swimming.

The helical nature of the individual flagellar filament is critical for this movement to occur. The protein structure that makes up the flagellar filament, flagellin, is conserved among all flagellated bacteria. Vertebrates seem to have taken advantage of this fact by possessing an immune receptor (TLR5) designed to recognize this conserved protein.

As in many instances in biology, there are bacteria that do not follow this rule. Many bacteria, such as Vibrio, are monoflagellated and have a single flagellum at one pole of the cell. Their method of chemotaxis is different. Others possess a single flagellum that is kept inside the cell wall. These bacteria move by spinning the whole cell, which is shaped like a corkscrew. Also lophotrichous flagellated bacteria such as Pseudomonas putida show different swimming modes.

=== Signal transduction ===
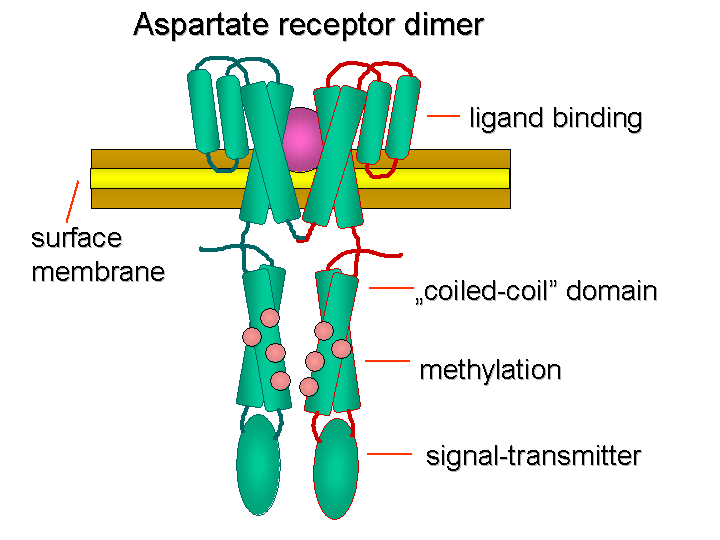
Domain structure of chemotaxis receptor for Asp

Chemical gradients are sensed through multiple transmembrane receptors, called methyl-accepting chemotaxis proteins (MACPs), which vary in the molecules that they detect. Thousands of MACP receptors are known to be encoded across the bacterial kingdom. These receptors may bind attractants or repellents directly or indirectly through interaction with proteins of periplasmatic space. The signals from these receptors are transmitted across the plasma membrane into the cytosol, where Che proteins are activated. The Che proteins alter the tumbling frequency, and alter the receptors.

==== Flagellum regulation ====
The proteins CheW and CheA bind to the receptor. The absence of receptor activation results in autophosphorylation in the histidine kinase, CheA, at a single highly conserved histidine residue. CheA, in turn, transfers phosphoryl groups to conserved aspartate residues in the response regulators CheB and CheY; CheA is a histidine kinase and it does not actively transfer the phosphoryl group, rather, the response regulator CheB takes the phosphoryl group from CheA. This mechanism of signal transduction is called a two-component system, and it is a common form of signal transduction in bacteria. CheY induces tumbling by interacting with the flagellar switch protein FliM, inducing a change from counter-clockwise to clockwise rotation of the flagellum. Change in the rotation state of a single flagellum can disrupt the entire flagella bundle and cause a tumble.

==== Receptor regulation ====
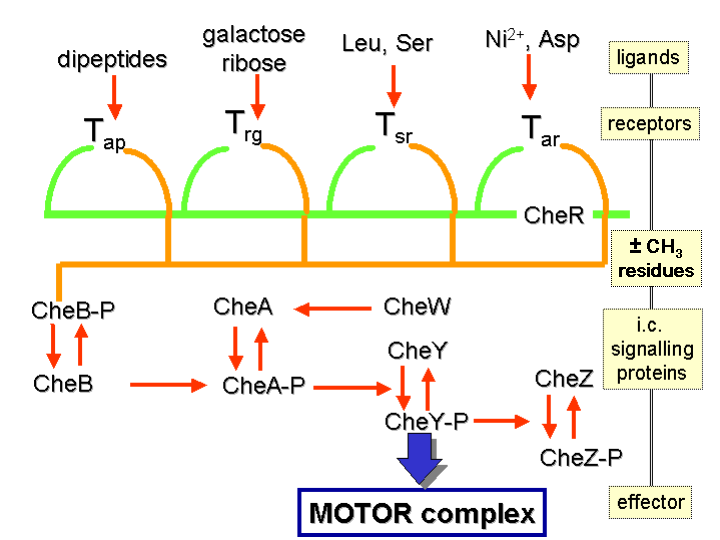
Signalling pathways of E.coli

CheB, when activated by CheA, acts as a methylesterase, removing methyl groups from glutamate residues on the cytosolic side of the receptor; it works antagonistically with CheR, a methyltransferase, which adds methyl residues to the same glutamate residues. If the level of an attractant remains high, the level of phosphorylation of CheA (and, therefore, CheY and CheB) will remain low, the cell will swim smoothly, and the level of methylation of the MCPs will increase (because CheB-P is not present to demethylate). The MCPs no longer respond to the attractant when they are fully methylated; therefore, even though the level of attractant might remain high, the level of CheA-P (and CheB-P) increases and the cell begins to tumble. The MCPs can be demethylated by CheB-P, and, when this happens, the receptors can once again respond to attractants. The situation is the opposite with regard to repellents: fully methylated MCPs respond best to repellents, while least-methylated MCPs respond worst to repellents. This regulation allows the bacterium to 'remember' chemical concentrations from the recent past, a few seconds, and compare them to those it is currently experiencing, thus 'know' whether it is traveling up or down a gradient. that bacteria have to chemical gradients, other mechanisms are involved in increasing the absolute value of the sensitivity on a given background. Well-established examples are the ultra-sensitive response of the motor to the CheY-P signal, and the clustering of chemoreceptors.

== Chemoattractants and chemorepellents ==
Chemoattractants and chemorepellents are inorganic or organic substances possessing chemotaxis-inducer effect in motile cells. These chemotactic ligands create chemical concentration gradients that organisms, prokaryotic and eukaryotic, move toward or away from, respectively.

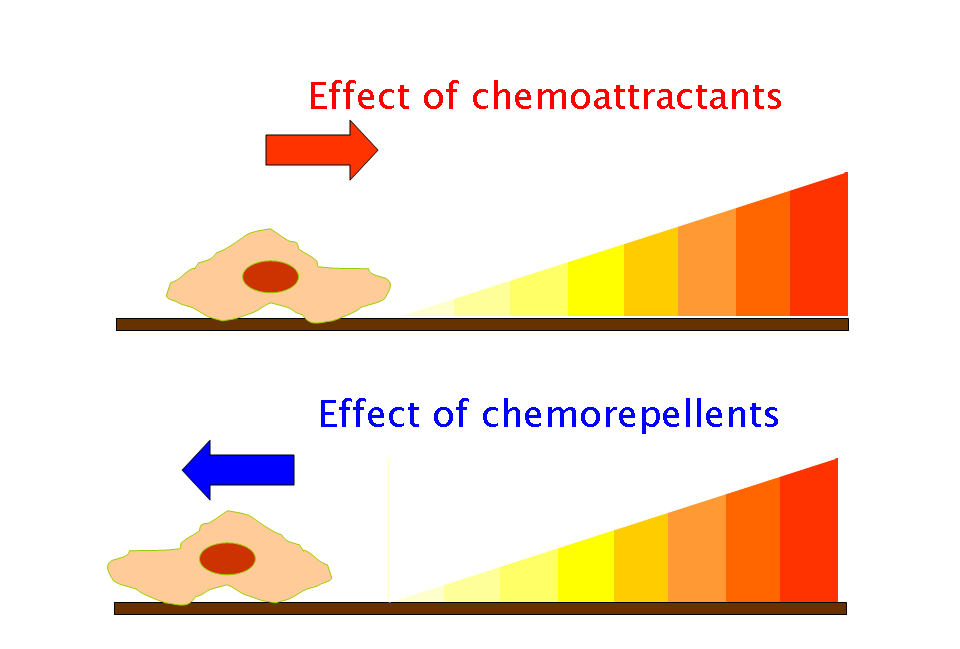
float

Effects of chemoattractants are elicited via chemoreceptors such as methyl-accepting chemotaxis proteins (MCP). MCPs in E.coli include Tar, Tsr, Trg and Tap. Chemoattracttants to Trg include ribose and galactose with phenol as a chemorepellent. Tap and Tsr recognize dipeptides and serine as chemoattractants, respectively.

Chemoattractants or chemorepellents bind MCPs at its extracellular domain; an intracellular signaling domain relays the changes in concentration of these chemotactic ligands to downstream proteins like that of CheA which then relays this signal to flagellar motors via phosphorylated CheY (CheY-P). CheY-P can then control flagellar rotation influencing the direction of cell motility.

For E.coli, S. meliloti, and R. spheroides, the binding of chemoattractants to MCPs inhibit CheA and therefore CheY-P activity, resulting in smooth runs, but for B. substilis, CheA activity increases. Methylation events in E.coli cause MCPs to have lower affinity to chemoattractants which causes increased activity of CheA and CheY-P resulting in tumbles. In this way cells are able to adapt to the immediate chemoattractant concentration and detect further changes to modulate cell motility.

Chemoattractants in eukaryotes are well characterized for immune cells. Formyl peptides, such as fMLF, attract leukocytes such as neutrophils and macrophages, causing movement toward infection sites. Non-acylated methioninyl peptides do not act as chemoattractants to neutrophils and macrophages. Leukocytes also move toward chemoattractants C5a, a complement component, and pathogen-specific ligands on bacteria.

Mechanisms concerning chemorepellents are less known than chemoattractants. Although chemorepellents work to confer an avoidance response in organisms, Tetrahymena thermophila adapt to a chemorepellent, Netrin-1 peptide, within 10 minutes of exposure; however, exposure to chemorepellents such as GTP, PACAP-38, and nociceptin show no such adaptations. GTP and ATP are chemorepellents in micro-molar concentrations to both Tetrahymena and Paramecium. These organisms avoid these molecules by producing avoiding reactions to re-orient themselves away from the gradient.

== Eukaryotic chemotaxis ==
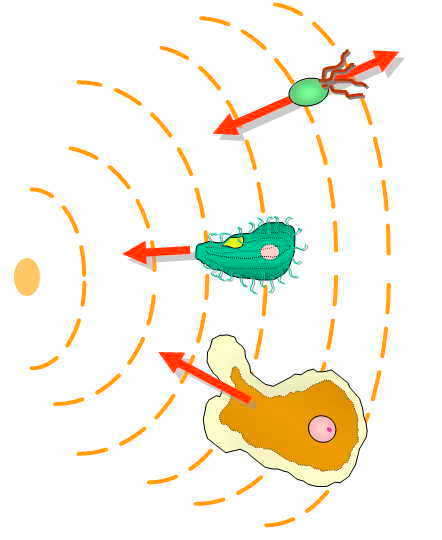
Difference of gradient sensing in prokaryotes and eukaryotes

The mechanism of chemotaxis that eukaryotic cells employ is quite different from that in the bacteria E. coli; however, sensing of chemical gradients is still a crucial step in the process. Due to their small size and other biophysical constraints, E. coli cannot directly detect a concentration gradient. Instead, they employ temporal gradient sensing, where they move over larger distances several times their own width and measure the rate at which perceived chemical concentration changes.

Eukaryotic cells are much larger than prokaryotes and have receptors embedded uniformly throughout the cell membrane. Eukaryotic chemotaxis involves detecting a concentration gradient spatially by comparing the asymmetric activation of these receptors at the different ends of the cell. Activation of these receptors results in migration towards chemoattractants, or away from chemorepellants. In mating yeast, which are non-motile, patches of polarity proteins on the cell cortex can relocate in a chemotactic fashion up pheromone gradients.

It has also been shown that both prokaryotic and eukaryotic cells are capable of chemotactic memory. In prokaryotes, this mechanism involves the methylation of receptors called methyl-accepting chemotaxis proteins (MCPs). This results in their desensitization and allows prokaryotes to "remember" and adapt to a chemical gradient. In contrast, chemotactic memory in eukaryotes can be explained by the Local Excitation Global Inhibition (LEGI) model. LEGI involves the balance between a fast excitation and delayed inhibition which controls downstream signaling such as Ras activation and PIP3 production.

Levels of receptors, intracellular signalling pathways and the effector mechanisms all represent diverse, eukaryotic-type components. In eukaryotic unicellular cells, amoeboid movement and cilium or the eukaryotic flagellum are the main effectors (e.g., Amoeba or Tetrahymena). Some eukaryotic cells of higher vertebrate origin, such as immune cells also move to where they need to be. Besides immune competent cells (granulocyte, monocyte, lymphocyte) a large group of cells—considered previously to be fixed into tissues—are also motile in special physiological (e.g., mast cell, fibroblast, endothelial cells) or pathological conditions (e.g., metastases). Chemotaxis has high significance in the early phases of embryogenesis as development of germ layers is guided by gradients of signal molecules.

=== Detection of a gradient of chemoattractant ===
The specific molecule/s that allow a eukaryotic cells detect a gradient of chemoattractant ligands (that is, a sort of the molecular compass that detects the direction of a chemoattractant) seems to change depending on the cell and chemoattractant receptor involved or even the concentration of the chemoattractant. However, these molecules apparently are activated independently of the motility of the cell. That is, even an immnobilized cell is still able to detect the direction of a chemoattractant. There appear to be mechanisms by which an external chemotactic gradient is sensed and turned into an intracellular Ras and PIP3 gradients, which results in a gradient and the activation of a signaling pathway, culminating in the polymerisation of actin filaments. The growing distal end of actin filaments develops connections with the internal surface of the plasma membrane via different sets of peptides and results in the formation of anterior pseudopods and posterior uropods. Cilia of eukaryotic cells can also produce chemotaxis; in this case, it is mainly a Ca^{2+}-dependent induction of the microtubular system of the basal body and the beat of the 9 + 2 microtubules within cilia. The orchestrated beating of hundreds of cilia is synchronized by a submembranous system built between basal bodies. The details of the signaling pathways are still not totally clear.

==== Chemotaxis-related migratory responses ====
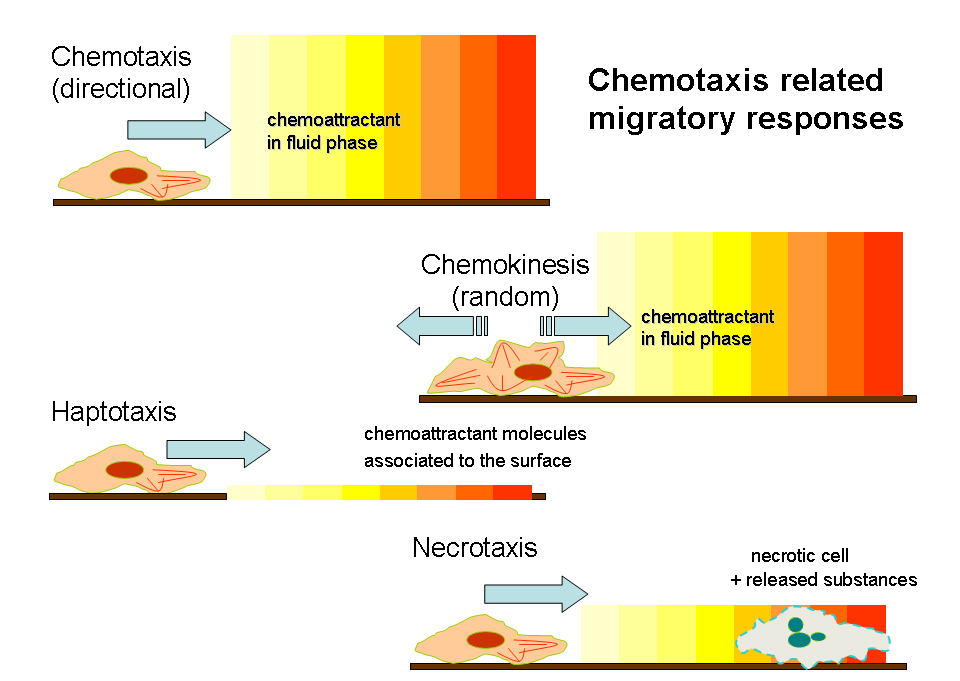
Chemotaxis related migratory responses

Chemotaxis refers to the directional migration of cells in response to chemical gradients; several variations of chemical-induced migration exist as listed below.

- Chemokinesis refers to an increase in cellular motility in response to chemicals in the surrounding environment. Unlike chemotaxis, the migration stimulated by chemokinesis lacks directionality, and instead increases environmental scanning behaviors.
- In haptotaxis the gradient of the chemoattractant is expressed or bound on a surface, in contrast to the classical model of chemotaxis, in which the gradient develops in a soluble fluid. The most common biologically active haptotactic surface is the extracellular matrix (ECM); the presence of bound ligands is responsible for induction of transendothelial migration and angiogenesis.
- Necrotaxis embodies a special type of chemotaxis when the chemoattractant molecules are released from necrotic or apoptotic cells. Depending on the chemical character of released substances, necrotaxis can accumulate or repel cells, which underlines the pathophysiological significance of this phenomenon.

=== Receptors ===
In general, eukaryotic cells sense the presence of chemotactic stimuli through the use of 7-transmembrane (or serpentine) heterotrimeric G protein-coupled receptors, a class representing a significant portion of the genome. Some members of this gene superfamily are used in eyesight (rhodopsins) as well as in olfaction (smelling). The main classes of chemotaxis receptors are triggered by:

- Formyl peptides - formyl peptide receptors (FPR),
- Chemokines - chemokine receptors (CCR or CXCR), and
- Leukotrienes - leukotriene receptors (BLT).

However, induction of a wide set of membrane receptors (e.g., cyclic nucleotides, amino acids, insulin, vasoactive peptides) also elicit migration of the cell.

==== Chemotactic selection ====
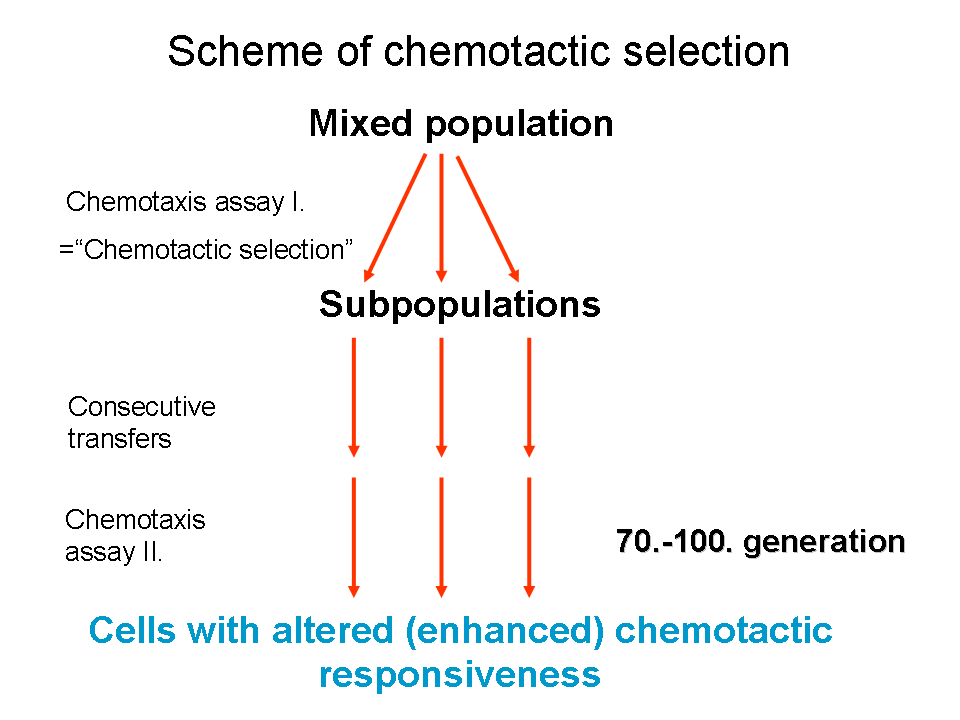
Chemotactic selection

While some chemotaxis receptors are expressed in the surface membrane with long-term characteristics, as they are determined genetically, others have short-term dynamics, as they are assembled ad hoc in the presence of the ligand. The diverse features of the chemotaxis receptors and ligands allows for the possibility of selecting chemotactic responder cells with a simple chemotaxis assay By chemotactic selection, we can determine whether a still-uncharacterized molecule acts via the long- or the short-term receptor pathway. The term chemotactic selection is also used to designate a technique that separates eukaryotic or prokaryotic cells according to their chemotactic responsiveness to selector ligands.

=== Chemotactic ligands ===
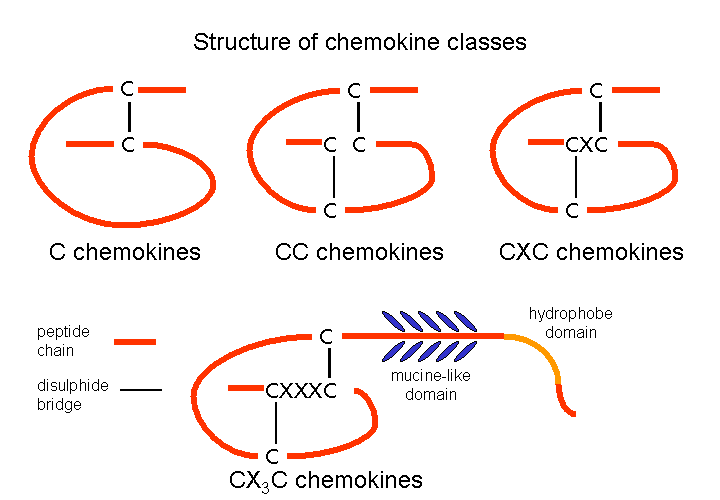
Structure of chemokine classes

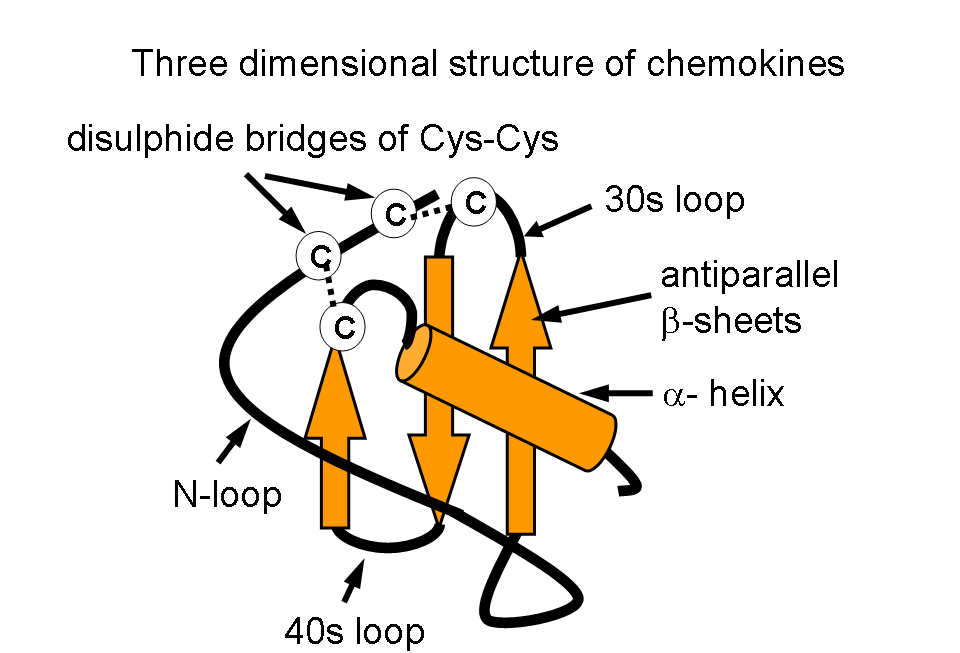
Three dimensional structure of chemokines

The number of molecules capable of eliciting chemotactic responses is relatively high, and we can distinguish primary and secondary chemotactic molecules. The main groups of the primary ligands are as follows:

- Formyl peptides are di-, tri-, tetrapeptides of bacterial origin, formylated on the N-terminus of the peptide. They are released from bacteria in vivo or after decomposition of the cell, a typical member of this group is the N-formylmethionyl-leucyl-phenylalanine (abbreviated fMLF or fMLP). Bacterial fMLF is a key component of inflammation and has characteristic chemoattractant effects in neutrophil granulocytes and monocytes. The chemotactic factor ligands and receptors related to formyl peptides are summarized in the related article, Formyl peptide receptors.
- Complement 3a (C3a) and complement 5a (C5a) are intermediate products of the complement cascade. Their synthesis is joined to the three alternative pathways (classical, lectin-dependent, and alternative) of complement activation by a convertase enzyme. The main target cells of these derivatives are neutrophil granulocytes and monocytes as well.
- Chemokines belong to a special class of cytokines; not only do their groups (C, CC, CXC, CX_{3}C chemokines) represent structurally related molecules with a special arrangement of disulfide bridges but also their target cell specificity is diverse. CC chemokines act on monocytes (e.g., RANTES), and CXC chemokines are neutrophil granulocyte-specific (e.g., IL-8). Investigations of the three-dimensional structures of chemokines provided evidence that a characteristic composition of beta-sheets and an alpha helix provides expression of sequences required for interaction with the chemokine receptors. Formation of dimers and their increased biological activity was demonstrated by crystallography of several chemokines, e.g. IL-8.
- Metabolites of polyunsaturated fatty acids
  - Leukotrienes are eicosanoid lipid mediators made by the metabolism of arachidonic acid by ALOX5 (also termed 5-lipoxygenase). Their most prominent member with chemotactic factor activity is leukotriene B4, which elicits adhesion, chemotaxis, and aggregation of leukocytes. The chemoattractant action of LTB4 is induced via either of two G protein–coupled receptors, BLT1 and BLT2, which are highly expressed in cells involved in inflammation and allergy.
  - The family of 5-Hydroxyicosatetraenoic acid eicosanoids are arachidonic acid metabolites also formed by ALOX5. Three members of the family form naturally and have prominent chemotactic activity. These, listed in order of decreasing potency, are: 5-oxo-eicosatetraenoic acid, 5-oxo-15-hydroxy-eicosatetraenoic acid, and 5-Hydroxyeicosatetraenoic acid. This family of agonists stimulates chemotactic responses in human eosinophils, neutrophils, and monocytes by binding to the Oxoeicosanoid receptor 1, which like the receptors for leukotriene B4, is a G protein-coupled receptor. Aside from the skin, neutrophils are the body's first line of defense against bacterial infections. After leaving nearby blood vessels, these cells recognize chemicals produced by bacteria in a cut or scratch and migrate "toward the smell".
  - 5-hydroxyeicosatrienoic acid and 5-oxoeicosatrienoic acid are metabolites of Mead acid (5Z,8Z,11Z-eicosatrirenoid acid); they stimulate leukocyte chemotaxis through the oxoeicosanoid receptor 1 with 5-oxoeicosatrienoic acid being as potent as its arachidonic acid-derived analog, 5-oxo-eicosatetraenoic acid, in stimulating human blood eosinophil and neutrophil chemotaxis.
  - 12-Hydroxyeicosatetraenoic acid is an eicosanoid metabolite of arachidonic acid made by ALOX12 which stimulates leukocyte chemotaxis through the leukotriene B4 receptor, BLT2.
  - Prostaglandin D2 is an eicosanoid metabolite of arachidononic acid made by cyclooxygenase 1 or cyclooxygenase 2 that stimulates chemotaxis through the Prostaglandin DP2 receptor. It elicits chemotactic responses in eosinophils, basophils, and T helper cells of the Th2 subtype.
  - 12-Hydroxyheptadecatrienoic acid is a non-eicosanoid metabolite of arachidonic acid made by cyclooxygenase 1 or cyclooxygenase 2 that stimulates leukocyte chemotaxis though the leukotriene B4 receptor, BLT2.
  - 15-oxo-eicosatetraenoic acid is an eicosanoid metabolite of arachidonic acid made my ALOX15; it has weak chemotactic activity for human monocytes (sees 15-Hydroxyeicosatetraenoic acid#15-oxo-ETE). The receptor or other mechanism by which this metabolite stimulates chemotaxis has not been elucidated.

==== Chemotactic range fitting ====
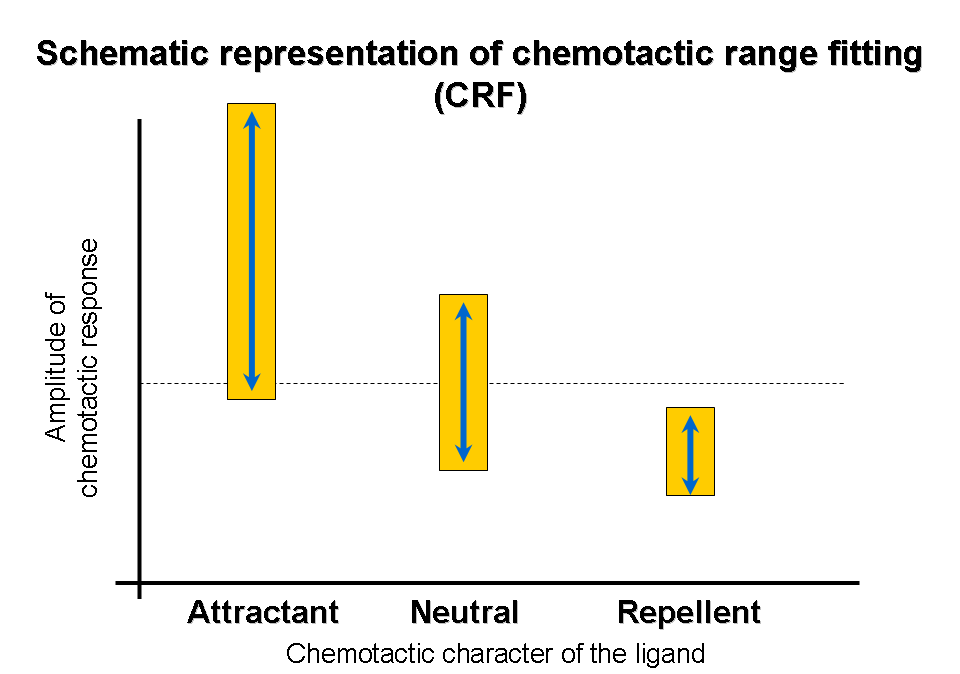
Chemotactic range fitting

Chemotactic responses elicited by ligand-receptor interactions vary with the concentration of the ligand. Investigations of ligand families (e.g. amino acids or oligopeptides) demonstrates that chemoattractant activity occurs over a wide range, while chemorepellent activities have narrow ranges.

== Collective chemotaxis ==
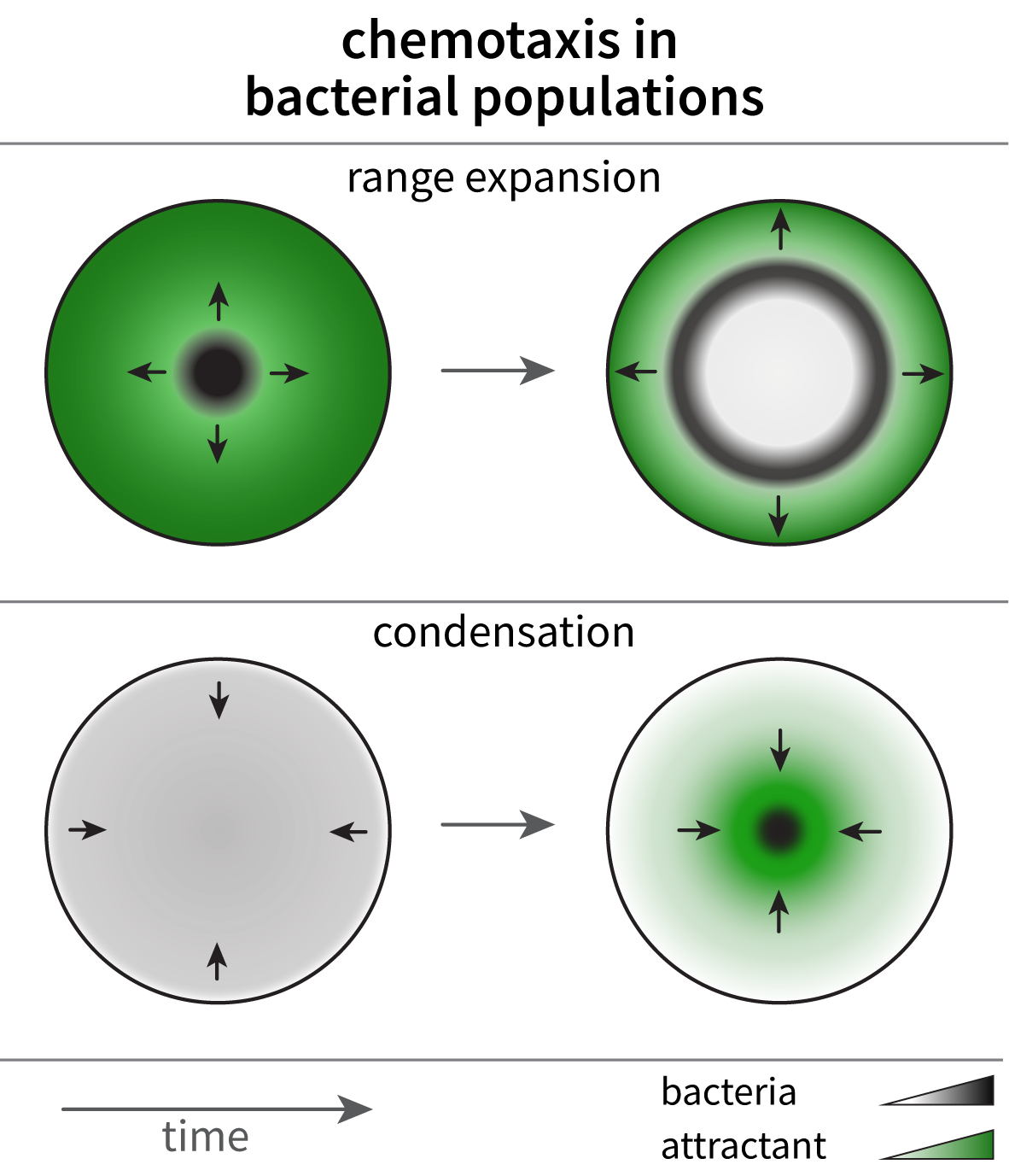
Collective chemotaxis in bacteria

While cells can respond to pre-existing chemical gradients, they can also perform chemotaxis collectively by modifying the chemical environment and responding to the self-generated gradients. Consumption of chemoattractants leads to gradients pointing in the direction with lowest cell density; by following these self-generated gradients cells expand into fresh territories (a process termed 'range expansion'). In addition to range expansion, bacteria may also use chemotaxis to attract others and condense by either secreting chemoattractants or by removing chemorepellents. Both mechanisms lead to auto-attraction between cells and may lead to microscopic aggregates or macroscopic condensates and pattern formation.

== Clinical significance ==
A changed migratory potential of cells has relatively high importance in the development of several clinical symptoms and syndromes. Altered chemotactic activity of extracellular (e.g., Escherichia coli) or intracellular (e.g., Listeria monocytogenes) pathogens itself represents a significant clinical target. Modification of endogenous chemotactic ability of these microorganisms by pharmaceutical agents can decrease or inhibit the ratio of infections or spreading of infectious diseases. Apart from infections, there are some other diseases wherein impaired chemotaxis is the primary etiological factor, as in Chédiak–Higashi syndrome, where giant intracellular vesicles inhibit normal migration of cells.

Chemotaxis in diseases
Type of disease	Chemotaxis increased	Chemotaxis decreased
Infections	Inflammations	AIDS, Brucellosis
Chemotaxis results in the disease	—	Chédiak–Higashi syndrome, Kartagener syndrome
Chemotaxis is affected	Atherosclerosis, arthritis, periodontitis, psoriasis, reperfusion injury, metastatic tumors	Multiple sclerosis, Hodgkin disease, male infertility
Intoxications	Asbestos, benzpyrene	Hg and Cr salts, ozone

== Mathematical models ==
Several mathematical models of chemotaxis were developed depending on the type of

- Migration (e.g., basic differences of bacterial swimming, movement of unicellular eukaryotes with cilia/flagellum and amoeboid migration)
- Physico-chemical characteristics of the chemicals (e.g., diffusion) working as ligands
- Biological characteristics of the ligands (attractant, neutral, and repellent molecules)
- Assay systems applied to evaluate chemotaxis (see incubation times, development, and stability of concentration gradients)
- Other environmental effects possessing direct or indirect influence on the migration (lighting, temperature, magnetic fields, etc.)

Although interactions of the factors listed above make the behavior of the solutions of mathematical models of chemotaxis rather complex, it is possible to describe the basic phenomenon of chemotaxis-driven motion in a straightforward way. Indeed, let us denote with $\varphi$ the spatially non-uniform concentration of the chemo-attractant and $\nabla \varphi$ as its gradient. Then the chemotactic cellular flow (also called current) ${\bf J}$ that is generated by the chemotaxis is linked to the above gradient by the law:

${\bf J} = C \chi(\varphi) \nabla\varphi$

where $C$ is the spatial density of the cells and $\chi$ is the so-called 'Chemotactic coefficient' - $\chi$ is often not constant, but a decreasing function of the chemo-attractant. For some quantity $\rho$ that is subject to total flux ${\bf J}$ and generation/destruction term $S$, it is possible to formulate a continuity equation:

$${\partial \rho\over{\partial t}} + \nabla \cdot {\bf J} = S$$

where $\nabla \cdot ()$ is the divergence. This general equation applies to both the cell density and the chemo-attractant. Therefore, incorporating a diffusion flux into the total flux term, the interactions between these quantities are governed by a set of coupled reaction-diffusion partial differential equations describing the change in $C$ and $\varphi$:

$$\begin{aligned}
{\partial C\over{\partial t}} &= f(C) + \nabla\cdot \left[D_{C}\nabla C - C\chi(\varphi)\nabla\varphi \right ] \\
{\partial \varphi\over{\partial t}} &= g(\varphi,C) + \nabla \cdot (D_{\varphi}\nabla\varphi)
\end{aligned}$$

where $f(C)$ describes the growth in cell density, $g(\varphi,C)$ is the kinetics/source term for the chemo-attractant, and the diffusion coefficients for cell density and the chemo-attractant are respectively $D_{C}$ and $D_{\varphi}$.

Spatial ecology of soil microorganisms is a function of their chemotactic sensitivities towards substrate and fellow organisms. The chemotactic behavior of the bacteria was proven to lead to non-trivial population patterns even in the absence of environmental heterogeneities. The presence of structural pore scale heterogeneities has an extra impact on the emerging bacterial patterns.

== Measurement of chemotaxis ==
A wide range of techniques is available to evaluate chemotactic activity of cells or the chemoattractant and chemorepellent character of ligands. The basic requirements of the measurement are as follows:

- Concentration gradients can develop relatively quickly and persist for a long time in the system
- Chemotactic and chemokinetic activities are distinguished
- Migration of cells is free toward and away on the axis of the concentration gradient
- Detected responses are the results of active migration of cells

Despite the fact that an ideal chemotaxis assay is still not available, there are several protocols and pieces of equipment that offer good correspondence with the conditions described above. The most commonly used are summarised in the table below:

- Agar-plate assays
  - PP-chamber
- Two-chamber assays
  - Boyden chamber
  - Zigmond chamber
  - Dunn chambers
  - Multi-well chambers
  - Capillary techniques
- Others
  - T-maze technique
  - Opalescence technique
  - Orientation assays

== Artificial chemotactic systems ==
Chemical robots that use artificial chemotaxis to navigate autonomously have been designed. Applications include targeted delivery of drugs in the body. More recently, enzyme molecules have also shown positive chemotactic behavior in the gradient of their substrates. The thermodynamically favorable binding of enzymes to their specific substrates is recognized as the origin of enzymatic chemotaxis. Additionally, enzymes in cascades have also shown substrate-driven chemotactic aggregation.

Apart from active enzymes, non-reacting molecules also show chemotactic behavior. This has been demonstrated by using dye molecules that move directionally in gradients of polymer solution through favorable hydrophobic interactions.

== See also ==
- McCutcheon index
- Tropism
- Durotaxis
- Haptotaxis
- Mechanotaxis
- Plithotaxis
- Thin layers (oceanography)
