= Tipelukast =

Names
- IUPAC name 4-[6-acetyl-3-[3-(4-acetyl-3-hydroxy-2-propylphenyl)sulfanylpropoxy]-2-propylphenoxy]butanoic acid
- Other names KCA 757; MN-001

Identifiers
CAS Number	125961-82-2
3D model (JSmol)	Interactive image
ChEBI	CHEBI:177735
ChEMBL	ChEMBL2104988
ChemSpider	8068898
DrugBank	DB12435
KEGG	D06659
PubChem CID	9893228
UNII	08379P260O
CompTox Dashboard (EPA)	DTXSID00925325
- InChI: InChI=1S/C29H38O7S/c1-5-9-23-25(14-12-22(20(4)31)29(23)36-16-7-11-27(32)33)35-17-8-18-37-26-15-13-21(19(3)30)28(34)24(26)10-6-2/h12-15,34H,5-11,16-18H2,1-4H3,(H,32,33) Key: KPWYNAGOBXLMSE-UHFFFAOYSA-N
- SMILES: CCCC1=C(C=CC(=C1OCCCC(=O)O)C(=O)C)OCCCSC2=C(C(=C(C=C2)C(=O)C)O)CCC

Properties
Chemical formula	C_{29}H_{38}O_{7}S
Molar mass	530.68 g·mol^{−1}
- Except where otherwise noted, data are given for materials in their standard state (at 25 °C [77 °F], 100 kPa). Infobox references

Tipelukast (KCA 757 or MN-001) is a sulfidopeptide leukotriene receptor antagonist with suspected anti-inflammatory properties. It is developed by MediciNova.
