= AM-679 =

There are two chemical compounds used in scientific research which have been assigned the code number AM-679, invented by teams led by Alexandros Makriyannis and Alla Musiyenko respectively.

- AM-679 (cannabinoid)
- AM-679 (FLAP inhibitor)
