= Protein-glutamate methylesterase =

protein-glutamate methylesterase

Identifiers
- EC no.: 3.1.1.61
- CAS no.: 93792-01-9

Databases
- BRENDA: enzyme data
- ExPASy: NiceZyme view
- KEGG: enzyme entry
- MetaCyc: metabolic pathway
- Rhea: reactions
- PDB structures: RCSB PDB PDBe PDBsum
- Gene Ontology: AmiGO / QuickGO
Search
- PMC: articles
- PubMed: articles
- NCBI: proteins

CheB_methylest
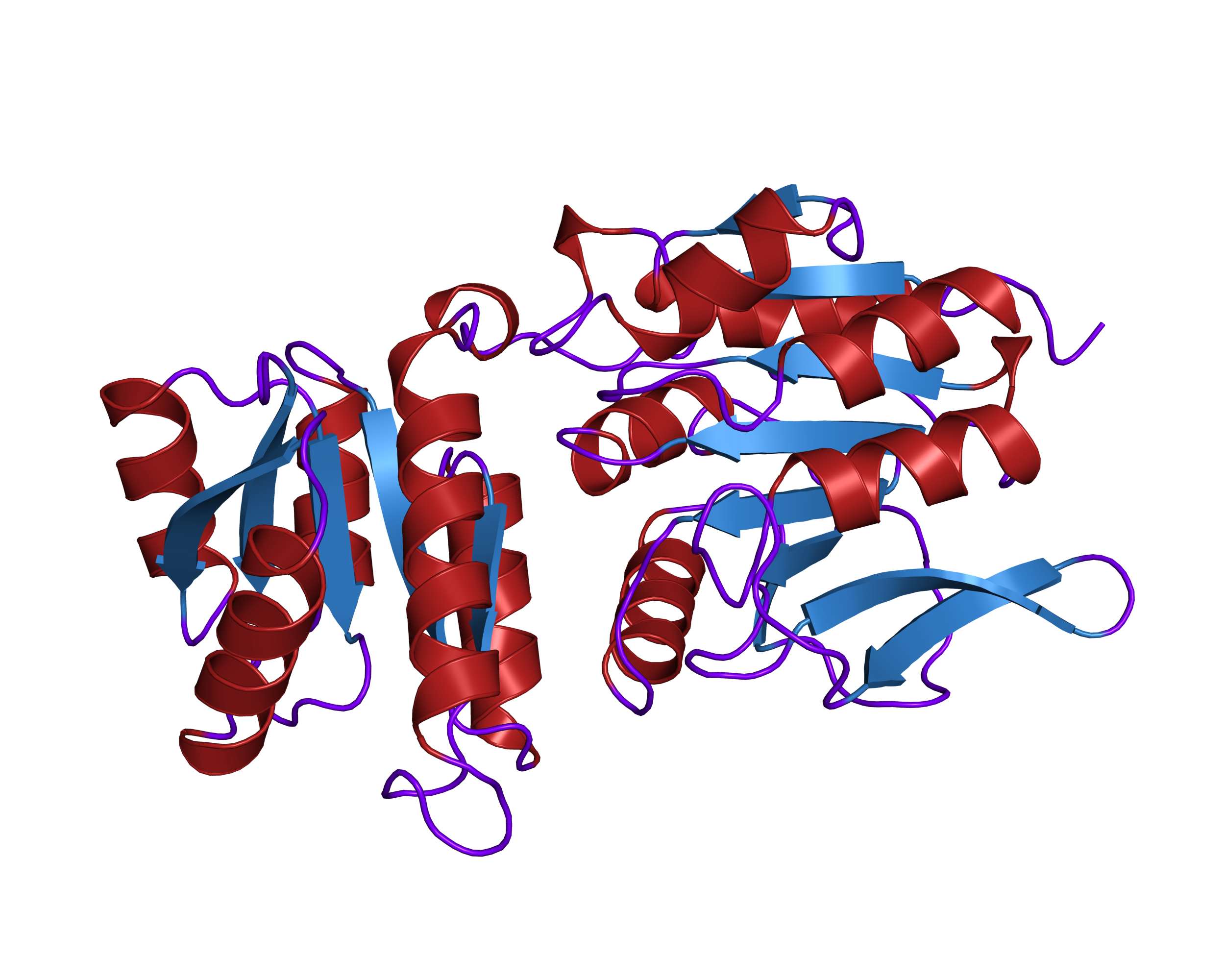
- structural basis for methylesterase cheb regulation by a phosphorylation-activated domain

Identifiers
- Symbol: CheB_methylest
- Pfam: PF01339
- InterPro: IPR000673
- SCOP2: 1chd / SCOPe / SUPFAM
Available protein structures:
- PDB: IPR000673 PF01339 (ECOD; PDBsum)
- AlphaFold: IPR000673; PF01339

The enzyme protein-glutamate methylesterase (EC 3.1.1.61) catalyzes the reaction

protein L-glutamate O^{5}-methyl ester + H_{2}O $\rightleftharpoons$ protein L-glutamate + methanol

This enzyme is a demethylase, and more specifically it belongs to the family of hydrolases, specifically those acting on carboxylic ester bonds. The systematic name is protein-Lglutamate-O^{5}-methyl-ester acylhydrolase. Other names in common use include chemotaxis-specific methylesterase, methyl-accepting chemotaxis protein methyl-esterase, CheB methylesterase, methylesterase CheB, protein methyl-esterase, protein carboxyl methylesterase, PME, protein methylesterase, and protein-L-glutamate-5-O-methyl-ester acylhydrolase. This enzyme participates in 3 metabolic pathways: two-component system - general, bacterial chemotaxis - general, and bacterial chemotaxis - organism-specific.

CheB is part of a two-component signal transduction system. These systems enable bacteria to sense, respond, and adapt to a wide range of environments, stressors, and growth conditions. Two-component systems are composed of a sensor histidine kinase (HK) and its cognate response regulator (RR). The HK catalyses its own autophosphorylation followed by the transfer of the phosphoryl group to the receiver domain on RR; phosphorylation of the RR usually activates an attached output domain, in this case a methyltransferase domain.

CheB is involved in chemotaxis. CheB methylesterase is responsible for removing the methyl group from the gamma-glutamyl methyl ester residues in the methyl-accepting chemotaxis proteins (MCP). CheB is regulated through phosphorylation by CheA. The N-terminal region of the protein is similar to that of other regulatory components of sensory transduction systems.

== Structural studies ==
As of late 2007, two structures have been solved for this class of enzymes, with PDB accession codes PDB: 1A2O and PDB: 1CHD.
