= Chemotactic selection =

Chemotaxis receptors are expressed in the surface membrane with diverse dynamics, some of them have long-term characteristics as they are determined genetically, others have short-term moiety as their assembly is induced ad hoc in the presence of the ligand. The diverse feature of the chemotaxis receptors and ligands provides the possibility to select chemotactic responder cells with a simple chemotaxis assay. By chemotactic selection we can determine whether a still not characterized molecule acts via the long- or the short-term receptor pathway. Recent results proved that chemokines (e.g. IL-8, RANTES) are working on long-term chemotaxis receptors, while vasoactive peptides (e.g. endothelin) act more on the short-term ones. Term chemotactic selection is also used to design a technique which separates eukaryotic or prokaryotic cells upon their chemotactic responsiveness to selector ligands.

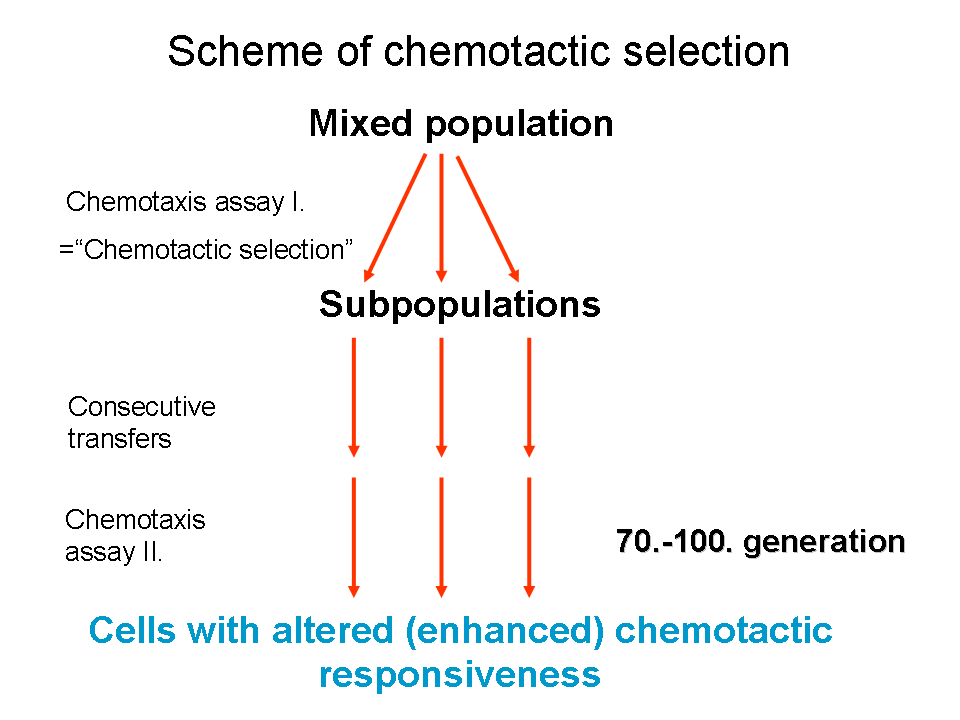
Chemotactic selection

== General references ==
- Kohidai L and Csaba G (1988). "Chemotaxis and chemotactic selection induced with cytokines (IL-8, RANTES and TNF alpha) in the unicellular Tetrahymena pyriformis". Cytokine. 10 (7): 481–6. doi:10.1006/cyto.1997.0328. PMID 9702410.
