= Antileukotriene =

Medication class that inhibits leukotriene synthesis and/or activity

Antileukotrienes
- Drug class

Class identifiers
- Synonyms: Leukotriene modifier; Leukotriene receptor antagonist
- Mechanism of action: • Enzyme inhibition • Receptor antagonism
- Biological target: • Enzymes: 5-LOX; FLAP • Receptors: CysLTRs

Legal status

An antileukotriene, also known as leukotriene modifier and leukotriene receptor antagonist, is a medication which functions as a leukotriene-related enzyme inhibitor (arachidonate 5-lipoxygenase) or leukotriene receptor antagonist (cysteinyl leukotriene receptors) and consequently opposes the function of these inflammatory mediators; leukotrienes are produced by the immune system and serve to promote bronchoconstriction, inflammation, microvascular permeability, and mucus secretion in asthma and COPD. Leukotriene receptor antagonists are sometimes colloquially referred to as leukasts.

Leukotriene receptor antagonists, such as montelukast, zafirlukast, and pranlukast, and 5-lipoxygenase inhibitors, like zileuton and Hypericum perforatum, can be used to treat these diseases. They are less effective than corticosteroids for treating asthma, but more effective for treating certain mast cell disorders.

== Approaches ==
There are two main approaches to block the actions of leukotrienes.

=== Inhibition of the 5-lipoxygenase pathway ===
Drugs that inhibit the enzyme 5-lipoxygenase will inhibit the synthetic pathway of leukotriene metabolism; drugs such as MK-886 that block the 5-lipoxygenase activating protein (FLAP) inhibit functioning of 5-lipoxygenase and may help in treating atherosclerosis.

Examples of 5-LOX inhibitors include drugs, such as meclofenamate sodium and zileuton.

Some chemicals found in trace amounts in food, and some dietary supplements, also have been shown to inhibit 5-LOX, such as baicalein, caffeic acid, curcumin, hyperforin and St John's wort.

=== Antagonism of cysteinyl-leukotriene type 1 receptors ===
Agents such as montelukast and zafirlukast block the actions of cysteinyl leukotrienes at the CysLT1 receptor on target cells such as bronchial smooth muscle via receptor antagonism.

These modifiers have been shown to improve asthma symptoms, reduce asthma exacerbations and limit markers of inflammation such as eosinophil counts in the peripheral blood and bronchoalveolar lavage fluid. This demonstrates that they have anti-inflammatory properties.

== See also ==
- Antihistamine
