= Photoleukomelanodermatitis of Kobori =

- Specialty: Dermatology

Photoleukomelanodermatitis of Kobori is a cutaneous condition, a dyschromic drug eruption that occurs after ingestion of afloqualone, thiazides or tetracyclines, followed by exposure to sunlight.

== See also ==
- Leukotriene receptor antagonist-associated Churg–Strauss syndrome
- List of cutaneous conditions
