= AM-679 (FLAP inhibitor) =

Chemical compound

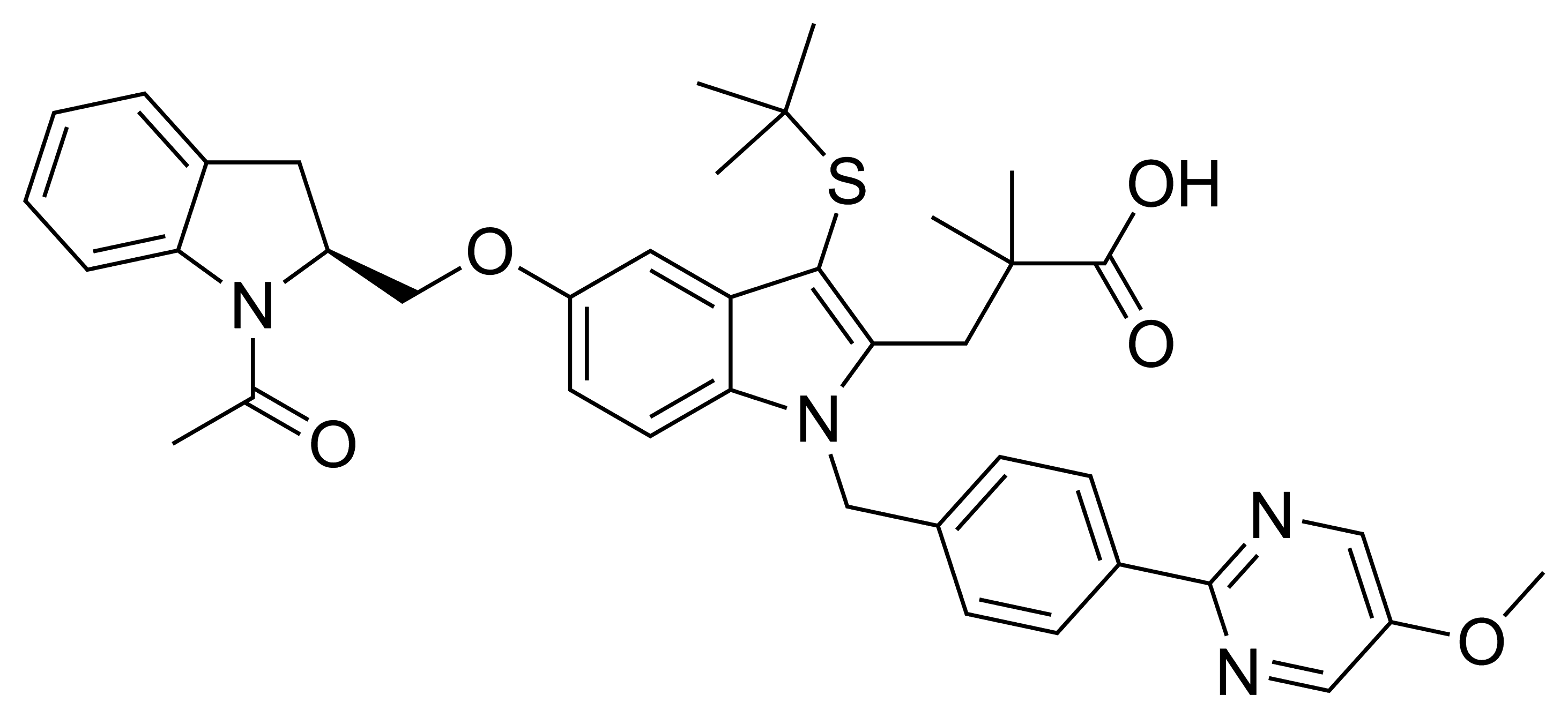

Identifiers
- IUPAC name: 3-(5-[(S)-1-acetyl-2,3-dihydro-1H-indol-2-ylmethoxy]-3-t-butylsulfanyl-1-[4-(5-methoxypyrimidin-2-yl)benzyl]-1H-indol-2-yl)-2,2-dimethylpropionic acid
- CAS Number: 1206880-66-1
- PubChem CID: 44627267
- ChemSpider: 25991470
- UNII: 65KJ8P7M9D

Chemical and physical data
- Formula: C_{40}H_{44}N_{4}O_{5}S
- Molar mass: 692.88 g·mol^{−1}
- 3D model (JSmol): Interactive image
- SMILES: n5cc(OC)cnc5-c6ccc(cc6)Cn(c1CC(C)(C)C(=O)O)c4ccc(cc4c1SC(C)(C)C)OCC3Cc2ccccc2N3C(=O)C
- InChI: InChI=1S/C39H42N4O5S/c1-24(44)43-28(18-27-10-8-9-11-32(27)43)23-48-29-16-17-33-31(19-29)34(49-38(2,3)4)35(39(5,6)37(45)46)42(33)22-25-12-14-26(15-13-25)36-40-20-30(47-7)21-41-36/h8-17,19-21,28H,18,22-23H2,1-7H3,(H,45,46)/t28-/m0/s1; Key:XTSOSRWDZSKOSB-NDEPHWFRSA-N

AM-679 is a drug which acts as a selective inhibitor of 5-Lipoxygenase-activating protein (FLAP). This protein is involved in the production of cysteinyl leukotrienes which are involved in inflammation, and AM-679 has anti-inflammatory effects in animal studies.
