= Leukotriene B4 receptor =

Transmembrane receptor

The leukotriene B4 receptors (BLTRs) include the following two receptors:

- Leukotriene B4 receptor 1 (BLTR1)
- Leukotriene B4 receptor 2 (BLTR2)

== See also ==
- Eicosanoid receptor
- Leukotriene receptor
