= MK-886 =

Names
- Preferred IUPAC name 3-{3-(tert-Butylsulfanyl)-1-[(4-chlorophenyl)methyl]-5-(propan-2-yl)-1H-indol-2-yl}-2,2-dimethylpropanoic acid
- Other names L-663536

Identifiers
CAS Number	118414-82-7
3D model (JSmol)	Interactive image
ChEBI	CHEBI:75390
ChEMBL	ChEMBL29097
ChemSpider	2885052
DrugBank	DB16739
MeSH	L+663536
PubChem CID	3651377
UNII	080626SQ8C
CompTox Dashboard (EPA)	DTXSID5041067
- InChI: InChI=1S/C27H34ClNO2S/c1-17(2)19-10-13-22-21(14-19)24(32-26(3,4)5)23(15-27(6,7)25(30)31)29(22)16-18-8-11-20(28)12-9-18/h8-14,17H,15-16H2,1-7H3,(H,30,31) Key: QAOAOVKBIIKRNL-UHFFFAOYSA-N
- SMILES: CC(C)C1=CC2=C(C=C1)N(C(=C2SC(C)(C)C)CC(C)(C)C(=O)O)CC3=CC=C(C=C3)Cl

Properties
Chemical formula	C_{27}H_{34}ClNO_{2}S
Molar mass	472.083
- Except where otherwise noted, data are given for materials in their standard state (at 25 °C [77 °F], 100 kPa). verify (what is ?) Infobox references

MK-886, or L-663536, is a leukotriene antagonist. It may perform this by blocking the 5-lipoxygenase activating protein (FLAP), thus inhibiting 5-lipoxygenase (5-LOX), and may help in treating atherosclerosis.

MK-886 is a synthesized chemical compound known for its role in inhibiting the 5-lipoxygenase-activating protein (FLAP). Key part in leukotriene biosynthesis. It has potential therapeutic applications in different types of cancer when paired up with other synthetically made chemical compounds. This includes the cancer cells doing apoptosis and suppress tumor cell growth independent from leukotriene inhibition with some cases.

== Mechanism of action ==
Originally MK-886 was made as a FLAP inhibitor which has some interference with the leukotriene pathway. This is done by blocking 5-lipoxygenase which is an enzyme which aids in the synthesis of pro-inflammatory leukotrienes which is linked to some inflammatory diseases and cancers.

== Cancer research and apoptosis ==
Several studies have shown the anti-cancer potential of MK-886. In a 2004 study MK-886 was shown to induce apoptosis in gastric cancer cells through the upregulation of the pro-apoptotic proteins p27^kip1 and Bax. This shows that the compound may promote cell death through a pathway that is at least partially independent of its role in leukotriene inhibition.

In another study from 2007 researchers investigated the combined inhibition of 5-lipoxygenase and cyclooxygenase-2 (COX-2) in premalignant and malignant lung cell lines. MK-886 when combined with a COX-2 inhibitor significantly enhanced growth arrest and cell death. This shows a synergistic effect when targeting multiple inflammatory pathways in cancer therapy.

== Therapeutic potential ==
Due to its ability to both function in inflammatory and apoptotic pathways MK-886 has gained some recognition as a therapeutic agent for not a solo case of inflammatory diseases but also for cancers where leukotriene signaling, specially, helps to promote the tumors survival and growth.
