= McCutcheon index =

The McCutcheon index or chemotactic ratio is a numerical metric that quantifies the efficiency of movement. It is calculated as the ratio of the net displacement of a moving entity to the total length of the path it has traveled.

$$\text{McCutcheon index}= {\text{Displacement}\over \text{Distance}}.$$

The index acts as an evaluative measure of the directness of movement. A value close to 1 indicates that a moving entity performed its movement in a very direct manner, minimizing detours. On the other hand, a lower value indicates that the entity has achieved only a marginal net displacement, despite traveling a considerable distance. The index is used to evaluate movements of, for example, leukocytes, bacteria, or amoebae.

It is named after Morton McCutcheon who introduced it to describe chemotaxis in leukocytes.

A metric that is closely related to the McCutcheon index is Tortuosity.
