= Chemotaxis assay =

Experimental tools for evaluation of chemotactic ability of cells

The process of chemotaxis can be demonstrated using a capillary tube assay (shown above). The motile prokaryotes can sense chemicals in their environment and change their motility accordingly. When no chemicals are present, movement is completely random. When a repellent or attractant chemical is present, the motility changes; runs become longer and tumbles become less frequent so that the net movement towards or away from the chemical can be achieved. The net movement can be seen in the beaker, where the bacteria accumulate around the attractant, and away from the repellent

Chemotaxis assays are experimental tools for the evaluation of the chemotactic ability of prokaryotic or eukaryotic cells. A wide variety of techniques have been developed. Some techniques are qualitative - allowing an investigator to approximately determine a cell's chemotactic affinity for an analyte - while others are quantitative, allowing a precise measurement of this affinity.

== Quality control ==
In general, the most important requisite is to calibrate the incubation time of the assay both to the model cell and the ligand to be evaluated. Too short incubation time results in no cells in the sample, while too long time perturbs the concentration gradients and measures more chemokinetic than chemotactic responses.

The most commonly used techniques are grouped into two main groups:

== Agar-plate techniques ==
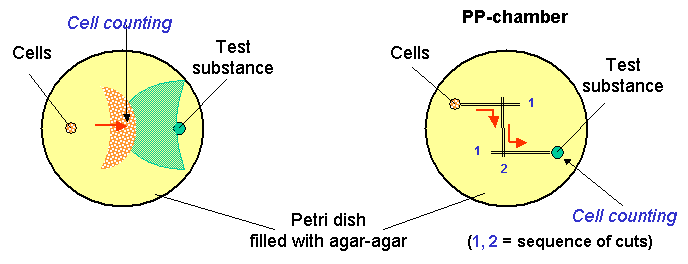
Chemotaxis assays with agar plates

This way of evaluation deals with agar-agar or gelatine containing semi-solid layers made prior to the experiment. Small wells are cut into the layer and filled with cells and the test substance. Cells can migrate towards the chemical gradient in the semi solid layer or under the layer as well. Some variations of the technique deal also with wells and parallel channels connected by a cut at the start of the experiment (PP-technique). Radial arrangement of PP-technique (3 or more channels) provides the possibility to compare chemotactic activity of different cell populations or study preference between ligands.

Counting of cells: positive responder cells could be counted from the front of migrating cells, after staining or in native conditions in light microscope.

== Two-chamber techniques ==
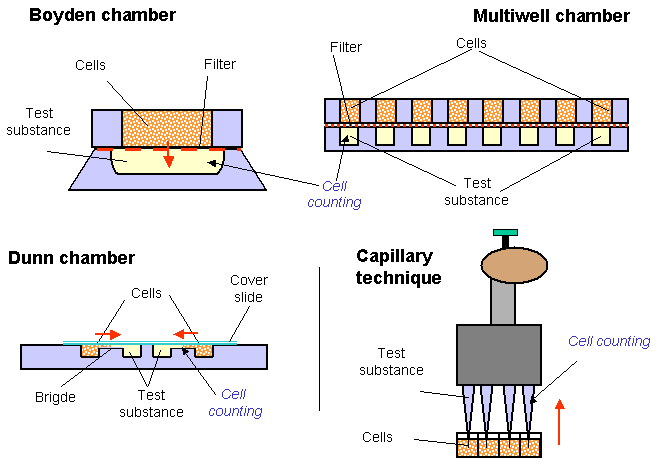
Chemotaxis chamber assays

=== Boyden chamber ===
Chambers isolated by filters are proper tools for accurate determination of chemotactic behavior. The pioneer type of these chambers was constructed by Stephen Boyden. The motile cells are placed into the upper chamber, while fluid containing the test substance is filled into the lower one. The size of the motile cells to be investigated determines the pore size of the filter; it is essential to choose a diameter which allows active transmigration. For modelling in vivo conditions, several protocols prefer coverage of filter with molecules of extracellular matrix (collagen, elastin etc.) Efficiency of the measurements was increased by development of multiwell chambers (e.g. NeuroProbe), where 24, 96, 384 samples are evaluated in parallel. Advantage of this variant is that several parallels are assayed in identical conditions.

=== Bridge chambers ===
In another setting, the chambers are connected side by side horizontally (Zigmond chamber) or as concentric rings on a slide (Dunn chamber) Concentration gradient develops on a narrow connecting bridge between the chambers and the number of migrating cells is also counted on the surface of the bridge by light microscope. In some cases the bridge between the two chambers is filled with agar and cells have to "glide" in this semisolid layer.

=== Capillary techniques ===
Some capillary techniques provide also a chamber like arrangement, however, there is no filter between the cells and the test substance. Quantitative results are gained by the multiwell type of this probe using 4-8-12-channel pipettes. Accuracy of the pipette and increased number of the parallel running samples is the great advantage of this test.

Positive responder cells are counted from the lower chamber (long incubation time) or from the filter (short incubation time). To detect cells, general staining techniques (e.g. trypan blue) or special probes (e.g. mt-dehydrogenase detection with MTT assay) are used. Labelled (e.g. fluorochromes) cells are also used, and in some assays, cells get labelled during transmigration across the filter.

== Other techniques ==
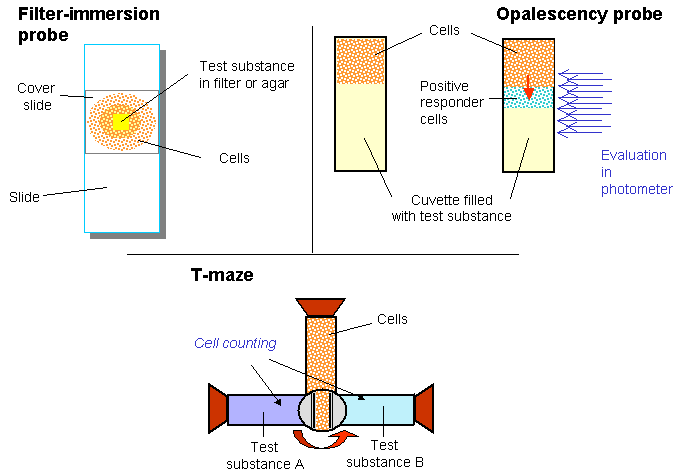
Other chemotaxis assay techniques

Besides the above-mentioned two most commonly used family of techniques, a wide range of protocols were developed to measure chemotactic activity. Some of them are only qualitative, like aggregation tests, where small pieces of agar or filters are placed onto a slide and accumulation of cells around is measured.

In another semiquantitative technique, cells are overlaid the test substance and changes in opalescence of the originally cell-free compartment is recorded during the incubation time.

The third frequently used qualitative technique is the T-maze and its adaptations for microplates. In the original version, a container drilled in a peg is filled with cells. Then the peg is twisted and the cells get contact with two other containers filled with different substances. The incubation is stopped by resetting the peg and the cell number is counted from the containers.

Also, lately, microfluidic devices have been used more and more frequently to test quantitatively, and precisely, for chemotaxis.
