= Leukotriene receptor antagonist-associated Churg–Strauss syndrome =

- Specialty: Dermatology

Leukotriene receptor antagonist-associated Churg–Strauss syndrome may occur in asthma patients being treated with leukotriene receptor antagonists, occurring 2 days to 10 months after the antagonist has been started, with features of the syndrome including peripheral eosinophilia, pulmonary infiltrates, and less commonly neuropathy, sinusitis, and cardiomyopathy.

== See also ==
- Eosinophilic granulomatosis with polyangiitis (previously known as Churg-Strauss syndrome)
- Leukotriene antagonist
- Skin lesion
