= A. Dale Kaiser =

American biologist (1927–2020)

Armin Dale Kaiser (November 10, 1927 – June 5, 2020) was an American biochemist, molecular geneticist, molecular biologist and developmental biologist.

== Biography ==
Kaiser received in 1950 his bachelor's degree from Purdue University and in 1955 his PhD from Caltech in biology. At Caltech he was in Max Delbrück's bacteriophage group and received his PhD in biology under Jean Weigle with thesis A genetic analysis of bacteriophage lambda. Kaiser was in 1956 a postdoc at the Pasteur Institute in Paris (where he worked in Francois Jacob's group) and afterward became an instructor and then in 1958 an assistant professor in microbiology at Washington University in St. Louis. In 1959 he became an assistant professor at Stanford University, where in 1966 he became a professor for biochemistry at Stanford University School of Medicine. From 1989-2020 he was also a professor of developmental biology.

In the beginning of his career, Kaiser concentrated on the molecular genetics of bacteriophage lambda. He was especially concerned with the control mechanisms for lysogeny. He found one of the first examples of self-regulation of a gene (cI, the repressor gene of lambda phage) and later did pioneering work on molecular chaperones. Some of the methods developed by Kaiser's laboratory became important in genetic engineering.

In the 1970s he worked on the developmental biology of swarms of myxobacteria. In the 2000s his laboratory team did research on genetic and biochemical methods to control the swarm and propagation behavior of the bacterial species Myxococcus xanthus. When starved, the Myxococcus bacteria aggregate together to make fruiting bodies, each with approximately $10^5$ spores; the form of the fruiting body is species-specific. Kaiser's laboratory succeeded in the identification and molecular elucidation of the roles of a series of molecular messengers in the swarm and propagation behavior of Myxococcus.

Kaiser received in 1970 the U. S. Steel Foundation Award in Molecular Biology, in 1980 the Albert Lasker Award for Basic Medical Research, in 1981 the Waterford Biomedical Science Award, in 1997 the Abbott Lifetime Achievement Award of the American Society for Microbiology and in 1991 the Thomas Hunt Morgan Medal. In 1970 he was elected a member of the National Academy of Sciences and a member of the American Academy of Arts and Sciences. In 1993 Kaiser was the president of the Genetics Society of America.

Born in Piqua, Ohio, Kaiser died in Stanford, California.

== Selected works ==
- Editor with Martin Dworkin Myxobacteria II, American Society of Microbiology 1993
- Editor with Graham C. Walker Frontiers in Microbiology, American Society of Microbiology 1993
