= Kinesis (biology) =

Activity of an organism in response to a stimuli

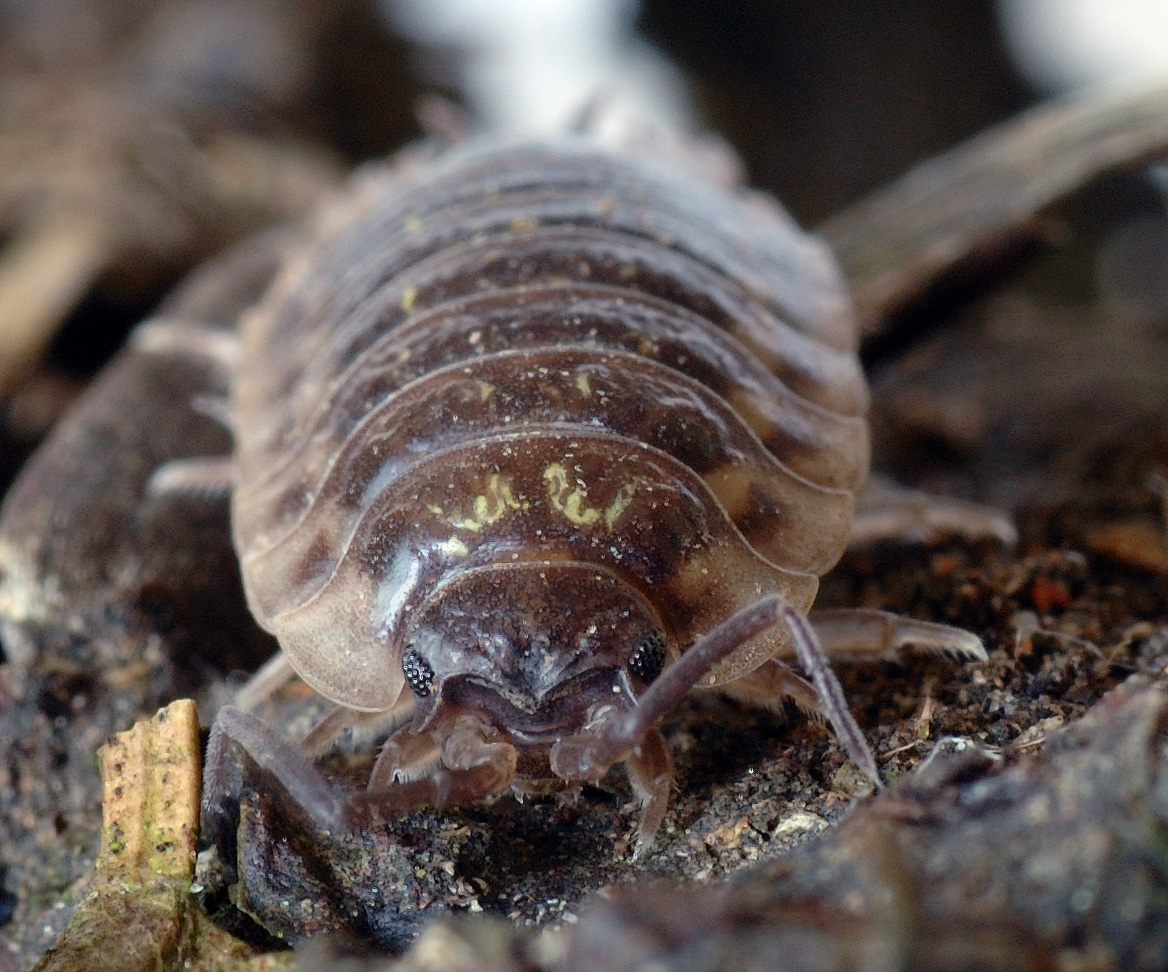
Woodlouse activity decreases as humidity increases.

Kinesis, like a taxis or tropism, is a movement or activity of a cell or an organism in response to a stimulus (such as gas exposure, light intensity or ambient temperature).

Unlike taxis, the response to the stimulus provided is non-directional. The animal does not move toward or away from the stimulus but moves at either a slow or fast rate depending on its "comfort zone." In this case, a fast movement (non-random) means that the animal is searching for its comfort zone while a slow movement indicates that it has found it.

== Types ==
There are two main types of kineses, both resulting in aggregations. However, the stimulus does not act to attract or repel individuals.

Orthokinesis: in which the speed of movement of the individual is dependent upon the stimulus intensity. For example, the locomotion of the collembola, Orchesella cincta, in relation to water. With increased water saturation in the soil there is an increase in the direction of its movement towards the aimed place.

Klinokinesis: in which the frequency or rate of turning is proportional to stimulus intensity. For example, the behaviour of the flatworm (Dendrocoelum lacteum) which turns more frequently in response to increasing light thus ensuring that it spends more time in dark areas.

== Basic model of kinesis ==
The kinesis strategy controlled by the locally and instantly evaluated well-being (fitness) can be described in simple words: Animals stay longer in good conditions and leave bad conditions more quickly. If the well-being is measured by the local reproduction coefficient then the minimal reaction-diffusion model of kinesis can be written as follows:

For each population in the biological community,

$\partial_t u_ i ( x,t) = D_{0i} \nabla \left(e ^{-\alpha_i r_i(u_1,\ldots,u_k,s)} \nabla u_i \right)+r_i (u_1,\ldots,u_k,s) u_i,$

where: $u_i$ is the population density of ith species, $s$ represents the abiotic characteristics of the living conditions (can be multidimensional), $r_i$ is the reproduction coefficient, which depends on all $u_i$ and on s, $D_{0i}>0$ is the equilibrium diffusion coefficient (defined for equilibrium $r_i=0$). The coefficient $\alpha_i>0$ characterises dependence of the diffusion coefficient on the reproduction coefficient.

The models of kinesis were tested with typical situations. It was demonstrated that kinesis is beneficial for assimilation of both patches and fluctuations of food distribution. Kinesis may delay invasion and spreading of species with the Allee effect.

== See also ==
- Brownian motion
- Chemokinesis
- Cranial kinesis
- Cytokinesis
- Diffusion
- Nastic movements
- Photokinesis
- Rapid plant movement
- Taxis
