= Zileuton =

Chemical compound

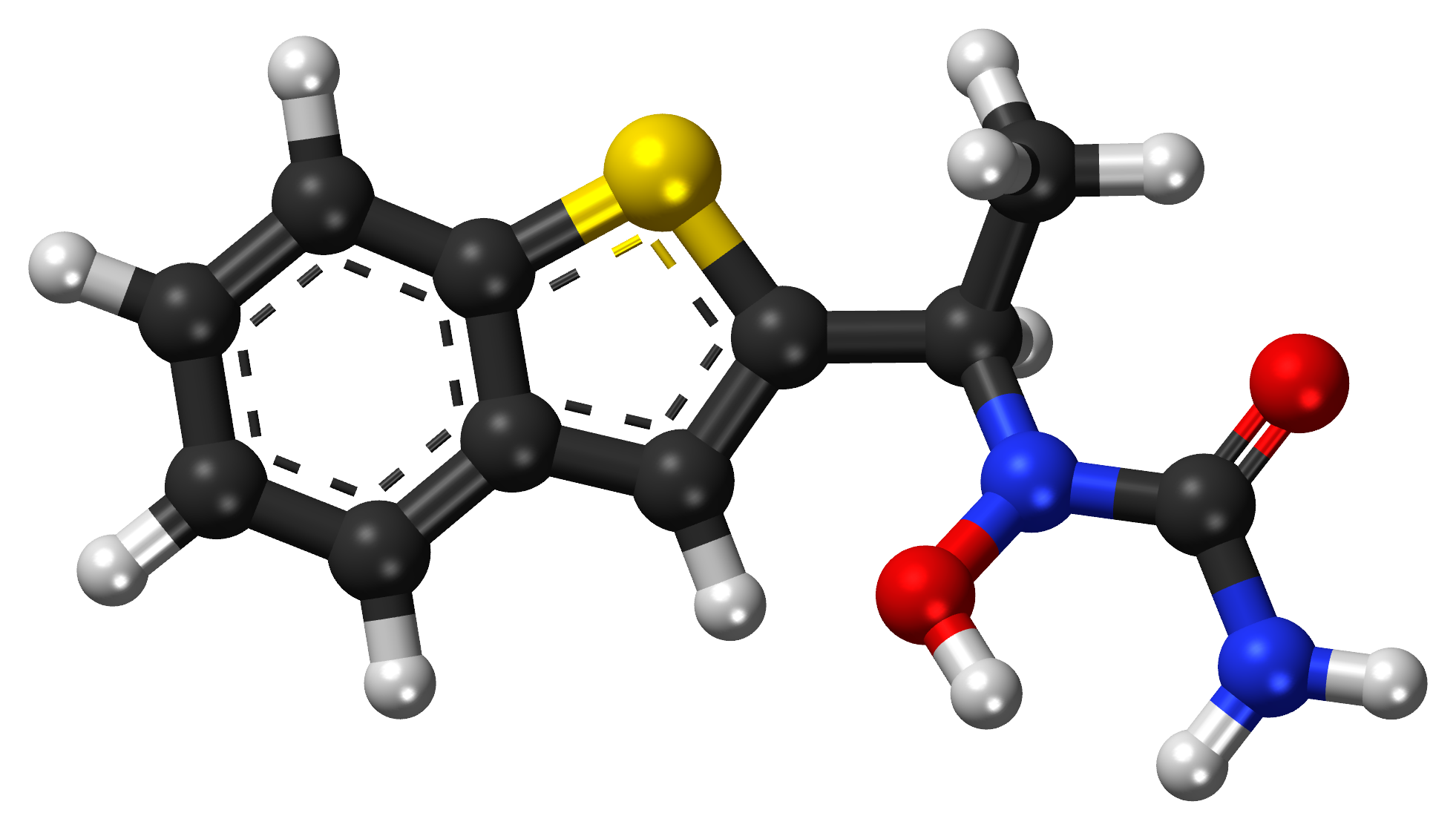

Clinical data
- Pronunciation: /zaɪˈluːtən/ zy-LOO-tən
- Trade names: Zyflo
- AHFS/Drugs.com: Monograph
- MedlinePlus: a697013
- License data: US DailyMed: Zileuton
- Routes of administration: Oral
- ATC code: None

Legal status
- Legal status: US: ℞-only

Pharmacokinetic data
- Bioavailability: Not yet established
- Protein binding: 93%
- Metabolism: Hepatic (CYP1A2, CYP2C9 and CYP3A4-mediated)
- Elimination half-life: 2.5 hours
- Excretion: Renal

Identifiers
- IUPAC name: N-[1-(1-benzothien-2-yl)ethyl]-N-hydroxyurea
- CAS Number: 111406-87-2
- PubChem CID: 60490
- IUPHAR/BPS: 5297
- DrugBank: DB00744
- ChemSpider: 54531
- UNII: V1L22WVE2S
- KEGG: D00414
- ChEBI: CHEBI:10112
- ChEMBL: ChEMBL93
- CompTox Dashboard (EPA): DTXSID9023752
- ECHA InfoCard: 100.121.111

Chemical and physical data
- Formula: C_{11}H_{12}N_{2}O_{2}S
- Molar mass: 236.29 g·mol^{−1}
- 3D model (JSmol): Interactive image
- Chirality: Racemic mixture
- SMILES: O=C(N)N(O)C(c2sc1ccccc1c2)C
- InChI: InChI=1S/C11H12N2O2S/c1-7(13(15)11(12)14)10-6-8-4-2-3-5-9(8)16-10/h2-7,15H,1H3,(H2,12,14); Key:MWLSOWXNZPKENC-UHFFFAOYSA-N

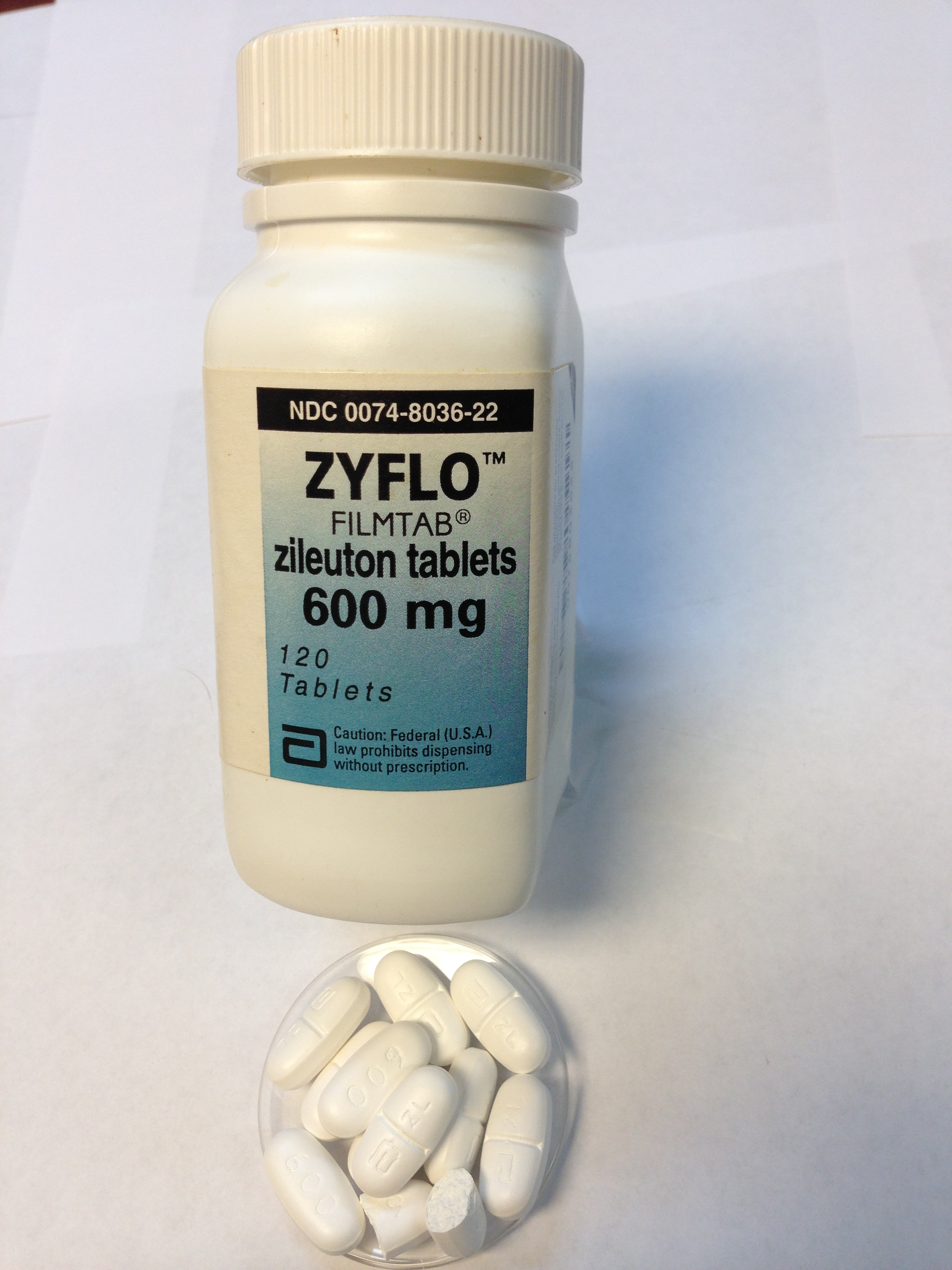
Abbott Laboratories stock bottle of Zyflo (zileuton) 600 mg tablets (manufactured 1997). Also shown are Zyflo tablets, with one tab broken. Tablets are branded with the Abbott "a" logo and "ZL".

Zileuton (trade name Zyflo) is an orally active inhibitor of 5-lipoxygenase, and thus inhibits leukotrienes (LTB_{4}, LTC_{4}, LTD_{4}, and LTE_{4}) formation, used for the maintenance treatment of asthma. Zileuton was introduced in 1996 by Abbott Laboratories and is now marketed in two formulations by Cornerstone Therapeutics Inc. under the brand names Zyflo and Zyflo CR. The original immediate-release formulation, Zyflo, is taken four times per day. The extended-release formulation, Zyflo CR, is taken twice daily.

Although the 600 mg immediate release tablet (Zyflo) and extended release formulation of zileuton are still available (Zyflo CR), the 300 mg immediate release tablet was withdrawn from the U.S. market on 12 February 2008.

== Pharmacotherapy ==
=== Indications and dosing ===
Zileuton is indicated for the prophylaxis and chronic treatment of asthma in adults and children 12 years of age and older. Zileuton is not indicated for use in the reversal of bronchospasm in acute asthma attacks. Therapy with zileuton can be continued during acute exacerbations of asthma.

The recommended dose of Zyflo is one 600 mg tablet, four times per day. The tablets may be split in half to make them easier to swallow. The recommended dose of Zyflo CR is two 600 mg extended-release tablets twice daily, within one hour after morning and evening meals, for a daily dose of 2400 mg. Do not split Zyflo CR tablets in half.

Related compounds include montelukast (Singulair) and zafirlukast (Accolate). These two compounds are leukotriene receptor antagonists which block the action of specific leukotrienes, while zileuton inhibits leukotriene formation.

Research

Research on mice suggests that Zileuton used alone or in combination with imatinib may inhibit chronic myeloid leukemia (CML). It has also been researched in a mouse model of dementia.

=== Contraindications and warnings ===
The most serious side effect of Zyflo and Zyflo CR is a potential elevation of liver enzymes (in 2% of patients). Therefore, zileuton is contraindicated in patients with active liver disease or persistent hepatic function enzymes elevations greater than three times the upper limit of normal. Hepatic function should be assessed prior to initiating Zyflo CR, monthly for the first 3 months, every 2–3 months for the remainder of the first year, and periodically thereafter.

Neuropsychiatric events, including sleep disorders and behavioral changes, may occur with Zyflo and Zyflo CR. Patients should be instructed to notify their healthcare provider if neuropsychiatric events occur while using Zyflo or Zyflo CR.

Zileuton is a weak inhibitor of CYP1A2 and thus has three clinically important drug interactions, which include increasing theophylline, and propranolol levels. It has been shown to lower theophylline clearance significantly, doubling the AUC and prolonging half-life by nearly 25%. Because of theophylline's relation to caffeine (both being a methylxanthine, and theophylline being a metabolite of caffeine), caffeine's metabolism and clearance may also be reduced, but there are no drug interaction studies between zileuton and caffeine. The R-isomer of warfarin metabolism and clearance is mainly affected by zileuton, while the S-isomer is not (because of metabolism via different enzymes). This can lead to an increase in prothrombin time.

== Chemistry ==
Zileuton is an active oral inhibitor of the enzyme 5-lipoxygenase, which forms leukotrienes, 5-hydroxyeicosatetraenoic acid, and 5-oxo-eicosatetraenoic acid from arachidonic acid. The chemical name of zileuton is (±)-1-(1-Benzo[b]thien-2-ylethyl)-l-hydroxyurea.

The molecular formula of zileuton is C_{11}H_{12}N_{2}O_{2}S with a molecular weight of 236.29. The formulation from the manufacturer is a racemic mixture of R(+) and S(-) enantiomers.

== Pharmacokinetics ==
Following oral administration zileuton is rapidly absorbed with a mean time to peak blood serum concentration of 1.7 hours and an average half-life elimination of 2.5 hours. Blood plasma concentrations are proportional to dose, whereas the absolute bioavailability is unknown.

The apparent volume of distribution of zileuton is approximately 1.2 L/kg. Zileuton is 93% bound to plasma proteins, primarily to albumin, with minor binding to alpha-1-acid glycoprotein.

Elimination of zileuton is primarily through metabolites in the urine (~95%) with the feces accounting for the next largest amount (~2%). The drug is metabolized by the cytochrome P450 enzymes: CYP1A2, 2C9, and 3A4.

== Adverse effects ==
The most common adverse reactions reported by patients treated with Zyflo CR were sinusitis (6.5%), nausea (5%), and pharyngolaryngeal pain (5%) vs. placebo, 4%, 1.5%, and 4% respectively.

== Interactions ==
=== Drug interactions ===
Zileuton is a minor substrate of CYP1A2, 2C8/9, 3A4, and a weak inhibitor of CYP 1A2. The drug has been shown to increase the serum concentration or effects of theophylline, propranolol, and warfarin, although significant increase in prothrombin time is not obvious. It is advised that the doses of each medication be monitored and/or reduced accordingly.

=== Other interactions ===
The avoidance of alcohol is recommended due to increased risk of CNS depression as well as an increased risk of liver toxicity. In addition, the herbal supplement St. John's wort may decrease the serum levels of zileuton.

== Overdose/toxicology ==
=== Symptoms ===
Human experience of acute overdose with zileuton is limited. A patient in a clinical study took between 6.6 and 9.0 grams of zileuton immediate-release tablets in a single dose. Vomiting was inducted and the patient recovered without sequelae. Zileuton is not removed by dialysis.

The oral minimum lethal doses in mice and rats were 500–4000 and 300–1000 mg/kg, respectively (providing greater than 3 and 9 times the systemic exposure (AUC) achieved at the maximum recommended human daily oral dose, respectively). In dogs, at an oral dose of 1000 mg/kg (providing in excess of 12 times the systemic exposure (AUC) achieved at the maximum recommended human daily oral dose) no deaths occurred but nephritis was reported.

=== Treatment ===
Should an overdose occur, the patient should be treated symptomatically and supportive measures instituted as required. If indicated, elimination of unabsorbed drug should be achieved by emesis or gastric lavage; usual precautions should be observed to maintain the airway. A Certified Poison Control Center should be consulted for up-to-date information on management of overdose with Zyflo CR.

== See also ==
- Lipoxygenase inhibitor
