= 5-lipoxygenase-activating protein =

Protein-coding gene in the species Homo sapiens

ALOX5AP
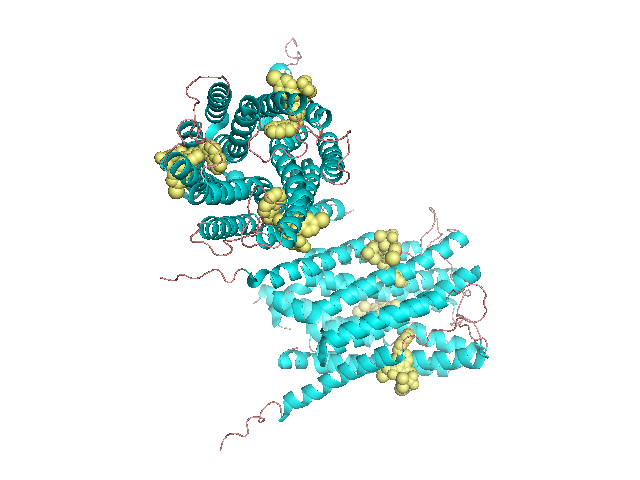
Available structures
PDB	Ortholog search: PDBe RCSB
PDB	List of PDB id codes 2Q7R, 2Q7M

Identifiers
- Aliases: ALOX5AP, FLAP, arachidonate 5-lipoxygenase activating protein
- External IDs: OMIM: 603700; MGI: 107505; HomoloGene: 1231; GeneCards: ALOX5AP; OMA:ALOX5AP - orthologs

Gene location (Mouse)
Chr.	Chromosome 5 (mouse)
Band	5|5 G3	Start	149,201,577 bp
Band	5|5 G3	End	149,224,963 bp
RNA expression pattern
Bgee	Human / Mouse (ortholog); Top expressed in: blood; trabecular bone; bone marrow; right lung; bone marrow cell; monocyte; upper lobe of left lung; spleen; lower lobe of lung; periodontal fiber / Top expressed in: granulocyte; stroma of bone marrow; tibiofemoral joint; blood; right lung lobe; ankle; interventricular septum; carotid body; spleen; sciatic nerve; More reference expression data
BioGPS	More reference expression data
Gene ontology
Molecular function	glutathione transferase activity; protein N-terminus binding; leukotriene-C4 synthase activity; glutathione peroxidase activity; protein binding; arachidonic acid binding; enzyme activator activity
Cellular component	integral component of membrane; nuclear membrane; endoplasmic reticulum membrane; membrane; nuclear envelope; endoplasmic reticulum; nucleus
Biological process	cellular response to calcium ion; leukotriene metabolic process; positive regulation of catalytic activity; protein homotrimerization; lipoxygenase pathway; leukotriene biosynthetic process; lipoxin metabolic process; cellular oxidant detoxification; lipoxin biosynthetic process
Sources:Amigo / QuickGO
Orthologs
Species	Human	Mouse
Entrez	241	11690
Ensembl	n/a	ENSMUSG00000060063
UniProt	P20292	P30355
RefSeq (mRNA)	NM_001204406; NM_001629	NM_009663; NM_001308462
RefSeq (protein)	NP_001191335; NP_001620	NP_001295391; NP_033793
Location (UCSC)	n/a	Chr 5: 149.2 – 149.22 Mb
PubMed search
- Wikidata
View/Edit Human	View/Edit Mouse

Arachidonate 5-lipoxygenase-activating protein also known as 5-lipoxygenase activating protein, or FLAP, is a protein that in humans is encoded by the ALOX5AP gene.

== Function ==
FLAP is necessary for the activation of 5-lipoxygenase and therefore for the production of leukotrienes, 5-hydroxyeicosatetraenoic acid, 5-oxo-eicosatetraenoic acid, and specialized pro-resolving mediators of the lipoxin and resolvin classes. It is an integral protein within the nuclear membrane. FLAP is necessary in synthesis of leukotriene, which are lipid mediators of inflammation that is involved in respiratory and cardiovascular diseases. FLAP functions as a membrane anchor for 5-lipooxygenase and as an amine acid-bind protein. How FLAP activates 5-lipooxygenase is not completely understood, but there is a physical interaction between the two. FLAP structure consists of 4 transmembrane alpha helices, but they are found in trimer forming a barrel. The barrel is about 60 Å high and 36 Å wide.

== Clinical significance ==
Leukotrienes, which require the FLAP protein to be synthesized, have an established pathological role in allergic and respiratory diseases. Animal and human genetic evidence suggests they may also have an important role in atherosclerosis, myocardial infarction, and stroke. The structure of FLAP provides a tool for the development of novel therapies for respiratory and cardiovascular diseases and for the design of focused experiments to probe the cell biology of FLAP and its role in leukotriene biosynthesis.

== Inhibitors ==
- AM-679
- MK-886
- Veliflapon (BAY X1005)
