= Montelukast =

Medication used in asthma or COPD

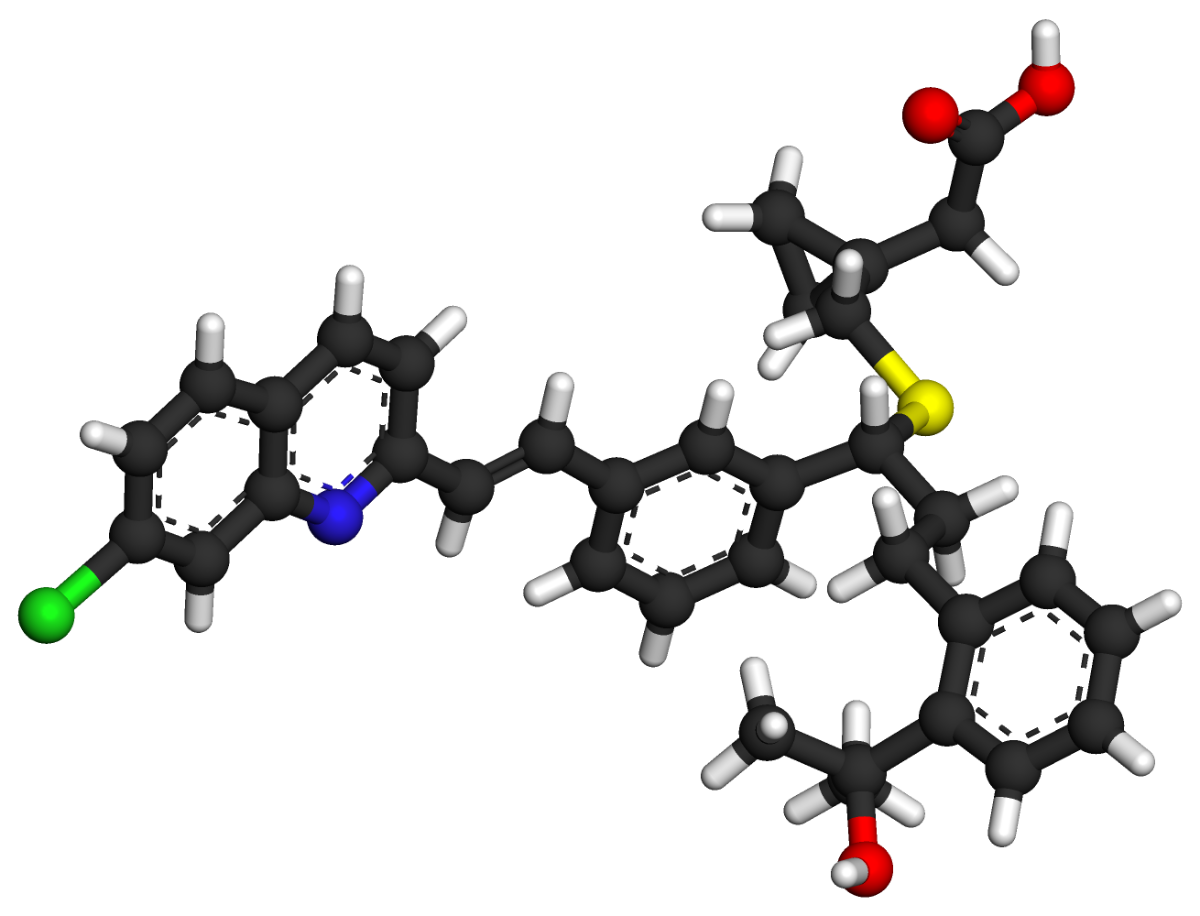

Clinical data
- Pronunciation: mon te loo' kast
- Trade names: Singulair, others
- AHFS/Drugs.com: Monograph
- MedlinePlus: a600014
- License data: US DailyMed: Montelukast
- Pregnancy category: AU: B1
- Routes of administration: By mouth
- Drug class: Leukotriene receptor antagonist
- ATC code: R03DC03 (WHO)

Legal status
- Legal status: AU: S4 (Prescription only); CA: ℞-only; UK: POM (Prescription only); US: ℞-only

Pharmacokinetic data
- Bioavailability: 63–73%
- Protein binding: 99%
- Metabolism: Liver (CYP2C8-major, CYP3A4 and CYP2C9-minor)
- Elimination half-life: 2.7–5.5 hours
- Excretion: Bile duct

Identifiers
- IUPAC name: (E,Z)-2-(1-((1-(3-(2-(7-Chloroquinolin-2-yl)vinyl)phenyl)-3-(2-(2-hydroxypropan-2-yl)phenyl)propylthio)methyl)cyclopropyl)acetic acid
- CAS Number: 158966-92-8
- PubChem CID: 5281040
- IUPHAR/BPS: 3340
- DrugBank: DB00471
- ChemSpider: 4444507
- UNII: MHM278SD3E
- KEGG: D08229; as salt: D00529
- ChEBI: CHEBI:50730
- ChEMBL: ChEMBL787
- CompTox Dashboard (EPA): DTXSID9023334
- ECHA InfoCard: 100.115.927

Chemical and physical data
- Formula: C_{35}H_{36}ClNO_{3}S
- Molar mass: 586.19 g·mol^{−1}
- 3D model (JSmol): Interactive image
- Melting point: 145 to 148 °C (293 to 298 °F)
- SMILES: O=C(O)CC1(CC1)CS[C@@H](c2cccc(c2)\C=C\c3nc4cc(Cl)ccc4cc3)CCc5ccccc5C(O)(C)C
- InChI: InChI=1S/C35H36ClNO3S/c1-34(2,40)30-9-4-3-7-25(30)13-17-32(41-23-35(18-19-35)22-33(38)39)27-8-5-6-24(20-27)10-15-29-16-12-26-11-14-28(36)21-31(26)37-29/h3-12,14-16,20-21,32,40H,13,17-19,22-23H2,1-2H3,(H,38,39)/b15-10+/t32-/m1/s1; Key:UCHDWCPVSPXUMX-TZIWLTJVSA-N

Montelukast, sold under the brand name Singulair among others, is a medication used in the maintenance treatment of asthma. It is generally less preferred for this use than inhaled corticosteroids. It is not useful for acute asthma attacks. Other uses include allergic rhinitis and hives of long duration. For allergic rhinitis it is a second-line treatment.

Common side effects include abdominal pain, cough, and headache. Severe side effects may include allergic reactions, such as anaphylaxis and eosinophilia. Use in pregnancy appears to be safe. In 2019, concerns over neuropsychiatric side effects resulted in montelukast receiving a black box warning in the United Kingdom for behavioural changes, depression, and suicidality. Montelukast is in the leukotriene receptor antagonist family of medications. It works by blocking the action of leukotriene D4 in the lungs resulting in decreased inflammation and relaxation of smooth muscle.

Montelukast was approved for medical use in the United States in 1998. It is available as a generic medication. In 2024, it was the 21st most commonly prescribed medication in the United States, with more than 25 million prescriptions.

== Medical uses ==
Montelukast is used for a number of conditions including asthma, exercise induced bronchospasm, allergic rhinitis, and urticaria. It is mainly used as a complementary therapy in adults in addition to inhaled corticosteroids, if inhaled steroids alone do not bring the desired effect. It is also used to prevent allergic reactions and asthma flare-ups during the administration of intravenous immunoglobulin. It may also be used as an adjunct therapy in symptomatic treatment of mastocytosis. It is taken by mouth, as a tablet, chewable tablet, or as granules.

== Pharmacology ==
Montelukast is in the leukotriene receptor antagonist family of medications. It works by blocking the action of leukotriene D4 in the lungs resulting in decreased inflammation and relaxation of smooth muscle.

Montelukast functions as a leukotriene receptor antagonist (cysteinyl leukotriene receptors) and consequently opposes the function of these inflammatory mediators; leukotrienes are produced by the immune system and serve to promote bronchoconstriction, inflammation, microvascular permeability, and mucus secretion in asthma and COPD.

== Adverse effects ==
Common side effects include diarrhea, nausea, vomiting, mild rashes, asymptomatic elevations in liver enzymes, and fever. Uncommon side effects include fatigue and malaise, behavioral changes, paresthesias and seizures, muscle cramps, and nose bleeds. Rare (may affect up to 1 in 10,000 people taking montelukast) but serious side effects include behavioral changes (including suicidal thoughts), angioedema, erythema multiforme, and liver problems.

In 2019 and 2020, concerns for neuropsychiatric reactions were added to the prescription labels in the United Kingdom and the United States where the most frequently suspected were nightmares, depression, insomnia (may affect between 1 in 100 to 1 in 1,000 people taking montelukast); aggression, anxiety and abnormal behavior or changes in behavior (may affect between 1 in 1,000 and 1 in 10,000 people taking montelukast).

=== FDA investigation ===
In June 2009, the US Food and Drug Administration (FDA) concluded a review into the possibility of neuropsychiatric side effects with leukotriene modulator drugs. Although clinical trials revealed only an increased risk of insomnia, post-marketing surveillance showed that the drugs were associated with a possible increase in suicidal behavior and other side effects such as agitation, aggression, anxiousness, dream abnormalities, hallucinations, depression, irritability, restlessness, and tremor.

In March 2020, the FDA required a boxed warning for montelukast to strengthen an existing warning about the risk of neuropsychiatric events associated with the drug in the wake of an increase in case reporting of neuropsychiatric events around the time of the initial communications about the concern from FDA in 2008. The boxed warning advises health care providers to avoid prescribing montelukast to patients with mild symptoms, particularly those with allergic rhinitis, because there are many other allergy medicines that can safely and effectively manage this condition.

In the FDA's data analysis, in comparison to case reports that based on people's self-reports, the propensity of developing neuropsychiatric disorders after montelukast use did not outpace that of inhaled corticosteroids; and there were no statistically significant risks of new-onset neuropsychiatric disorders among males, females, patients 12 years and older, patients with a psychiatric history, or after the 2008 FDA communication and prescribing information changes that first publicized the concern. In addition, the FDA's analysis summary of its findings said "exposure to montelukast was significantly associated with a decreased risk of treated outpatient depressive disorder and the decreased risks were seen among patients with a history of a psychiatric disorder, in patients 12 to 17 years as well as 18 years and older, and in both females and males." "Treated outpatient depressive disorder" refers to patients who sought treatment specifically for depressive disorders in outpatient psychiatric settings.

In 2024, following reports of night terrors, uncontrollable aggression, intrusive thoughts, depression and rare cases of hallucinations and suicidal behavior in children, the UK Medicines and Healthcare products Regulatory Agency (MHRA) was reviewing the risks of montelukast after identifying "further concerns". The FDA has begun, as of 2020, an internal expert review of why the drug may cause "neuropsychiatric side effects".

In a limited audience review of some findings of this internal group to the American College of Toxicology, on 20 November 2024 in Austin, Texas, Jessica Oliphant, deputy director for FDA's National Center for Toxicological Research, said "that laboratory tests showed “significant binding” of montelukast to multiple receptors found in the brain" and that "These data indicate that montelukast is highest in brain regions known to be involved in (psychiatric effects)." The FDA does not plan to update the box warning label.

== Drug interactions ==
Montelukast is an inhibitor of the drug metabolizing enzyme CYP2C8, part of the cytochrome P450 system. Therefore, it is theoretically possible that the combination of montelukast with a CYP2C8 substrate (e.g. amodiaquine, an anti-malarial drug) could increase the plasma concentrations of the substrate. However, clinical studies have shown minimal interactions between montelukast and other CYP2C8 substrate drugs, which is most likely due to the high plasma protein binding exhibited by montelukast.

== Society and culture ==
=== Patents ===
Singulair was covered by US Patent No. 5,565,473 which expired on 3 August 2012. The same day, the FDA approved several generic versions of montelukast.

The United States Patent and Trademark Office launched a reexamination of the patent covering Singulair in May 2009. The decision was driven by the discovery of references that were not included in the original patent application process. The references were submitted through Article One Partners, an online research community focused on finding literature relating to existing patents. The references included a scientific article produced by a Merck employee on the active ingredient in Singulair. A previously filed patent had been submitted in the same technology area. Seven months later the US Patent and Trademark Office determined that the patent in question was valid based on the initial reexamination and new information provided, submitting their decision on 17 December 2009.

=== Use with loratadine ===
Schering-Plough and Merck sought permission to market a combined tablet with loratadine and montelukast. However, the FDA has found no benefit from a combined pill for seasonal allergies over taking the two drugs in combination, and in April 2008, issued a not-approvable letter for the combination.

=== Brand names ===
The Mont in montelukast stands for Montreal, where Merck (MSD) developed the drug.

Montelukast is sold under a variety of brand names including Monalast (Ziska Pharmaceuticals Ltd) Montenaaf (NAAFCO Pharma) Montelon-10 (Apex), Montene (Square), Montair-10, Lukotas, Montelo-10, Monteflo, and Tukast L in India, Reversair (ACI Bangladesh), Monas, Miralust, Montiva, Provair, Montril, Lumona, Lumenta, Arokast and Trilock in Bangladesh, Ventair in Nepal, Montika in Pakistan, Montelair in Brazil, Zykast in the Philippines though combined with levocetirizine, Desmont, Levmont, Aircomb and Notta in Turkey, Topraz and Monte-Air in South Africa.
