= Chemokinesis =

Chemically prompted movement of single-celled organisms

Chemokinesis is chemically prompted kinesis, a motile response of unicellular prokaryotic or eukaryotic organisms to chemicals that cause the cell to make some kind of change in their migratory/swimming behaviour. Changes involve an increase or decrease of speed, alterations of amplitude or frequency of motile character, or direction of migration. However, in contrast to chemotaxis, chemokinesis has a random, non-vectorial moiety, in general.
Due to the random character, techniques dedicated to evaluate chemokinesis are partly different from methods used in chemotaxis research. One of the most valuable ways to measure chemokinesis is computer-assisted (see, e.g., Image J) checker-board analysis, which provides data about migration of identical cells, whereas, in Protozoa (e.g., Tetrahymena), techniques based on measurement of opalescence were also developed.

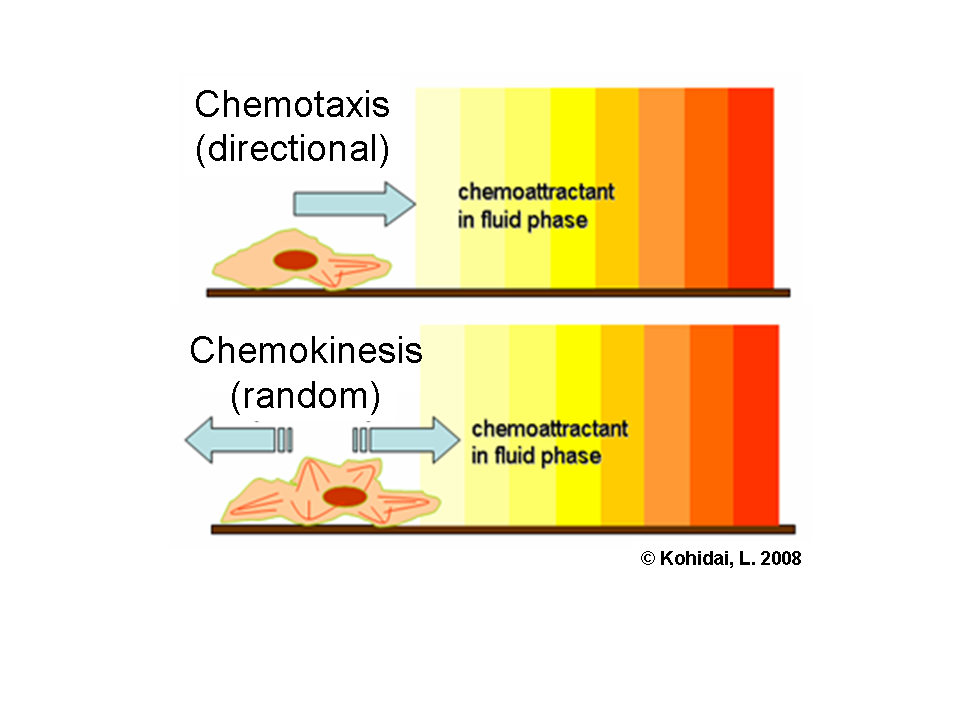
Chemokinesis
