= Leukotriene receptor =

Protein family

The leukotriene (LT) receptors are G protein-coupled receptors that bind and are activated by the leukotrienes. They include the following proteins:

- Leukotriene B4 receptors (BLTRs) – bind to and are activated by LTB4:
  - BLT_{1} (Leukotriene B_{4} receptor 1) – LTB4R
  - BLT_{2} (Leukotriene B_{4} receptor 2) – LTB4R2
- Cysteinyl leukotriene receptors (CysLTRs) – bind to and are activated by LTC4, LTD4, and LTE4:
  - CysLT_{1} (Cysteinyl leukotriene receptor 1) – CYSLTR1
  - CysLT_{2} (Cysteinyl leukotriene receptor 2) – CYSLTR2

The recently elucidated CysLT_{E}, represented by GPR99/OXGR1, may constitute a third CysLTR.

== See also ==
- Eicosanoid receptor
- Oxoeicosanoid receptor
- Prostaglandin receptor
- Thromboxane receptor
