= Cysteinyl leukotriene receptor =

Receptor

The cysteinyl leukotriene receptors (CysLTRs) include the following two receptors:

- Cysteinyl leukotriene receptor 1 (CysLTR1)
- Cysteinyl leukotriene receptor 2 (CysLTR2)

The recently elucidated CysLT_{E}, represented by GPR99/OXGR1, may constitute a third CysLTR.

== See also ==
- Leukotriene receptor
- Eicosanoid receptor
