= Candidatus Magnetoglobus multicellularis =

Scientific classification (Candidatus)
- Domain: Bacteria
- Kingdom: Pseudomonadati
- Phylum: Thermodesulfobacteriota
- Class: Desulfobacteria
- Order: Desulfobacterales
- Family: Desulfobacteraceae
- Genus: Candidatus Magnetoglobus
- Species: Ca. M. multicellularis

Binomial name
- Candidatus Magnetoglobus multicellularis Abreu et al., 2007

Species of multicellular bacteria

Electron Microscope image of "Candidatus Magnetoglobus multicellularis".

"Candidatus Magnetoglobus multicellularis" is a species of multicellular magnetotactic bacteria (MMB). Samples of "Ca. M. multicellularis" were first collected at the Araruama Lagoon in Rio de Janeiro, Brazil. It has a multicellular structure and consists of an organised sphere of flagellated, gram-negative bacterial cells. As it has not yet been cultured under laboratory conditions, it retains the title Candidatus.

== Characteristics ==
=== Morphology ===
"Candidatus Magnetoglobus multicellularis" is an obligately multicellular bacteria without a unicellular stage in its lifecycle. It typically consists of 10–40 bacterial cells in an organised spherical structure surrounding an acellular compartment. The entire organism has a diameter of approximately 3 to 12 micrometres.

Individual cells are elongated into a pyramidal shape, with the narrow apex facing the acellular compartment in the centre. The outward-facing surface of each cell houses numerous flagella. The cells are all tightly joined by highly specialised intercellular junctions, similar to those found in eukaryotic multicellular organisms. The exterior of the organism features a cellulose matrix that plays a role in cell adhesion and structural integrity.

=== Genetic heterogeneity ===
Historically, "Ca. M. multicellularis" was thought to be entirely clonal due to its synchronous cell division. However, single-consortium metagenome (SCM) sequencing has revealed that the individual cells within each organism are genetically heterogeneous. The constituent cells feature distinct single-nucleotide polymorphisms (SNPs) situated randomly across their genomes.

=== Metabolic pathways ===
Genomic analysis indicates that "Ca. M. multicellularis" has the potential to use both autotrophic and heterotrophic pathways. For autotrophic growth, it utilises the Wood–Ljungdahl pathway (also known as the reductive acetyl-coenzyme A pathway) for carbon fixation. For heterotrophy, it is able to use small organic molecules including acetate, propionate, and succinate as carbon donors and/or electron sources. "Ca. M. multicellularis" has also been found to contain a complete glycolysis pathway, a full TCA cycle and group-1 nickel-iron hydrogenases coupled to oxidative phosphorylation.

As found in SCM sequencing, the consortium exhibits both genetic and metabolic differentiation. The use of nano-scale secondary ion mass spectrometry (NanoSIMS) and bioorthogonal noncanonical amino acid tagging (BONCAT) demonstrated that anabolic activity and protein synthesis is not uniform across the organism. The most active regions of protein synthesis were found to be concentrated around the acellular centre. A 2024 study suggests the potential for an internal division of labour, with certain cells metabolising specific substrates and transferring them to surrounding cells by membrane vesicles.

== Life cycle and reproduction ==
"Ca. M. multicellularis" has a completely multicellular life cycle, with no known unicellular stage. The organism grows as an organised spherical consortium by increasing the size of its heterogeneous constituent cells until it has doubled in volume. Following this, the cells undergo synchronous binary fission while remaining associated with one another around the central acellular compartment, to preserve structure and function. The consortium then stretches from a spherical to elongated shape before separating into two approximately equal daughter consortia.

Individual cells removed from the consortium rapidly lost viability, suggesting that its multicellular organisation is essential to its life cycle. When cells die within the consortium they do not detach from their living neighbours due to strong adhesion proteins. Magnetosomes of dead cells remain magnetic, so they can continue to contribute passively to the magnetic orientation of the consortium.

== Movement ==
=== Mobility ===
When "Ca. M. multicellularis" is free-swimming, it travels along elongated helical or straight pathways. The consortium has a co-ordinated flagellar rotation, where the organism's body rotates about its axis at the same time and in the same direction as its trajectory. This appears to prevent the formation of a single flagellar bundle while swimming.

Under free-swimming conditions, the organism displays spontaneous and temporary shifts back-and-forth along magnetic field lines, known as "ping pong movement" or "escape motility". These rapid directional changes, of nearly 180°, have been interpreted as consistent with a synchronised reversal of flagellar rotation. This movement allows the organism to move more freely under the constraints of a magnetic field.

=== Magnetotaxis ===
The movement and orientation of "Ca. M. multicellularis" appears to be altered by many external stimuli as it undergoes magnetotaxis, photokinesis, negative phototaxis and potentially helical klinotaxis.

The organism contains multiple internal magnetosomes, membrane-bound structures containing magnetic nanocrystals. In "Ca. M. multicellularis" these crystals are greigite (Fe_{3}S_{4}) but in most other species of multicellular magnetotactic bacteria (MMB) the crystals are magnetite (Fe_{3}O_{4}). These magnetosomes are organised in linear chains that allow the consortium to orient itself along the Earth's geomagnetic field. In samples from the Southern Hemisphere, "Ca. M. multicellularis" exhibits a preference for south-facing orientation while swimming.

In weak magnetic fields, under 80 μT, "Ca. M. multicellularis" behaves differently to other magnetotactic bacteria. Under fields close to or weaker than Earth's geomagnetic field, its trajectories appear significantly scattered away from the exact magnetic field line. In these situations, movement relies mostly on a combination of other environmental factors and the direction of the magnetic field line does not fully control the final swimming direction.

=== Phototaxis and UV response ===
As well as aligning with magnetic fields, "Ca. M. multicellularis" demonstrates clear photophobic and phototactic behaviours.

When the organism is subjected to short pulses of ultraviolet (UV) light from a fluorescence microscope, it stops moving forward and immediately begins to swim backwards. This escape movement lasts for several seconds before it returns to its normal trajectory.

== See also ==
- Evolution of multicellularity
- Biomineralisation
- Halophile
