= Magnetofossil =

Fossils produced by magnetotactic bacteria

Magnetofossils are the fossil remains of magnetic particles produced by magnetotactic bacteria (magnetobacteria) and preserved in the geologic record. The oldest definitive magnetofossils formed of the mineral magnetite come from the Cretaceous chalk beds of southern England, while magnetofossil reports, not considered to be robust, extend on Earth to the 1.9-billion-year-old Gunflint Chert; they may include the four-billion-year-old Martian meteorite ALH84001.

Magnetotactic organisms are prokaryotic, with only one example of giant magnetofossils, likely produced by eukaryotic organisms, having been reported. Magnetotactic bacteria, the source of the magnetofossils, are magnetite (Fe_{3}O_{4}) or greigite (Fe_{3}S_{4}) producing bacteria found in both freshwater and marine environments. These magnetite bearing magnetotatic bacteria are found in the oxic-anoxic transition zone where conditions are such that oxygen levels are less than those found in the atmosphere (microaerophilic). Compared to the magnetite producing magnetotactic bacteria and subsequent magnetofossils, little is known about the environments in which greigite magnetofossils are created and the magnetic properties of the preserved greigite particles.

Existence of magnetotactic bacteria was first suggested in the 1960s, when Salvatore Bellini of the University of Pavia discovered bacteria in a bog that appeared to align themselves with the magnetic field lines of the Earth. Following this discovery researchers began to think of the effect of magnetotactic bacteria on the fossil record and magnetization of sedimentary layers.

Most of the research concentrated on marine environments, although it has been suggested that these magnetofossils can be found in terrestrial sediments (derived from terrestrial sources). These magnetofossils can be found throughout the sedimentary record, and therefore are influenced by deposition rate. Episodes of high sedimentation, not correlating with an increase in magnetobacterial and thus magnetofossil production, can decrease magnetofossil concentrations vastly, although this is not always the case. An increase in sedimentation normally coincides with an increase of land erosion, and therefore an increase in iron abundance and nutrient supply.

== Magnetization ==
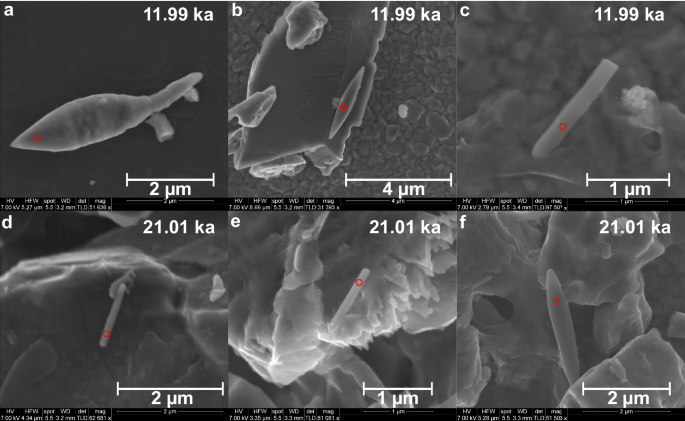
Scanning electron microscope images of different types of giant magnetofossils from late Quaternary sediments from the Bay of Bengal

Within the magnetotactic bacteria, magnetite and greigite crystals are biosynthesized (biomineralized) within organelles called magnetosomes. These magnetosomes form chains within the bacterial cell and in doing so, provide the organism with a permanent magnetic dipole. The organism uses it for geomagnetic navigation, to align itself with the Earth's geomagnetic field (magnetotaxis) and to reach the optimal position along vertical chemical gradients.

When an organism dies the magnetosomes become trapped in sediments. Under the right conditions, primarily if the redox conditions are correct, the magnetite can then be fossilized and therefore stored in the sedimentary record. The fossilization of the magnetite (magnetofossils) within sediments contributes largely to the natural remanent magnetization of the sediment layers. The natural remanent magnetization is the permanent magnetism remaining in a rock or sediment after it has formed.

== Paleoindicators ==
Magnetotactic bacteria use iron to create magnetite in magnetosomes. As a result of this process, increased iron levels correlate with increased production of magnetotactic bacteria. Increases in iron levels have been long associated with hyperthermal (period of warming, usually between 4-8 degrees Celsius) periods in the Earth's history. These hyperthermal events, such as the Palaeocene-Eocene Thermal Maximum or the Holocene Warm Period (HWP), stimulated increased productivity in planktonic and benthic foraminifera, which in turn, resulted in higher levels of sedimentation. Furthermore, an increase in temperature (like the one in the HWP) may also be associated with a wet period. These warm and wet conditions were favourable for magnetofossil production due to an increased nutrient supply in a period of post-glacial warming during the HWP. As a result, this period shows an increase in magnetofossil concentration. Using this increase in concentration, researchers can use magnetofossils as an indicator of a period of relatively high (or low) temperatures in Earth's history. Dating of these rocks can provide information about the time period of this climate change and can be correlated to other rock formations or depositional environments in which the Earth's climate at that time may not have been as clear. Sediment aging and dissolution or alteration of magnetite present problems with providing useful measurements as the crystals structural integrity may not be preserved.

Magnetofossils are not only being studied for their paleoenvironmental or paleoclimatic indicators. As mentioned above, magnetofossils hold a remanent magnetization when they are formed. That is, the magnetite (or greigite) aligns in the direction of the geomagnetic field. The magnetite crystals can be thought of as being a simple magnet with a north and south pole, this north–south orientation aligns with the north–south magnetic poles of the Earth. These fossils are then buried within the rock record. Researchers can examine these rock samples in a remanent magnetometer where the effects of Earth's current magnetic field is removed, to determine the remanent, or initial, magnetization of the rock sample when it was formed. In knowing the orientation of the rock in-situ and the remanent magnetization, researchers can determine the Earth's geomagnetic field at the time the rock was formed. This can be used as an indicator of magnetic field direction, or reversals in the Earth's magnetic field, where the Earth's north and south magnetic poles switch (which happen on average every 450,000 years).

== Research ==
There are many methods for detecting and measuring magnetofossils, although there are some issues with the identification. Current research is suggesting that the trace elements found in the magnetite crystals formed in magnetotactic bacteria differ from crystals formed by other methods. It has also been suggested that calcium and strontium incorporation can be used to identify magnetite inferred from magnetotactic bacteria. Other methods such as transmission electron microscopy (TEM) of samples from deep boreholes and ferromagnetic resonance (FMR) spectroscopy are being used. FMR spectroscopy of chains of cultured magnetotactic bacteria compared to sediment samples are being used to infer magnetofossil preservation over geological time frames. Research suggests that magnetofossils retain their remanent magnetization at deeper burial depths, although this is not entirely confirmed. FMR measurements of saturation isothermal remanent magnetization (SIRM) in some samples, compared with FMR and rainfall measurements taken over the past 70 years, have shown that magnetofossils can retain a record of paleorainfall variations on a shorter time-scale (hundreds of years), making a very useful recent history paleoclimate indicator.

== Summary ==
The process of magnetite and greigite formation from magnetotactic bacteria and the formation of magnetofossils are well understood, although the more specific relationships, like those between the morphology of these fossils and the effect on the climate, nutrient availability and environmental availability would require more research. This however, does not alter the promise of better insight into the Earth's microbial ecology and geomagnetic variations over a large time scale presented by magnetofossils. Unlike some other methods used to provide information of the Earth's history, magnetofossils normally have to be seen in large abundances to provide useful information of Earth's ancient history. Although lower concentrations can tell their own story of the more recent paleoclimate, paleoenvironmental and paleoecological history of the Earth.
