= Iron(II,III) sulfide =

Names
- Other names Ferrous-ferric sulfide, greigite

Identifiers
CAS Number	12063-39-7
3D model (JSmol)	Interactive image
ChEBI	CHEBI:86238
ChemSpider	34999896
PubChem CID	72720442
CompTox Dashboard (EPA)	DTXSID20923500
- InChI: InChI=1S/3Fe.4S/q+2;2*+3;4*-2 Key: UHUWQCGPGPPDDT-UHFFFAOYSA-N
- SMILES: [S-2].[S-2].[S-2].[S-2].[Fe+2].[Fe+3].[Fe+3]

Properties
Chemical formula	FeS·Fe_{2}S_{3}
Molar mass	295.805
Appearance	Bluish-black, pinkish
Density	4.049 g/cm^{3}
- Except where otherwise noted, data are given for materials in their standard state (at 25 °C [77 °F], 100 kPa). verify (what is ?) Infobox references

Iron(II,III) sulfide is a blue-black (sometimes pinkish) chemical compound of iron and sulfur with formula Fe_{3}S_{4} or FeS·Fe_{2}S_{3}, which is much similar to iron(II,III) oxide. It occurs naturally as the sulfide mineral greigite and is magnetic. It is a bio-mineral produced by and found in magnetotactic bacteria. It is a mixed valence compound, featuring both Fe^{2+} and Fe^{3+} centers, in 1:2 ratio.

== Crystal structure ==
The crystallographic unit cell is cubic, with space group Fd3m. The S anions form a cubic close-packed lattice, and the Fe cations occupy both tetrahedral and octahedral sites.

Crystal structure of iron(II,III) sulfide projected along the [110] direction
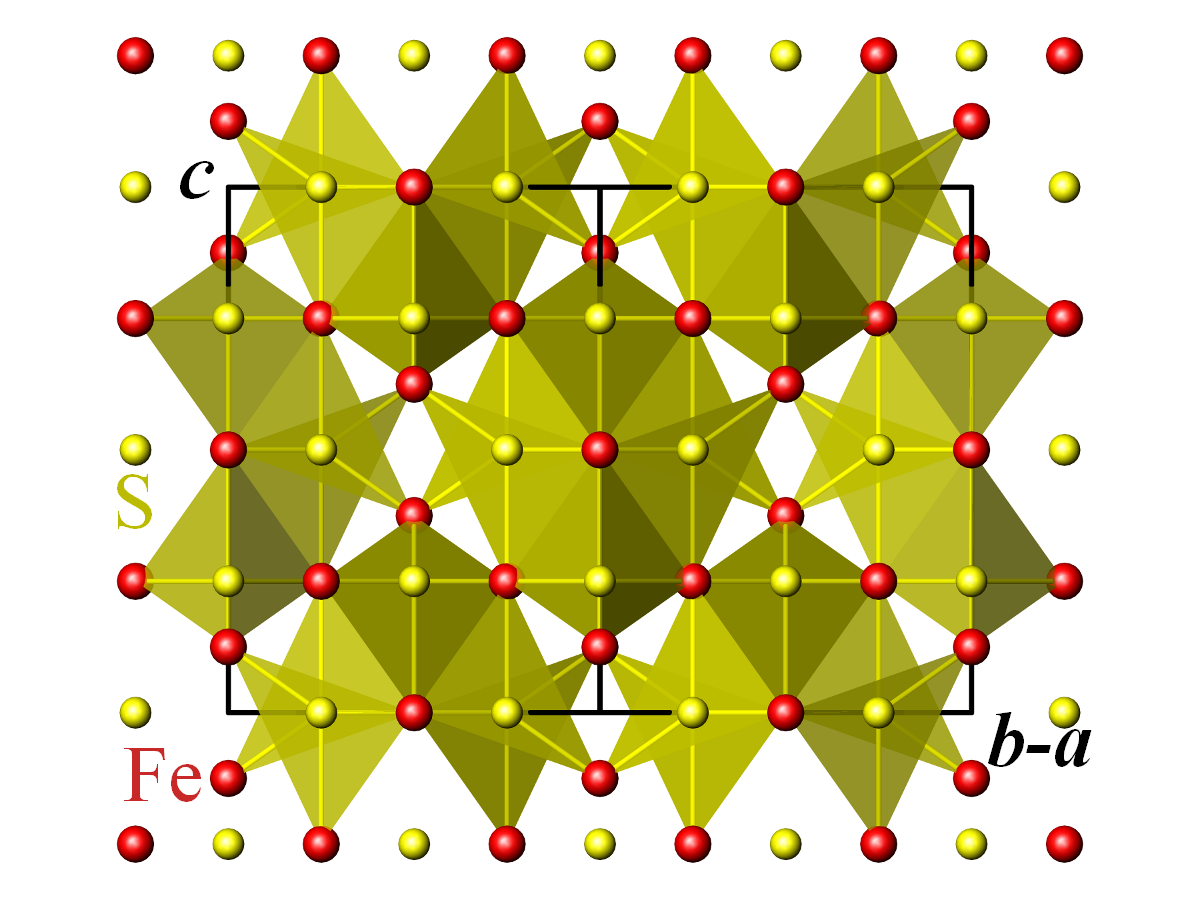
Emphasis on the SFe_{4} tetrahedra.

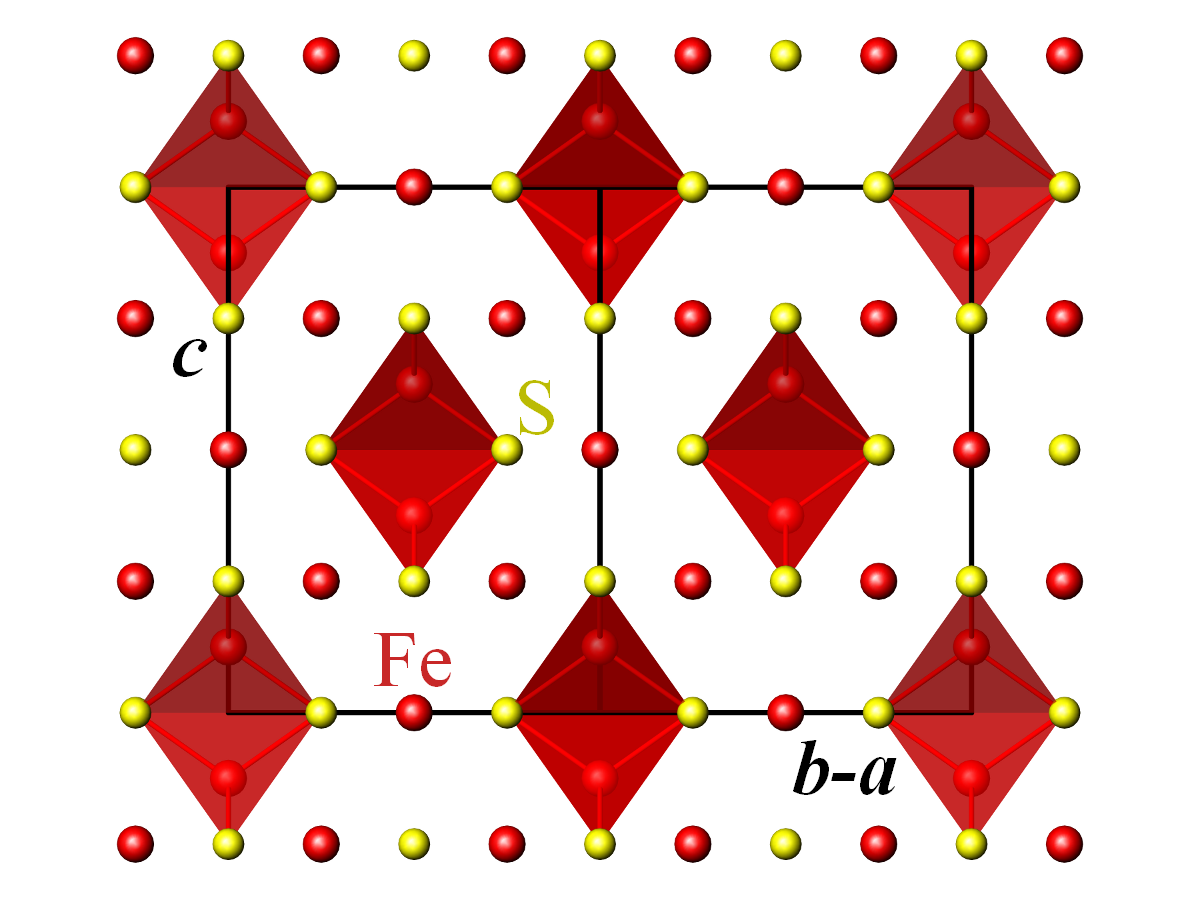
Emphasis on the FeS_{4} tetrahedra

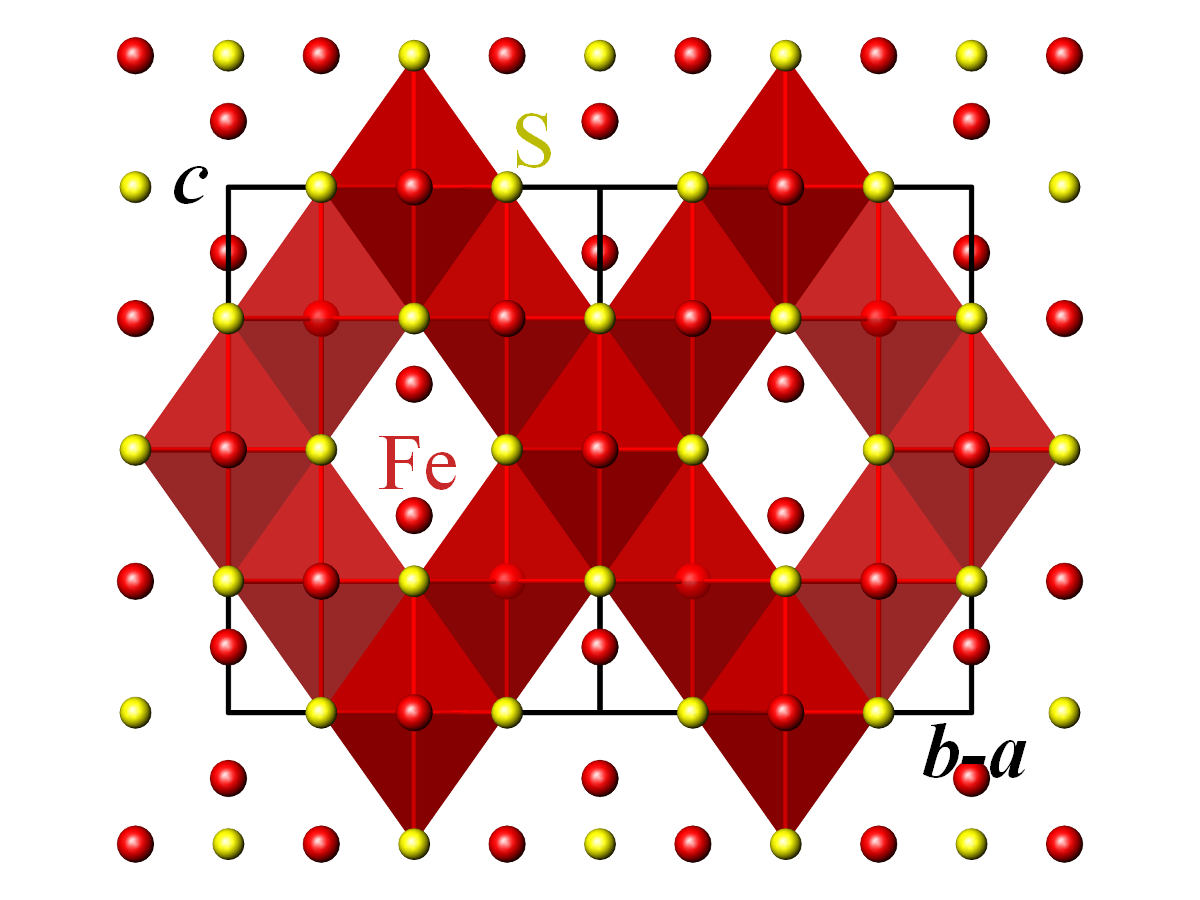
Emphasis on the FeS_{6} octahedra

== Magnetic and electronic properties ==
Like the related oxide magnetite (Fe_{3}O_{4}), iron(II,III) sulfide is ferrimagnetic, with the spin magnetic moments of the Fe^{III} centers in the tetrahedral sites oriented in the opposite direction as those in the octahedral sites, and a net magnetization. Both metal sites have high spin quantum numbers. The electronic structure of greigite is that of a half metal.
