= Magnetotaxis =

Bacteria movement with Earth's magnetic field

Magnetotaxis is a process implemented by a diverse group of Gram-negative bacteria that involves orienting and coordinating movement in response to Earth's magnetic field. This process is mainly carried out by microaerophilic and anaerobic bacteria found in aquatic environments such as salt marshes, seawater, and freshwater lakes. By sensing the magnetic field, the bacteria are able to orient themselves towards environments with more favorable oxygen concentrations. This orientation towards more favorable oxygen concentrations allows the bacteria to reach these environments faster as opposed to random movement through Brownian motion.

== Overview ==
Magnetic bacteria (e.g. Magnetospirillum magnetotacticum) contain internal structures known as magnetosomes which are responsible for the process of magnetotaxis. After orienting to the magnetic field using the magnetosomes, the bacteria use flagella to swim along the magnetic field, towards the more favorable environment. Magnetotaxis has no impact on the average speed of the bacteria. However, magnetotaxis allows bacteria to guide their otherwise random movement. This process is similar in practice to aerotaxis, but governed by magnetic fields instead of oxygen concentrations. Magnetotaxis and aerotaxis often function together, as bacteria can use both magnetotactic and aerotactic systems to find proper oxygen concentrations. This is referred to as magneto-aerotaxis. By orienting towards the Earth's poles, marine bacteria are able to direct their movement downwards, towards the anaerobic/micro aerobic sediments. This allows bacteria to change metabolic environments, which can enable chemical cycles.

== Magnetosomes ==
Magnetosomes contain crystals - often magnetite (Fe_{3}O_{4}). Some extremophile bacteria from sulfurous environments, such as Magnetoglobus multicellularis have been isolated with greigite (an iron-sulfide compound Fe_{3}S_{4}). Some magnetotactic bacteria also contain pyrite (FeS_{2}) crystals, possibly as a transformation product of greigite. These crystals are contained within a bilayer membrane called the magnetosome membrane which is embedded with specific proteins. There are many different shapes of crystals. Crystal shape is typically consistent within a bacterial species. The most common arrangement of magnetosomes is in chains which allows a maximum magnetic dipole moment to be created. Within bacteria, there can be many chains of magnetosomes of different lengths that tend to align along the long axis of bacterial cell. The dipole moment created from the chains of magnetosomes allows the bacteria to align with the magnetic field as they move. Once magnetic bacteria die, they are able to orient themselves to the Earth's magnetic field but they are incapable of migrating along the field.

== Hemispheres and magnetic fields ==
In the northern hemisphere, north-seeking bacteria move downwards towards sediment (parallel to the magnetic field). In the southern hemisphere, south seeking bacteria dominate and move downwards toward the sediment (antiparallel to the magnetic field). It was originally thought by scientists that south seeking bacteria would move upwards in the north hemisphere, towards very high concentrations of oxygen. This would negatively select south seeking bacteria; so that north seeking bacteria dominate in the northern hemisphere and vice versa. However, south-seeking bacteria have been found in the northern hemisphere. Additionally, both north and south seeking magnetic bacteria, are found even at the Earth's magnetic equator, where the field is directed horizontally.

== See also ==
- Magnetoception
- Magnetotactic bacteria
