= Giant magnetofossils =

Microscopic magnetic minerals

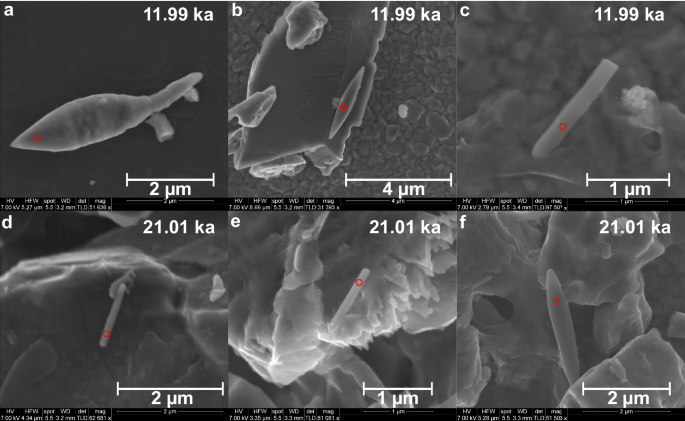
- SEM images of different types of giant magnetofossils from the late Quaternary Bay of Bengal sediments. SEM images of giant magnetofossils from Bay of Bengal sediments. Credit: Kadam et al., 2024.

Overview
- Type: Biogenic magnetic minerals
- Size: 1 – 4 μm
- Environment: Marine sediments, suboxic conditions
- Morphologies: Bullets, spindles, needles, spearheads
- Time range: ~97 Ma (Cretaceous) – ~50 kyr (late Quaternary)

Giant magnetofossils are microscopic (1 - 4 μm) magnetic minerals, typically a product of the biomineralization of magnetite (Fe_{3}O_{4}). They are associated with the umbrella of magnetofossils coinciding with conventional magnetofossils (20-200nm) which are ancestral remains of bacterial organisms (magnetotactic bacteria). The organisms associated with giant magnetofossils are hypothesized to be microbial but largely unknown because they have no modern or fossil analogs. Giant magnetofossils are found in marine sediments spanning from the Cretaceous (97 Ma) to the modern geologic record in the Cenozoic. Though they may occur in a wide range of various aquatic environments globally. They are particularly well-studied surrounding global climactic events i.e. the Paleocene-Eocene Thermal Maximum (~56 Ma).

There are 4 widely accepted morphologies of giant magnetofossils (bullets, spindles, needles, and spearheads). Largely their purpose is poorly understood outside of the preliminary hypothesis of their necessity is the organisms' navigational capabilities, protective armor, structural integrity, magnetic properties, or hardness which are all shape and size dependent. Their distinct morphology and chemical signature indicate that they must be of biogenic origin which is undisputed; however, the organism responsible for their creation and purpose is unknown.

== Climate ==
Preliminary evidence suggests that giant magnetofossils occur during climate shifts like global warming which causes a dramatic increase in weathering and sedimentation. Increases in weathering fuel an iron-rich environment and are associated with eutrophication of the water column which promotes biomineralization along or near the sediment-water interface in suboxic conditions. More work needs to be done to pinpoint ideal environments, however; there is likely more at play climactically in the biomineralization of giant magnetofossils.

Giant magnetofossil morphology is larger during increased weathering and potential abundance is still poorly understood, but appears in other intervals in smaller sizes and lower abundance in less ideal conditions. They correlate positively with warmer suboxic intervals but are not limited to this correlation.

== Magnetization ==
Giant magnetofossil magnetization is variable and is highly dependent on their size and morphology. They display high remnant capabilities highlighting their ability to remember the magnetization of the particle upon crystallization, this has potential for use as environmental proxies.

It is proposed that giant magnetofossil needle structures are used for navigational purposes highlighted by their single-domain magnetism while other varieties; i.e. spindles, bullets, and spearheads are not used for navigation but their purpose is still unclear. Bullets, depending on shape and size can be multi-domain (MD) magnetism or single-domain (SD). Large bullet structures appear to be in the vortex state. Spindles are stable single-domain or metastable single-domain. Needles are typically SD. A large spearhead resembles a pseudo-single domain with some vortex magnetic signatures indicating they could be for protection rather than navigation.

== Summary ==
Giant Magnetofossils are poorly understood; their origin, purpose, and abundance have not been constrained. Though it is understood that they are biogenically produced, much is left to be studied, especially their potential as environmental proxies and connection with widescale climactic events. They hold potentially valuable information that has yet to be determined.
