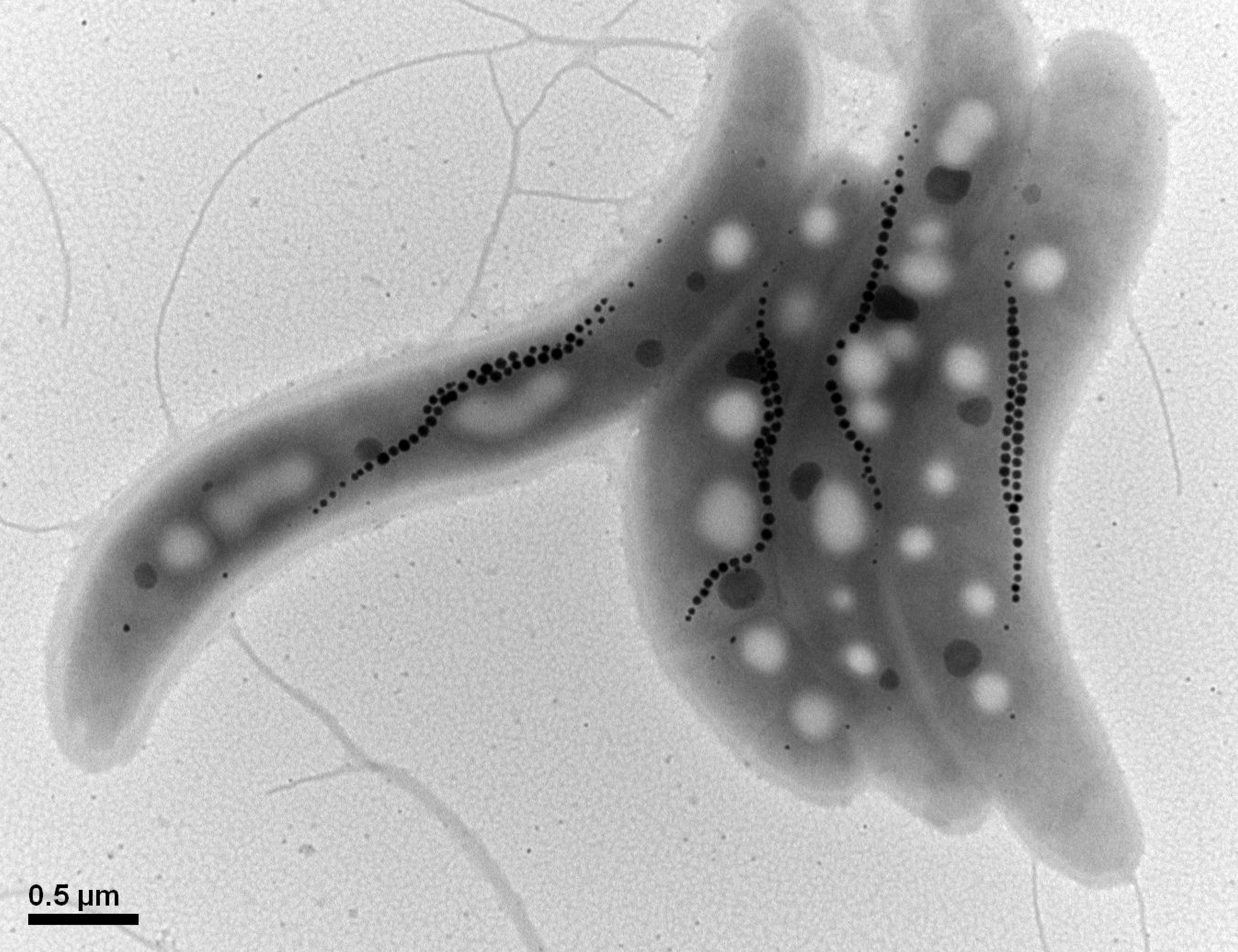
- Magnetospirillum gryphiswaldense bacteria with black magnetosome chains visible

Scientific classification
- Domain: Bacteria
- Kingdom: Pseudomonadati
- Phylum: Pseudomonadota
- Class: Alphaproteobacteria
- Order: Rhodospirillales
- Family: Rhodospirillaceae
- Genus: Magnetospirillum

Species
- "M. magnetotacticum"; M. gryphiswaldense; M. magneticum; M. bellicus; M. caucaseum; M. marisnigri; M. moscoviense; M. sp. MSM (7 strains); M. sp. MGT-1

Synonyms
- Phaeospirillum Imhoff et al. 1998

= Magnetospirillum =

Genus of bacteria

Magnetospirillum is a Gram-negative, microaerophilic genus of magnetotactic bacteria, first isolated from pond water by the microbiologist R. P. Blakemore in 1975. They have a spiral (helical) shape and are propelled by a polar flagellum at each end of their cells. The three main species identified are M. magnetotacticum strain MS-1, M. griphiswaldense strain MSR-1, and M. magneticum strain AMB-1.

== Habitat ==
The first discovered magnetotactic bacteria came from various environments including seawater, lakes, ponds, silt and soils in 1975 – including Magnetospirillum. The typical habitat of Magnetospirillum species consists of shallow fresh water and sediments, characterized by low concentrations of oxygen for growth (microaerophilic) where they live in the upper portion of the sediment (oxic/anoxic interface) and prefer an oxygen gradient of around 1–3%.

== Magnetotaxis ==
Probably the most peculiar characteristic of Magnetospirillum species is their capacity to orient themselves according to Earth's magnetic field, magnetotaxis. However, they are also impacted by artificial magnetic fields. This is achieved through the presence of special organelles called magnetosomes in the bacterium's cytoplasm. Because the magnetosomes in Magnetospirillum are arranged in chains, the bacteria are able to move with magnetic fields to find a favorable growth environment. However, species also resort to aerotaxis, to remain in favorable O_{2} concentration conditions. When the bacteria ingest iron, proteins inside their cells interact with it to produce tiny crystals of the mineral magnetite, the most magnetic mineral on Earth.

Purification of magnetosomes is accomplished by use of a magnetic separation column after disruption of the cell membrane. If a detergent is used on purified magnetosomes, they tend to agglomerate rather than staying in chain form. Due to the high quality of the single-domain magnetic crystals, a commercial interest has developed in the bacteria. The crystals are thought to have the potential to produce magnetic tapes and magnetic target drugs.

== Species ==
- Magnetospirillum bellicus
- Magnetospirillum caucaseum
- Magnetospirillum gryphiswaldense
- Magnetospirillum magnetotacticum—isolated from microaerobic zones of freshwater sediments. Differing from other chemoheterotrophs; the bacterium produces higher amounts of chelator in response to high iron concentrations.
- Magnetospirillum marisnigri
- Magnetospirillum moscoviense
- Magnetospirillum magneticum
- Magnetospirillum sp. MSM (7 strains) - collected from an Iowan freshwater pond.
- Magnetospirillum sp. MGT-1

== Potential Applications ==
Due to the presence of magnetotaxis and magnetosomes within Magnetospirillum, some species have been studied in how they may be beneficial for use in a wide range of different fields such as those with medicinal and engineering practices. One example is the recent research about how their magnetic properties could potentially introduce a new way of treating wastewater contaminated with heavy metals or be used for tumor hyperthermia due to their coupling abilities. However, it is a challenge to begin to test and apply their unique abilities because of the difficulty with growing large amounts of Magnetospirillum cells and magnetosomes – this could be due to most species being microaerophilic and having specific O_{2} concentration requirements.
