= Caenispirillum deserti =

Scientific classification
- Domain: Bacteria
- Kingdom: Pseudomonadati
- Phylum: Pseudomonadota
- Class: Alphaproteobacteria
- Order: Rhodospirillales
- Family: Rhodospirillaceae
- Genus: Caenispirillum
- Species: C. deserti

Binomial name
- Caenispirillum deserti Divyasree et al. 2015

Type strain
- JC232, JC252, KCTC 42064, NBRC 110150

Species of bacterium

Caenispirillum deserti is a Gram-negative, Vibrio-shaped, aerobic, spheroplast-forming and motile bacterium from the genus Caenispirillum which has been isolated from the salt desert in Kutch in India.
