= Roseospirillum parvum =

Scientific classification
- Domain: Bacteria
- Kingdom: Pseudomonadati
- Phylum: Pseudomonadota
- Class: Alphaproteobacteria
- Order: Rhodospirillales
- Family: Rhodospirillaceae
- Genus: Roseospirillum
- Species: R. parvum

Binomial name
- Roseospirillum parvum Glaeser and Overmann 2001

Type strain
- 930I, DSM 12498

Species of bacterium

Roseospirillum parvum is a phototrophic, nonsulfur, anaerobic and motile bacterium species from the genus of Roseospirillum with a bipolar flagella which has been isolated from the Sippewissett Salt Marsh in Cape Cod in Massachusetts in the United States.
