= Kala namak =

Kiln-fired rock salt from South Asia

Black salt
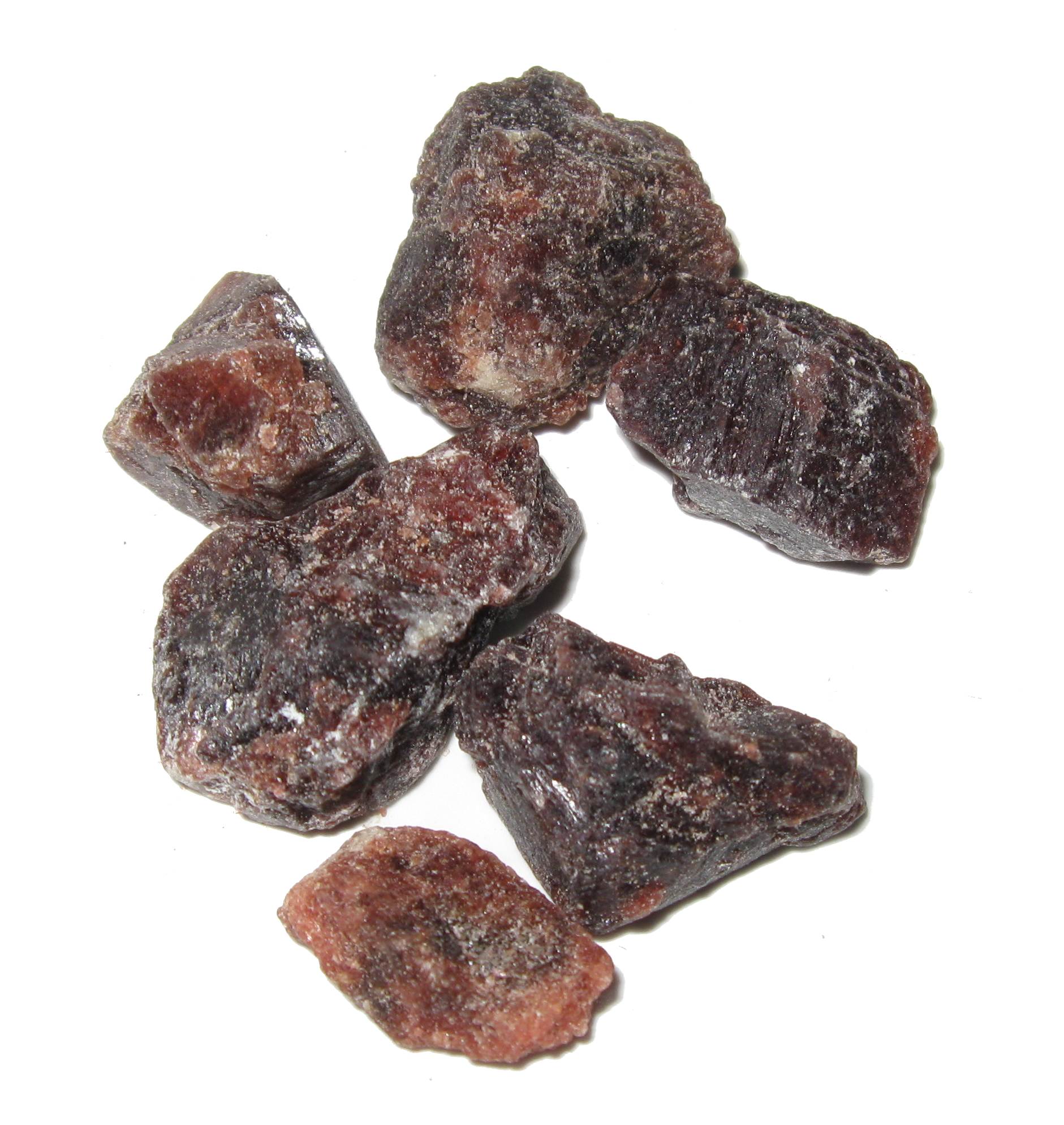
- Large pieces of Kala Namak
- Alternative names: Kala namak
- Region or state: South Asia, Himalayan regions

Black Salt (Hindi: काला नमक, Urdu: کالا نمک, lit. 'black salt') is a kiln-fired rock salt with a sulphurous, pungent smell used mainly in the countries of South Asia. It is also known as "Himalayan black salt", bit noon, bire noon, bit loona, bit lobon, kala loon, sanchal, kala meeth, guma loon, or pada loon, and is manufactured from the salts mined in the regions surrounding the Himalayas.

The condiment is composed largely of crystalline sodium chloride heated with charcoal and several other herbal components lending the salt its color and smell. The smell is mainly due to its sulphur content; the salt is heated in the presence of many herbal components and also contains greigite (Fe_{3}S_{4}, Iron(II,III) sulphide). When whole, the salt is brown and black. When ground into a powder, its color may range from pink to black-brown to dark black.

== Production ==
The raw material for producing kala namak was originally manufactured from natural halite from mines in Northern India in certain locations of the Himalayas, and brine from the North Indian salt lakes of Sambhar or Didwana.

Traditionally, the salt was transformed from its relatively colorless raw natural forms into the dark-colored commercially sold kala namak through a reductive chemical process that transforms some of the naturally occurring sodium sulphate of the raw salt into pungent hydrogen sulphide and sodium sulphide. This involves firing the raw salts in a kiln or furnace for 24 hours while sealed in a ceramic jar with charcoal along with small quantities of harad seeds, amla, bahera, babul bark, or natron. The fired salt melts, the chemical reaction occurs, and the salt is then cooled, stored, and aged prior to sale. Kala namak is prepared in this manner in northern India with production concentrated in Hisar district, Haryana. The salt-crystals appear black and are usually ground to a fine powder that is purple.

Although kala namak may have traditionally been chemically produced from impure deposits of salt (sodium chloride) with the required chemicals (small quantities of sodium sulphate, sodium bisulphate, and ferric sulphate) and charcoal in a furnace it is now common to simply add the required chemicals to pure salt before firing. Reportedly, it is also possible to create similar products through reductive heat treatment of salt, 5-10% of sodium carbonate, sodium sulphate, and some sugar.

== Composition ==
Kala namak consists primarily of sodium chloride, with trace impurities of sodium sulphate, sodium bisulphate, sodium bisulphite, sodium sulphide, iron sulphide, and hydrogen sulphide.

Sodium chloride provides kala namak with its salty taste, iron sulphide provides its dark violet hue, and all the sulphur compounds give kala namak its slight savory taste as well as a highly-distinctive smell, with hydrogen sulphide being the most prominent contributor to the smell. The acidic bisulphates/bisulphites contribute a mildly sour taste. Although hydrogen sulphide is toxic in high concentrations, the amount present in kala namak used in food is small and thus its effects on health are negligible.

== Uses ==
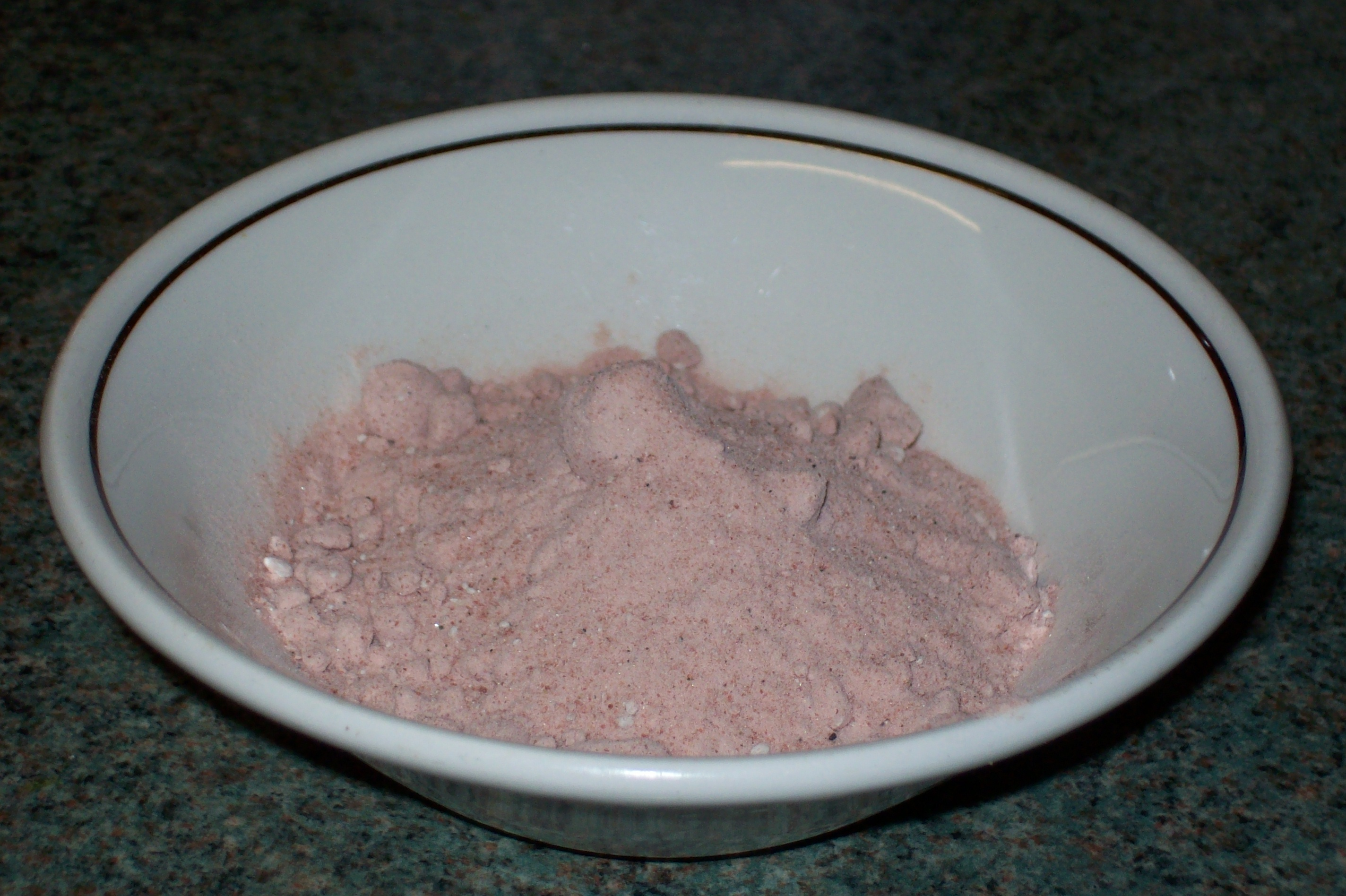
Powdered kala namak

Kala namak is used extensively in South Asian cuisines of India, Pakistan, Bangladesh, and Nepal as a condiment or added to chaats, chutneys, salads, fruit, raitas, and many other savory snacks. Chaat masala, a South Asian spice blend, is dependent upon black salt for its characteristic sulphurous egg-like aroma. Those who are not accustomed to black salt may describe the smell as resembling flatulence. Black salt is sometimes used sparingly as a topping for fruits or snacks in North India and Pakistan.

Kala namak is sometimes applied to tofu in vegan egg recipes.

Kala namak is considered a cooling spice in Ayurveda and is used as a laxative and digestive aid. It is also been noted to relieve flatulence and heartburn. It is used in Jammu to cure goiters. This salt is also used to treat hysteria and for making toothpastes by combining it with other mineral and plant ingredients. The uses for goiter and hysteria are dubious. Goiter, due to dietary iodine deficiency, would not be remedied unless iodide was present in the natural salt. In the United States, the Food and Drug Administration warned a manufacturer of dietary supplements, including one consisting of Himalayan salt, to discontinue marketing the products using unproven claims of health benefits.

== See also ==
- Black lava salt
- Himalayan salt
- Jugyeom
- Thursday salt
