= Joseph W. Greig =

American geochemist and physical chemist, Pennsylvania State University, State College

Joseph W. Greig (1895–1977) was a Canadian-born American geochemist and physical chemist, a pioneer in high temperature phase equilibria and immiscibility investigations of oxides and sulfides. His name has been assigned to a new magnetic mineral, greigite (Fe_{3}S_{4}) discovered in 1963, increasing to nine the number of minerals known to have been named after Queen's geologists.

== Career ==
Greig was born in Ontario, Canada in 1895. He studied geology and mineralogy at Queen's University before graduating at Columbia University. He received his Ph.D. from Harvard University and then worked at the Carnegie Institute for thirty-eight years. Once he retired in 1960, he became a visiting professor at Pennsylvania State University. He also served in the World War I with the Canadian Expeditionary Force, and in the second World War with the United States Bomber Command in the Pacific Theatre.

He was known and appreciated for his critical mind, very helpful for reviewing scientific papers and improving research proposals. As he first applied his criticism to his own works more than to these of others, it was also an obstacle to his publications and many of his works remain unpublished for this reason.

== Greigite (Fe_{3}S_{4}) ==
In 1963, a newly-discovered mineral was named "greigite" in his honor and in recognition of his contributions to mineralogy and physical chemistry. The new mineral, Fe_{3}S_{4}, a magnetic iron sulfide, equivalent of magnetite (Fe_{3}O_{4}), was discovered in San Bernardino County, California, by the US Geological Survey.
