= Black salt =

Black salt may refer to:

- Kala namak, a type of rock salt, salty and pungent-smelling condiment used in South Asia
- Black lava salt, a sea salt blended with activated charcoal
