= Caenispirillum bisanense =

Scientific classification
- Domain: Bacteria
- Kingdom: Pseudomonadati
- Phylum: Pseudomonadota
- Class: Alphaproteobacteria
- Order: Rhodospirillales
- Family: Rhodospirillaceae
- Genus: Caenispirillum
- Species: C. bisanense

Binomial name
- Caenispirillum bisanense Yoon et al. 2007

Type strain
- JCM 14346, KCTC 12839, K92

Synonyms
- Caenimicrobium bisanense

Species of bacterium

Caenispirillum bisanense is a Gram-negative, helical-shaped, non-spore-forming and motile bacterium from the genus Caenispirillum which has been isolated from dye works sludge from Korea.
