= Caenispirillum salinarum =

Scientific classification
- Domain: Bacteria
- Kingdom: Pseudomonadati
- Phylum: Pseudomonadota
- Class: Alphaproteobacteria
- Order: Rhodospirillales
- Family: Rhodospirillaceae
- Genus: Caenispirillum
- Species: C. salinarum

Binomial name
- Caenispirillum salinarum Ritika et al. 2012

Type strain
- JCM 17360, MTCC 10963, AK4

Species of bacterium

Caenispirillum salinarum is a Gram-negative, Vibrio-shaped and motile bacterium from the genus Caenispirillum which has been isolated from a solar saltern in Kakinada in India.
