= Roseospirillum =

Scientific classification
- Domain: Bacteria
- Kingdom: Pseudomonadati
- Phylum: Pseudomonadota
- Class: Alphaproteobacteria
- Order: Rhodospirillales
- Family: Rhodospirillaceae
- Genus: Roseospirillum; Glaeser and Overmann 2001

Type species
- Roseospirillum parvum

Species
- R. parvum

Genus of bacteria

Roseospirillum is a genus of bacteria from the family of Rhodospirillaceae.
