= Caenispirillum =

Scientific classification
- Domain: Bacteria
- Kingdom: Pseudomonadati
- Phylum: Pseudomonadota
- Class: Alphaproteobacteria
- Order: Rhodospirillales
- Family: Rhodospirillaceae
- Genus: Caenispirillum; Yoon et al. 2007

Type species
- Caenispirillum bisanense

Species
- Caenispirillum bisanense Caenispirillum deserti Caenispirillum humi Caenispirillum salinarum

Genus of bacteria

Caenispirillum is a bacterial genus from the family Rhodospirillaceae.
