= Buena Vista Mine, Nevada =

Iron ore mine in Nevada, United States

Coordinates: 39°58′29″N 118°10′18″W

The Buena Vista Mine is located 21 miles (34 km) southeast of Lovelock, Nevada. In the past, the area has been known as the Mineral Basin (discovered in 1880), though another name for the area has been the Buena Vista District. There are at least two other Buena Vista Mining Districts in Nevada; one is located near Unionville, Nevada, and the other is located in Esmeralda and Mineral counties near the California border. The nearby Buena Vista Hills are named for the mine. The district encompasses roughly 21 square miles (54 km^{2}) of mineral and surface rights, and is one of the largest un-mined iron ore resources in the western United States.

== History ==
In the late 1880s, 500 tons of ore were shipped to Union Iron Works in San Francisco. However, when it was determined that most of the ore was on Central Pacific Railroad land, operations were suspended. Production was recorded in 1943 and continued intermittently on the Thomas, Dodge, Segerstrom, and Buena Vista deposits until the 1960s. Total production was about 4 million tons, all of it high-grade 'lump' ore consisting of magnetite and minor hematite.

In 2006 high steel prices renewed iron ore exploration which renewed interest in the district. Several different companies funded exploration efforts, including geophysical exploration as well as drilling. This exploration significantly boosted reserves.

In late 2009 for the first time, the entirety of the Buena Vista Iron District was presented for sale by Western Resources Group and priced at $75 million.

In June 2011, Richmond Mining LTD, an Australian mining company (RHM:ASX), received a special use permit to develop the Buena Vista Iron Ore Mine in Churchill County, Nevada. The permit includes a 25 miles (40 km) slurry pipeline north to Colado Siding near Interstate 80 and annual use of up to 1,750 acre-feet (570,000,000 US gal) of water.

In 2011 an exploration campaign was undertaken by Nevada Metal Mines LLC in areas of the district that had previously been overlooked. The exploration, which included ground magnetic surveys and geophysical data analysis of those surveys, has indicated the potential for several million tons of iron ore. Samples taken from these areas all assayed to be of direct shipping grade, more than of 66% total iron.

In 2020, Nevada Iron LLC became a wholly owned subsidiary of Magnum Mining and Exploration Ltd (ASX MGU). Nevada Iron is developing the Buena Vista iron ore resources into an integrated carbon-neutral pig iron operation. The products are for electric arc furnace steelmakers. The integrated operation is to become the first green pig iron producer in the USA.

== Geology ==
The district is located within a Middle Jurassic volcano-plutonic complex composed of basaltic lavas and volcaniclastics underlain and intruded by gabbroic rocks. Mafic dikes are abundant and form sheeted dike swarms. The deposition of iron was not associated with silicification or sulfidation. Host rocks contain veins and large accumulations of pure magnetite in structural or breccia zones, or are impregnated with clots of magnetite in all size ranges. Magnetite is readily liberated from the host material by crushing and the iron is removed by magnetic or gravity separation. Veins of pure magnetite over of 10 feet thick are common in the open pits and drill intercepts. Oxidation has produced some hematite.

== Iron ore reserves ==
The district contains over 500 million tons of measured and indicated iron ore, with more suggested by magnetic and drill hole data.
