= Magnetotactic bacteria =

Polyphyletic group of bacteria

Magnetotactic bacteria (or MTB) are a polyphyletic group of bacteria that orient themselves along the magnetic field lines of Earth's magnetic field. Discovered in 1963 by Salvatore Bellini and rediscovered in 1975 by Richard Blakemore, this alignment is believed to aid these organisms in reaching regions of optimal oxygen concentration. To perform this task, these bacteria have organelles called magnetosomes that contain magnetic crystals. The biological phenomenon of microorganisms tending to move in response to the environment's magnetic characteristics is known as magnetotaxis. However, this term is misleading in that every other application of the term taxis involves a stimulus-response mechanism. In contrast to the magnetoreception of animals, the bacteria contain fixed magnets that force the bacteria into alignment—even dead cells are dragged into alignment, just like a compass needle.

== Introduction ==
The first description of magnetotactic bacteria was in 1963 by Salvatore Bellini of the University of Pavia. While observing bog sediments under his microscope, Bellini noticed a group of bacteria that evidently oriented themselves in a unique direction. He realized these microorganisms moved according to the direction of the North Pole, and hence called them "magnetosensitive bacteria". The publications were academic (peer-reviewed by the Istituto di Microbiologia's editorial committee under responsibility of the Institute's Director Prof. L. Bianchi, as usual in European universities at the time) and communicated in Italian with English, French and German short summaries in the official journal of a well-known institution, yet unexplainedly seem to have attracted little attention until they were brought to the attention of Richard Frankel in 2007. Frankel translated them into English and the translations were published in the Chinese Journal of Oceanography and Limnology.

Richard Blakemore, then a microbiology graduate student at the University of Massachusetts at Amherst, working in the Woods Hole Oceanographic Institution in whose collections the pertinent publications of the Institute of Microbiology of the University of Pavia were extant, observed microorganisms following the direction of Earth's magnetic field. Blakemore did not mention Bellini's research in his own report, which he published in Science, but was able to observe magnetosome chains using an electron microscope. Bellini's terms for this behavior, namely Italian: batteri magnetosensibili, French: bactéries magnétosensibles or bactéries aimantées, German: magnetisch empfindliche Bakterien and English: magnetosensitive bacteria (Bellini's first publication, last page), went forgotten, and Blakemore's "magnetotaxis" was adopted by the scientific community.

These bacteria have been the subject of many experiments. They have even been aboard the Space Shuttle to examine their magnetotactic properties in the absence of gravity, but a definitive conclusion was not reached.

The sensitivity of magnetotactic bacteria to the Earth's magnetic field arises from the fact these bacteria precipitate chains of crystals of magnetic minerals within their cells. To date, all magnetotactic bacteria are reported to precipitate either magnetite or greigite. These crystals, and sometimes the chains of crystals, can be preserved in the geological record as magnetofossils. The oldest unambiguous magnetofossils come from the Cretaceous chalk beds of southern England, though less certain reports of magnetofossils extend to 1.9 billion years old Gunflint chert. There have also been claims of their existence on Mars based on the shape of magnetite particles within the Martian meteorite ALH84001, but these claims are highly contested.

== Biology ==
Several different morphologies (shapes) of MTB exist, differing in number, layout and pattern of the bacterial magnetic particles (BMPs) they contain. The MTBs can be subdivided into two categories, according to whether they produce particles of magnetite (Fe_{3}O_{4}) or of greigite (Fe_{3}S_{4}), although some species are capable of producing both. Magnetite possesses a magnetic moment with three times the magnitude of greigite.

Magnetite-producing magnetotactic bacteria are usually found in an oxic-anoxic transition zone (OATZ), the transition zone between oxygen-rich and oxygen-starved water or sediment. Many MTB are able to survive only in environments with very limited oxygen, and some can exist only in completely anaerobic environments. It has been postulated that the evolutionary advantage of possessing a system of magnetosomes is linked to the ability to efficiently navigate within this zone of sharp chemical gradients by simplifying a potential three-dimensional search for more favorable conditions to a single dimension. (See § Magnetism for a description of this mechanism.) Some types of magnetotactic bacteria can produce magnetite even in anaerobic conditions, using nitric oxide, nitrate, or sulfate as a final acceptor for electrons. The greigite mineralizing MTBs are usually strictly anaerobic.

It has been suggested MTB evolved in the early Archean Eon, as the increase in atmospheric oxygen meant that there was an evolutionary advantage for organisms to have magnetic navigation. Magnetosomes first evolved as a defense mechanism in response to the increase of reactive oxygen species (ROS) that resulted from the Great Oxygenation Event. Organisms began to store iron in some form, and this intracellular iron was later adapted to form magnetosomes for magnetotaxis. These early MTB may have participated in the formation of the first eukaryotic cells. Biogenic magnetite similar to that found in magnetotactic bacteria has been also found in higher organisms, from euglenoid algae to trout. Reports in humans and pigeons are far less advanced.

Magnetotactic bacteria organize their magnetosomes in linear chains. The magnetic dipole moment of the cell is therefore the sum of the dipole moment of each BMP, which is then sufficient to passively orient the cell and overcome the casual thermal forces found in a water environment. In the presence of more than one chain, the inter-chain repulsive forces will push these structures to the edge of the cell, inducing turgor.

Nearly all of the genes relevant to magnetotaxis in MTB are located in an approximately 80 kilobase region in the genome called the magnetosome island. There are three main operons in the magnetosome island: the mamAB operon, the mamGFDC operon, and the mms6 operon. There are 9 genes that are essential for the formation and function of modern magnetosomes: mamA, mamB, mamE, mamI, mamK, mamM, mamO, mamP, and mamQ. In addition to these 9 genes that are well conserved across all MTB, there are more than 30 total genes that contribute to magnetotaxis in MTB. These non-essential genes account for the variation in magnetite/greigite crystal size and shape, as well as the specific alignment of magnetosomes in the cell.

The diversity of MTB is reflected by the high number of different morphotypes found in environmental samples of water or sediment. Commonly observed morphotypes include spherical or ovoid cells (cocci), rod-shaped (bacilli), and spiral bacteria of various dimensions. One of the more distinctive morphotypes is an apparently multicellular bacterium referred to as multicellular magnetotactic bacteria (MMB).

Regardless of their morphology, all MTB studied so far are motile by means of flagella and are gram-negative bacteria of various phyla. Despite the majority of known species being Pseudomonadota, e.g. Magnetospirillum magneticum, an alphaproteobacterium, members of various phyla possess the magnetosome gene cluster, such as Candidatus Magnetobacterium bavaricum, a Nitrospira. The arrangement of flagella differs and can be polar, bipolar, or in tufts. The first phylogenetic analysis on magnetotactic bacteria using 16S rRNA gene sequence comparisons was performed by P. Eden et al. in 1991.

Another trait that shows considerable diversity is the arrangement of magnetosomes inside the bacterial cell. In the majority of MTB, the magnetosomes are aligned in chains of various lengths and numbers along the cell's long axis, which is magnetically the most efficient orientation. However, dispersed aggregates or clusters of magnetosomes occur in some MTB, usually at one side of the cell, which often corresponds to the site of flagellar insertion. Besides magnetosomes, large inclusion bodies containing elemental sulfur, polyphosphate, or poly-β-hydroxybutyrate are common in MTB.

The most abundant type of MTB occurring in environmental samples, especially sediments, are coccoid cells possessing two flagellar bundles on a somewhat flattened side. This "bilophotrichous" type of flagellation gave rise to the tentative genus "Bilophococcus" for these bacteria. In contrast, two of the morphologically more conspicuous MTB, regularly observed in natural samples, but never isolated in pure culture, are the MMB and a large rod containing copious amounts of hook-shaped magnetosomes (Magnetobacterium bavaricum).

== Magnetism ==
The physical development of a magnetic crystal is governed by two factors: one is moving to align the magnetic force of the molecules in conjunction with the developing crystal, while the other reduces the magnetic force of the crystal, allowing an attachment of the molecule while experiencing an opposite magnetic force. In nature, this causes the existence of a magnetic domain, surrounding the perimeter of the domain, with a thickness of approximately 150 nm of magnetite, within which the molecules gradually change orientation. For this reason, the iron is not magnetic in the absence of an applied field. Likewise, extremely small magnetic particles do not exhibit signs of magnetisation at room temperature; their magnetic force is continuously altered by the thermal motions inherent in their composition. Instead, individual magnetite crystals in MTB are of a size between 35 and 120 nm, that is; large enough to have a magnetic field and at the same time small enough to remain a single magnetic domain.

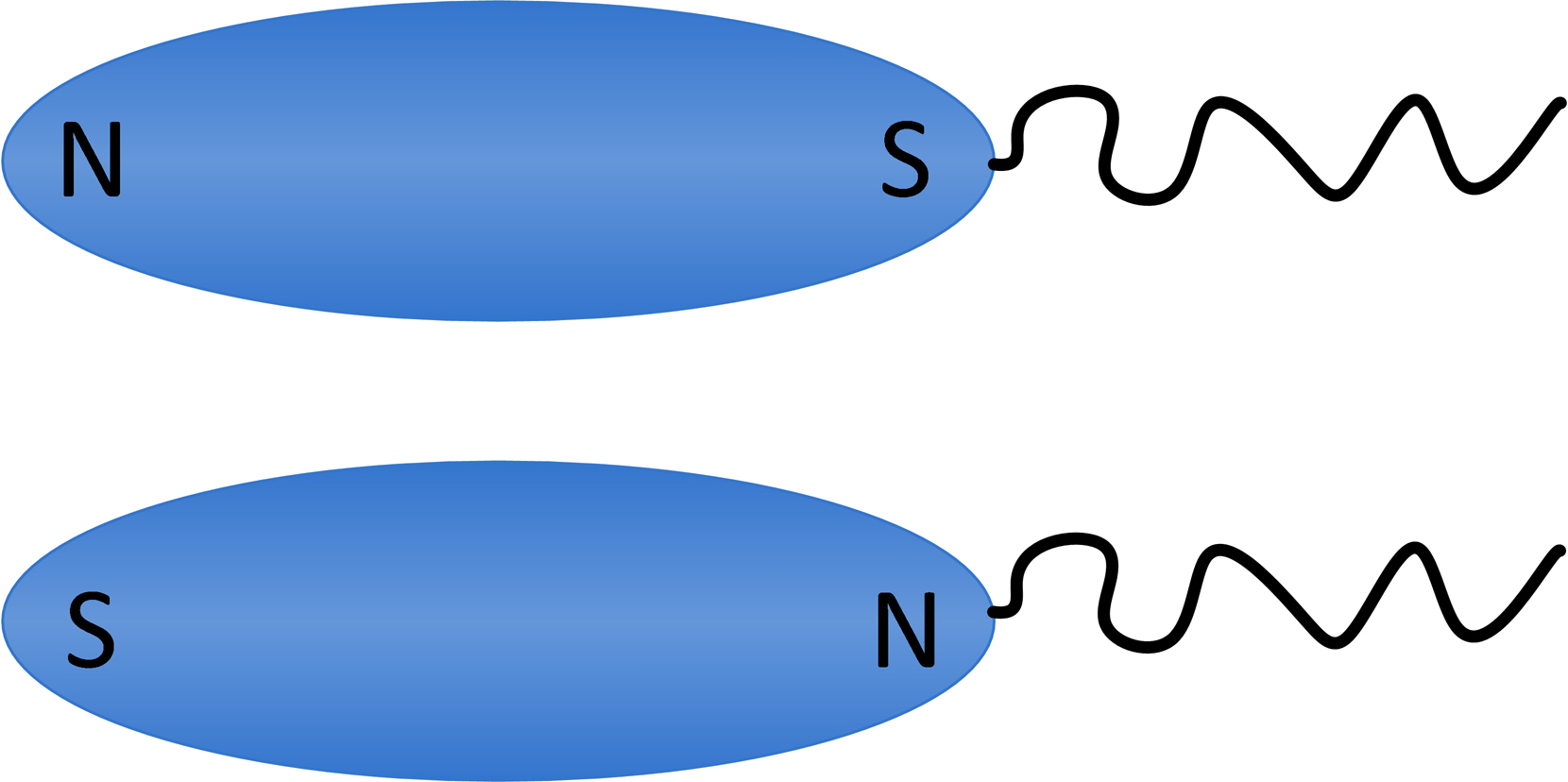
The MTB polarity model

The inclination of the Earth's magnetic field in the two respective hemispheres selects one of the two possible polarities of the magnetotactic cells (with respect to the flagellated pole of the cell), orienting the biomineralisation of the magnetosomes.

Aerotaxis is the response by which bacteria migrate to an optimal oxygen concentration in an oxygen gradient. Various experiments have clearly shown that magnetotaxis and aerotaxis work in conjunction in magnetotactic bacteria. It has been shown that, in water droplets, one-way swimming magnetotactic bacteria can reverse their swimming direction and swim backwards under reducing conditions (less than optimal oxygen concentration), as opposed to oxic conditions (greater than optimal oxygen concentration). The behaviour that has been observed in these bacterial strains has been referred to as magneto-aerotaxis.

Two different magneto-aerotactic mechanisms—known as polar and axial—are found in different MTB strains. Some strains that swim persistently in one direction along the magnetic field (either north-seeking [NS] or south-seeking [SS])—mainly the magnetotactic cocci—are polar magneto-aerotactic. These magnetotactic bacteria will travel along the lines of the earth's magnetic field according to their orientation, but will swerve as a group and reverse direction if exposed to a local, more powerful and oppositely-oriented magnetic field. In this way, they continue to travel in the same magnetic direction, but relative instead to the local field. Those MTB that swim in either direction along magnetic field lines with frequent, spontaneous reversals of swimming direction without turning around—for example, freshwater spirilla—are axial magneto-aerotactic and the distinction between NS and SS does not apply to these bacteria. The magnetic field provides both an axis and a direction of motility for polar magneto-aerotactic bacteria, whereas it only provides an axis of motility for axial types of bacteria. In both cases, magnetotaxis increases the efficiency of aerotaxis in vertical concentration gradients by reducing a three-dimensional search to a single dimension.

Scientists have also proposed an extension of the described model of magneto-aerotaxis to a more complex redoxtaxis. In this case, the unidirectional movement of MTB in a drop of water would be only one aspect of a sophisticated redox-controlled response. One hint for the possible function of polar magnetotaxis could be that most of the representative microorganisms are characterised by possessing either large sulfur inclusions or magnetosomes consisting of iron-sulfides. Therefore, it may be speculated that the metabolism of these bacteria, being either chemolithoautotrophic or mixotrophic, is strongly dependent on the uptake of reduced sulfur compounds, which occurs in many habitats only in deeper regions at or below the OATZ due to the rapid chemical oxidation of these reduced chemical species by oxygen or other oxidants in the upper layers.

Microorganisms belonging to the genus Thioploca, for example, use nitrate, which is stored intracellularly, to oxidize sulfide, and have developed vertical sheaths in which bundles of motile filaments are located. It is assumed that Thioploca use these sheathes to move efficiently in a vertical direction in sediment, thereby accumulating sulfide in deeper layers and nitrate in upper layers. For some MTB, it might also be necessary to perform excursions to anoxic zones of their habitat to accumulate reduced sulfur compounds.

== Magnetosomes ==
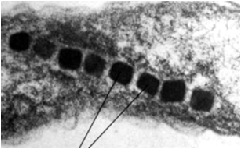
A magnetosome organised as chains of compartments in the bacterium

The biomineralisation of magnetite (Fe_{3}O_{4}) requires regulating mechanisms to control the concentration of iron, the crystal nucleation, the redox potential and the acidity (pH). This is achieved by means of compartmentalisation in structures known as magnetosomes that allow the biochemical control of the above-mentioned processes. After the genome of several MTB species had been sequenced, a comparative analysis of the proteins involved in the formation of the BMP became possible. Sequence homology with proteins belonging to the ubiquitous cation diffusion facilitator (CDF) family and the "Htr-like" serine proteases has been found. While the first group is exclusively dedicated to the transport of heavy metals, the second group consists of heat shock proteins (HSPs) involved in the degradation of badly folded proteins. Other than the serine protease domain, some proteins found in the magnetosomial membrane (MM) also contain PDZ domains, while several other MM proteins contain tetratricopeptide repeat (TPR) domains.

=== TPR domain ===
The TPR domains are characterized by a folding consisting of two α-helices and include a highly conserved consensus sequence of 8 amino acids (of the 34 possible), which is the most common in nature. Apart from these amino acids, the remainder of the structure is found to be specialised in relation to its functional significance. The more notable compounds that comprise TPR domains include:

1. membrane-bound transport complexes conveying proteins within mitochondria and/or peroxisomes
2. complexes that recognise DNA-binding proteins and repress DNA transcription
3. the anaphase-promoting complex (APC).

Examples of both the TPR-TPR interactions, as well as TPR-nonTPR interactions, have been reported.

=== PDZ domain ===
The PDZ domains are structures that consist of 6 β-filaments and 2 α-helices that recognise the C-terminal amino acids of proteins in a sequence-specific manner. Usually, the third residue from the C-terminal is phosphorylated, preventing interaction with the PDZ domain. The only conserved residues in these structures are those involved in the recognition of the carboxy terminal. PDZ domains are quite widespread in nature, since they constitute the basic structure upon which multiproteinic complexes are assembled. This is especially true for those associated with membrane proteins, such as the inward rectifier K^{+} channels or the β_{2}-adrenergic receptors.

=== Membrane and proteins ===
The formation of the magnetosome requires at least three steps:

1. Invagination of the magnetosome membrane (MM)
2. Entrance of magnetite precursors into the newly formed vesicle
3. Nucleation and growth of the magnetite crystal

The first formation of an invagination in the cytoplasmic membrane is triggered by a GTPase. It is supposed this process can take place amongst eukaryotes, as well.

The second step requires the entrance of ferric ions into the newly formed vesicles from the external environment. Even when cultured in a Fe^{3+} deficient medium, MTB succeed at accumulating high intracellular concentrations of this ion. It has been suggested that they accomplish this by secreting, upon need, a siderophore, a low-molecular-weight ligand displaying an elevated affinity for Fe^{3+} ions. The "Fe^{3+}-siderophore" complex is subsequently moved in the cytoplasm, where it is cleaved. The ferric ions must then be converted into the ferrous form (Fe^{2+}), to be accumulated within the BMP; this is achieved by means of a transmembrane transporter, which exhibits sequence homology with a Na^{+}/H^{+} antiporter. Furthermore, the complex is a H^{+}/Fe^{2+} antiporter, which transports ions via the proton gradient. These transmembrane transporters are localised both in the cytoplasmic membrane and in the MM, but in an inverted orientation; this configuration allows them to generate an efflux of Fe^{2+} ions at the cytoplasmic membrane, and an influx of this same ion at the MM. This step is strictly controlled by a cytochrome-dependent redox system, which is not yet fully explained and appears to be species-specific.

During the final stage of the process, the magnetite crystal nucleation is by action of transmembrane proteins with acidic and basic domains. One of these proteins, called Mms6, has also been employed for the artificial synthesis of magnetite, where its presence allows the production of crystals homogeneous in shape and size.

It is likely that many other proteins associated with the MM could be involved in other roles, such as generation of supersaturated concentrations of iron, maintenance of reducing conditions, oxidisation of iron, and partial reduction and dehydration of hydrated iron compounds.

=== Biomineralisation ===
Several clues led to the hypothesis that different genetic sets exist for the biomineralisation of magnetite and greigite. In cultures of Magnetospirillum magnetotacticum, iron can not be replaced with other transition metals (Ti, Cr, Co, Cu, Ni, Hg, Pb) commonly found in the soil. In a similar manner, oxygen and sulfur are not interchangeable as nonmetallic substances of the magnetosome within the same species.

From a thermodynamic point of view, in the presence of a neutral pH and a low redox potential, the inorganic synthesis of magnetite is favoured when compared to those of other iron oxides. It would thus appear microaerophilic or anaerobic conditions create a suitable potential for the formation of BMPs. Moreover, all iron absorbed by the bacteria is rapidly converted into magnetite, indicating the formation of crystals is not preceded by the accumulation of intermediate iron compounds; this also suggests the structures and the enzymes necessary for biomineralisation are already present within the bacteria. These conclusions are also supported by the fact that MTB cultured in aerobic conditions (and thus nonmagnetic) contain amounts of iron comparable to any other species of bacteria.

== Relationships with other species ==
Symbiosis with magnetotactic bacteria has been proposed as the explanation for magnetoreception in some marine protists. Besides, some species of protists can prey on MTB so that magnetosomes can accumulate in the cells. So protists can obtain the ability of magnetic response. Research is underway on whether a similar relationship may underlie magnetoreception in vertebrates as well.

== Biotechnology applications ==
In certain types of applications, bacterial magnetite offers several advantages compared to chemically synthesized magnetite. Bacterial magnetosome particles, unlike those produced chemically, have a consistent shape, a narrow size distribution within the single magnetic domain range, and a membrane coating consisting of lipids and proteins. The magnetosome envelope allows for easy couplings of bioactive substances to its surface, a characteristic important for many applications.

Magnetotactic bacterial cells have been used to determine south magnetic poles in meteorites and rocks containing fine-grained magnetic minerals and for the separation of cells after the introduction of magnetotactic bacterial cells into granulocytes and monocytes by phagocytosis. Magnetotactic bacterial magnetite crystals have been used in studies of magnetic domain analysis and in many commercial applications including: the immobilisation of enzymes; the formation of magnetic antibodies, and the quantification of immunoglobulin G; the detection and removal of Escherichia coli cells with a fluorescein isothiocyanate conjugated monoclonal antibody, immobilised on magnetotactic bacterial magnetite particles; and the introduction of genes into cells, a technology in which magnetosomes are coated with DNA and "shot" using a particle gun into cells that are difficult to transform using more standard methods.

However, the prerequisite for any large-scale commercial application is mass cultivation of magnetotactic bacteria or the introduction and expression of the genes responsible for magnetosome synthesis into a bacterium, e.g., E. coli, that can be grown relatively cheaply to extremely large yields. Although some progress has been made, the former has not been achieved with the available pure cultures.
