= Magnetosome =

Organelle in magnetotactic bacteria

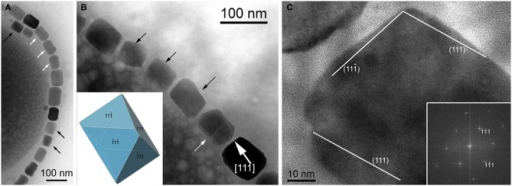
Magnetite magnetosomes in Gammaproteobacteria strain SS-5. (A) Chain of highly elongated magnetosomes. (B) Part of a magnetosome chain. (C) The magnetosome in the lower right in (B), viewed along the $\scriptstyle [1\overline{1}0]$ direction, with its Fourier transform in the lower right.

Magnetosomes are membranous structures present in magnetotactic bacteria (MTB). They contain iron-rich magnetic particles that are enclosed within a lipid bilayer membrane. Each magnetosome can often contain 15 to 20 magnetite crystals that form a chain which acts like a compass needle to orient magnetotactic bacteria in geomagnetic fields, thereby simplifying their search for their preferred microaerophilic environments. Recent research has shown that magnetosomes are invaginations of the inner membrane and not freestanding vesicles. Magnetite-bearing magnetosomes have also been found in eukaryotic magnetotactic algae, with each cell containing several thousand crystals.

Overall, magnetosome crystals have high chemical purity, narrow size ranges, species-specific crystal morphologies and exhibit specific arrangements within the cell. These features indicate that the formation of magnetosomes is under precise biological control and is mediated biomineralization.

Magnetotactic bacteria usually mineralize either iron oxide magnetosomes, which contain crystals of magnetite (Fe_{3}O_{4}), or iron sulfide magnetosomes, which contain crystals of greigite (Fe_{3}S_{4}). Several other iron sulfide minerals have also been identified in iron sulfide magnetosomes—including mackinawite (tetragonal FeS) and a cubic FeS—which are thought to be precursors of Fe_{3}S_{4}. One type of magnetotactic bacterium present at the oxic-anoxic transition zone (OATZ) of the southern basin of the Pettaquamscutt River Estuary, Narragansett, Rhode Island, United States is known to produce both iron oxide and iron sulfide magnetosomes.

== Function ==
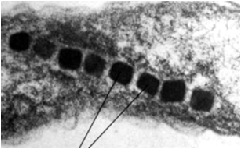
Magnetosomes arrowed

Magnetotactic bacteria are widespread, motile, diverse prokaryotes that biomineralize a unique organelle called the magnetosome. A magnetosome consists of a nano-sized crystal of a magnetic iron mineral, which is enveloped by a lipid bilayer membrane. In the cells of most all magnetotactic bacteria, magnetosomes are organized as well-ordered chains. The magnetosome chain causes the cell to behave as a motile, miniature compass needle where the cell aligns and swims parallel to magnetic field lines.

The magnetic dipole moment of the cell is often large enough that its interaction with Earth’s magnetic field overcomes the thermal forces that tend to randomize the orientation of the cell in its aqueous surroundings. Magnetotactic bacteria use aerotaxis as well. Aerotaxis is a response to changes in oxygen concentration that will favor swimming towards a zone of optimal oxygen concentration. Lakes' or oceans' oxygen concentration is commonly dependent on depth. If the Earth’s magnetic field has a significant downward slant, the orientation along field lines aids in the search for the optimal concentration; this process is called magneto-aerotaxis.

=== Mammalian magnetosome-like cells ===
Research has indicated the presence of magnetosome cells within human brain tissues. Biosynthesis of magnetite particles in vertebrates like mammals is implied to be similar to that observed in bacterial cells, although no evidence is provided. The difference between bacterial magnetosomes and human magnetosomes appears to be the number of magnetite particles synthesized per cell, the clustering of those particles within each respective organism, and the purpose of each magnetosome. A species of magnetosomic bacterial cell may have 20 magnetic particles arranged linearly in an organelle for each member of the species. A human may have between 1000 and 10000 magnetic particles arranged in a cluster within an organelle with only one cell in 5000 having said organelle. Finally, the human magnetosomic organelle has an unknown function that does not involve detecting the earth's magnetic field.

== Formation ==
Magnetotactic bacteria use a process known as biomineralization to exert an incredible degree of control on the formation of the mineral crystals within the magnetosomes. The process of biomineralization allows the MTB to control the shape and size along with the alignment of each individual magnetite crystal. These specific magnetite crystals are all identical within a species but between species they can vary in size, structure, formation, amount, but not purpose. They are always used to follow geomagnetic pulls to more agreeable climates for the bacteria.

These magnetite crystals are contained within an organelle envelope. This envelope is referred to as a magnetosome. Within the organelle there can either be ferrimagnetic crystals of magnetite (Fe_{3}O_{4}) or the iron sulfide greigite (Fe_{3}S_{4}). Recently there have been a few other magnetic compounds found but these are far less common and do not change the purpose of the organelle.

Around twenty proteins have been found in magnetotactic bacteria that are specifically used for the creation of magnetosomes. These proteins are responsible for the control of vesicle formation, magnetosome ion transport, and the crystallization of the magnetites and their arrangement with in the particular vesicle. The arrangement of the magnetites is critical because individually they are not very strong, but when linked in an ordered chain they increase significantly in strength. There is another set of acidic proteins in the magnetosome that are used to create a link between the vesicle and the cytoskeletal structure in the cell to help the magnetosome hold shape.

=== Magnetites ===
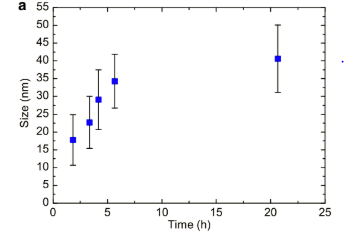
Lab Growth of magnetite crystals under controlled conditions to simulate growth within the magnetosome.

Magnetite crystals are encased in the magnetosome, giving the MTB its magnetic properties. These crystals can either be made of iron oxide or sulfide. The MTB may either have iron oxide or sulfide but not both. Certain subgroups of the Pseudomonadota in the domain of Bacteria have been found through analyses of the MTB’s RNA to only use iron oxide which is the more common material. Another smaller subdivision of the Pseudomonadota that are part of a sulfide reducing bacteria use iron sulfide. Scientists say this suggests independent evolution of the same trait. The magnetite crystals have been observed in three different morphologies, cuboid, rectangular, and arrowhead shaped.

==== Size of magnetite crystals ====
Magnetotactic crystals range anywhere in size from 30 nanometers to 120 nanometers. This size allows them to be magnetically stable and to help optimize the MTB ability toward magnetotaxis. The single domain crystals have the maximum possible magnetic moment per unit volume for a given composition. A smaller size would not be as efficient to contribute to the cellular magnetic moment, the smaller size crystals are superparamagnetic, therefore they are not continuously magnetic. Crystals exceeding 120 nanometers can form magnetic domains in opposition to the desired direction. While a single magnetosome chain could appear to be ideal for magneto-aerotaxis, a number of magnetotactic bacteria have magnetosomes or magnetosome arrangements that depart from the ideal. A reported example includes large magnetosomes (up to 200 nanometers) found in coccoid cells in Brazil. These cells contain enough magnetosomes that the calculated magnetic dipole moment of the cell is about 250 times larger than that of a typical Magnetospirillum magnetotacticum. Some bacteria have magnetosomes that are not arranged in chains, but the magnetosomes are clustered on one side of the cell. In this arrangement, the shape anisotropy of each crystal provides the stability against remagnetization, rather than the overall shape anisotropy in the magnetosome chain arrangement. These non-ideal arrangements may lead to additional, currently unknown functions of magnetosomes; possibly related to metabolism.

== Collapse ==
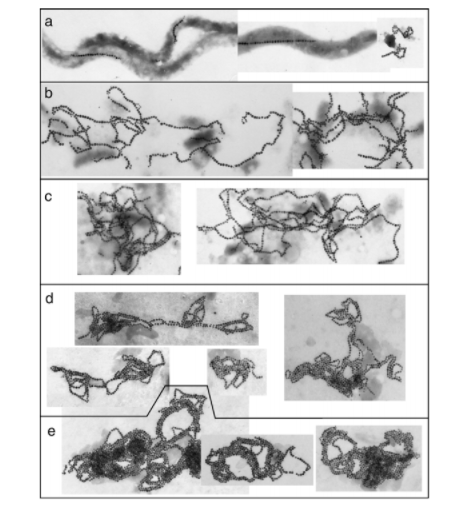
TEM Images of the progressive collapse of the magnetosome chain structures in cells.

When the magnetotactic crystals are in an unstable arrangement without additional support, the whole magnetosome will collapse. The collapse can occur during diagenesis and dolomitization. The magnetosome shape and elastic properties of biological membranes are what is holding the chains together, as well as the linearity and the connection to the cytoskeleton. With how much the geometries effect the stabilization of the chains of magnetosomes shows that they are intrinsically unstable. The cell wall and associated membrane structures have been thought to act to prevent magnetosome chain collapse. There has been data collected that indicates that magnetosome linearity persists long after cells are disrupted. Consistent with prior observations, in some magnetococcus, the magnetosome chains pass through the cell interior, precluding continuous contact with the cell wall and imply additional support structures exist in some species.
