= Rhodospirillaceae =

Scientific classification
- Domain: Bacteria
- Kingdom: Pseudomonadati
- Phylum: Pseudomonadota
- Class: Alphaproteobacteria
- Order: Rhodospirillales
- Family: Rhodospirillaceae

Genera
- Aerophototrophica Tang et al. 2021; Algihabitans Wang et al. 2019; Aliidongia Chen et al. 2017; Caenispirillum Yoon et al. 2007; "Dechlorospirillum" Michaelidou et al. 2000; Denitrobaculum Wang et al. 2020; Dongia Liu et al. 2010; Ferruginivarius Wang et al. 2019; Haematospirillum Humrighouse et al. 2016; Hwanghaeella Kim et al. 2019; Hypericibacter Noviana et al. 2020; Indioceanicola Chen et al. 2018; Insolitispirillum Yoon et al. 2007; "Levispirillum" Pot and Gillis 2005; Magnetospirillum Schleifer et al. 1992; Marispirillum Lai et al. 2009; Novispirillum Yoon et al. 2007; Oleiliquidispirillum Li et al. 2020; Oleisolibacter Ruan et al. 2019; Pararhodospirillum Lakshmi et al. 2014; Phaeovibrio Lakshmi et al. 2011; Rhodospira Pfennig et al. 1998; Rhodospirillum Molisch 1907 (Approved Lists 1980); Roseospira Imhoff et al. 1998; "Roseospirillum" Glaeser and Overmann 1999; Tagaea Jean et al. 2016; Telmatospirillum Sizova et al. 2007

Family of bacteria

The Rhodospirillaceae are a family of bacteria within the Pseudomonadota. The family is metabolically diverse, though it is known for its purple nonsulfur bacteria, which produce energy through photosynthesis. Originally, all purple nonsulfur bacteria were classified in this family.

Members of this family are often found in anaerobic aquatic environments, such as mud and stagnant water, though they are capable of surviving in the presence of air. A notable genus, Magnetospirillum, exhibits magnetotaxis. These bacteria contain internal chains of magnetite that allow them to orient themselves along the Earth's magnetic field lines, aiding their movement toward the sediment of ponds where they live. The discovery of similar magnetite structures in Martian meteorites has led to speculation about the possibility of ancient life on Mars.
