= Aerotaxis =

Aerotaxis is the movement caused by oxygen gradients. Positive aerotaxis involves the movement toward higher concentration of environmental oxygen, while negative aerotaxis involves the movement towards a lower concentration of environmental oxygen. Aerotactic bacteria gather around sources of air forming aerotactic bands.

== Discovery ==
The discovery of aerotaxis was first reported by Theodor Wilhelm Engelmann, as he showed microaerophilic Spirillum tenue were attracted by low oxygen concentrations. Ten decades after the first discovery of this movement, it was observed that bacteria are actually bound to areas with optimal oxygen concentrations; resulting in the formation of bands. It was concluded that the creations of these bands was largely in part to oxygen's important role in metabolic pathways as they allowed for surveying aerotaxis in many bacterial species. This ability proves to be important for survival as efficient metabolism directly relates to growth. Aerotaxis not only describes the response to energy source, but also the signal transductions across organisms to create ecosystems.

As growing conditions change, such as the availability of oxygen, bacteria capable of energy taxis travel towards nutrient concentrations which are metabolically beneficial. The direction of travel is determined utilizing a transducer, such as Aer or Tsr proteins in E. coli, which detect changes in either electron transport or proton motive force.

Aerotaxis, similar to other types of bacterial taxis, involves repeated cycles of straight-line swimming followed by short reversals that reorient bacteria so that they are constantly drawn up their oxygen gradients toward attractants and away from repellants. Aerotaxis is a dominant sensory system and will cause organisms to follow their oxygen gradient even if it makes them move against other chemical gradients.

== Visualization ==
Using Shewanella oneidensis, a Gram-negative facultative aerobic bacteria, as their model organism, a group of scientists looked to visualize the aerotactic bands formed by aerotactic bacteria. This bacterial strain is considered pivotal for sustainable technologies because of its ability to shift electrons from an electron donor towards an electron acceptor available in the environment like solid metals. By trapping an air bubble in-between a microscope slide and cover slip with the use of a spacer, the team was able to watch how the bacteria migrated to the air pocket over time. After about 20 minutes the bacteria started to aggregate around the air bubble and form a distinct band. The bacteria move in-between the bubble and the ring, and as time passes and air is used up, the ring shrinks towards the bubble.

Phase-contrast microscopy reveals a layer of bacteria piled up at the air–liquid interface and surrounded by a depletion zone after the air bubble has been used up. In the closed set up air supply is limited and used up so a layer of bacteria is unable to build. However, in an open set up with an unlimited air supply, a notable layer of bacteria continue to build at the air-liquid interface.
