= Magnetite =

Iron ore mineral

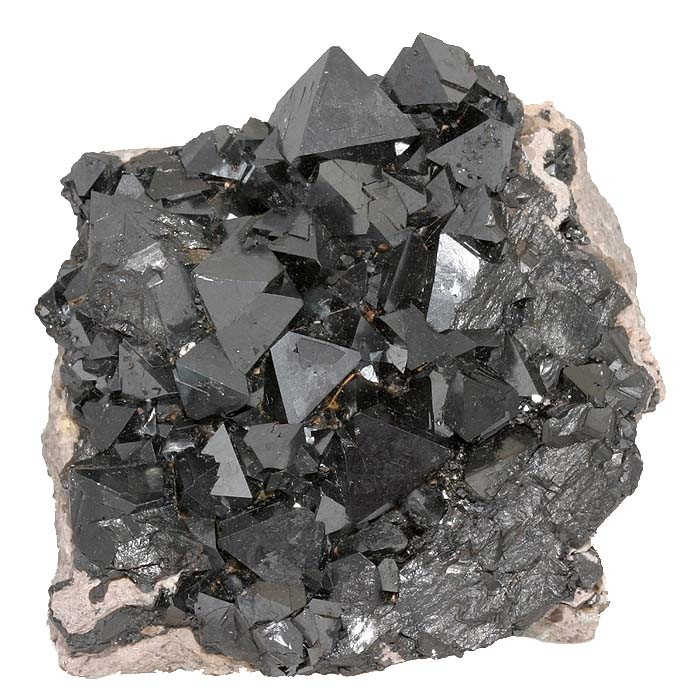
- Magnetite from Bolivia

General
- Category: Oxide minerals; Spinel group; Spinel structural group
- Formula: iron(II,III) oxide, Fe^{2+}Fe^{3+}_{2}O_{4}
- IMA symbol: Mag
- Strunz classification: 4.BB.05
- Crystal system: Isometric
- Crystal class: Hexoctahedral (m3̅m); H-M symbol: (4/m 3̅ 2/m)
- Space group: Fd3̅m (no. 227)
- Unit cell: a = 8.397 Å; Z = 8

Identification
- Color: Black, gray with brownish tint in reflected sun
- Crystal habit: Octahedral, fine granular to massive
- Twinning: On {Ill} as both twin and composition plane, the spinel law, as contact twins
- Cleavage: Indistinct, parting on {Ill}, very good
- Fracture: Uneven
- Tenacity: Brittle
- Mohs scale hardness: 5.5–6.5
- Luster: Metallic
- Streak: Black
- Diaphaneity: Opaque
- Specific gravity: 5.17–5.18
- Density: 5 g/cm^{3}
- Solubility: Dissolves slowly in hydrochloric acid

Major varieties
- Lodestone: Magnetic with definite north and south poles

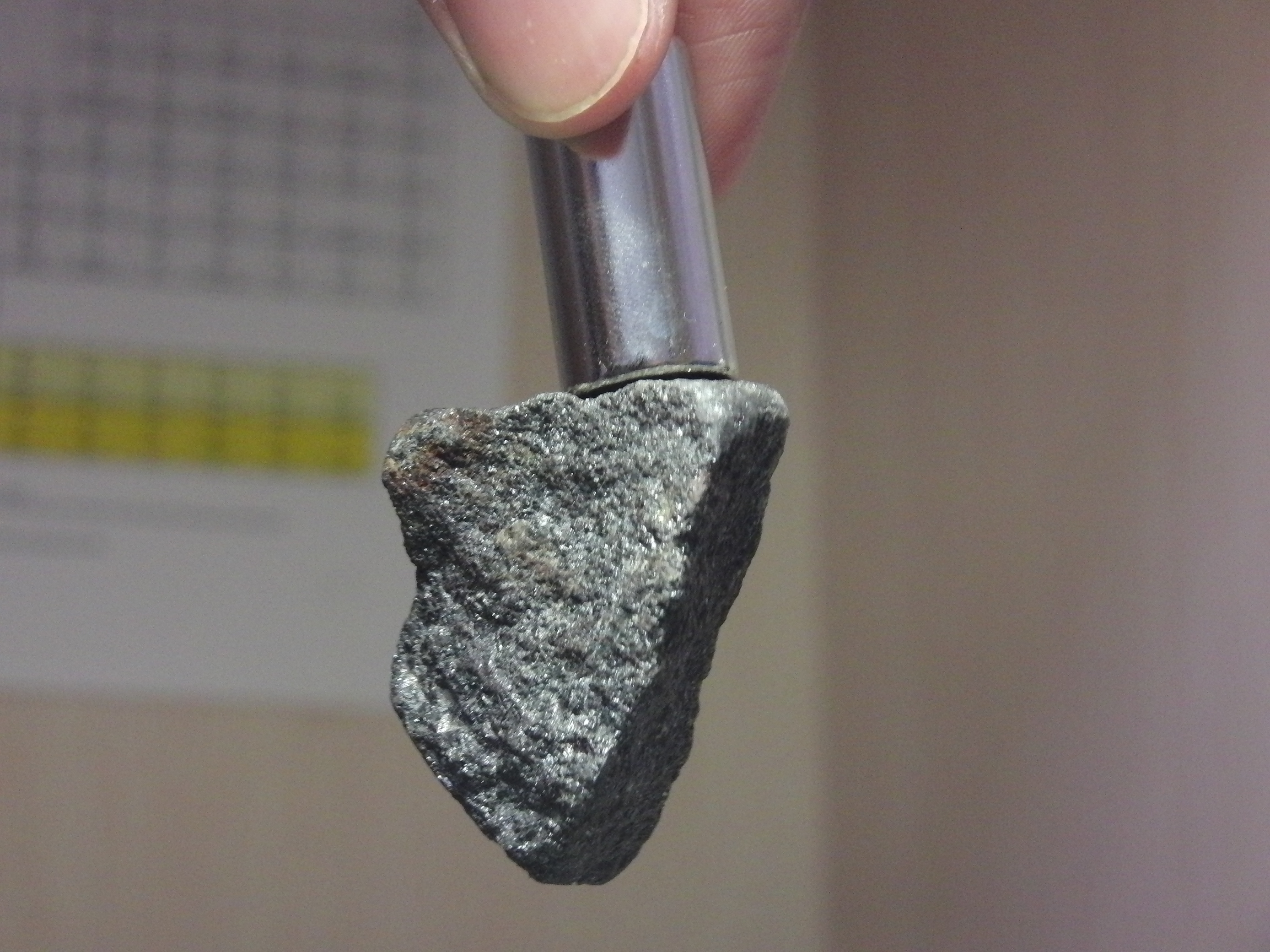
Magnetite is one of the very few minerals that is ferrimagnetic; it is attracted by a magnet as shown here

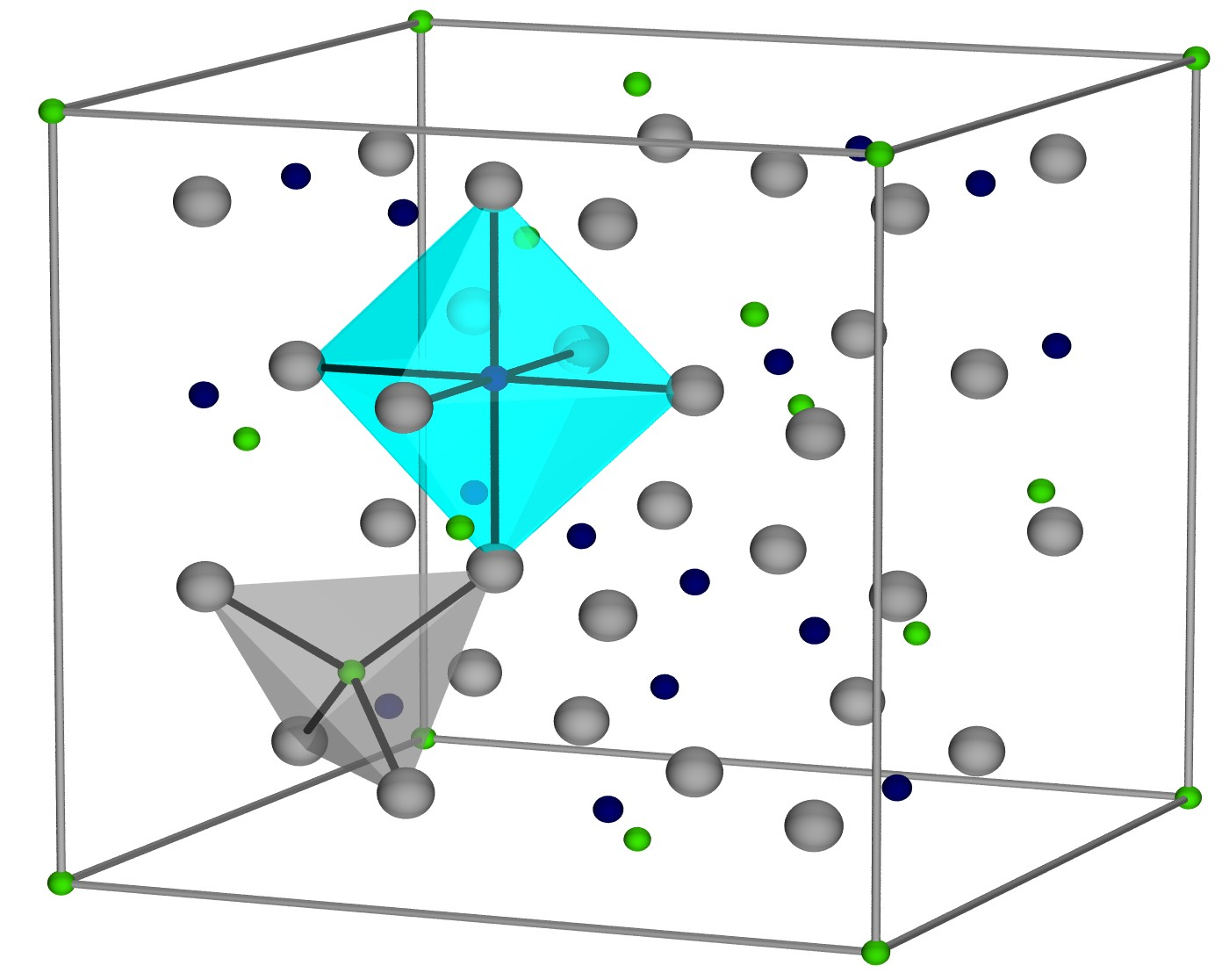
Unit cell of magnetite. The gray spheres are oxygen, green are divalent iron, blue are trivalent iron. Also shown are an iron atom in an octahedral space (light blue) and another in a tetrahedral space (gray).

Magnetite is a mineral and one of the main iron ores, with the chemical formula Fe^{2+}Fe^{3+}_{2}O_{4}. It is one of the oxides of iron, and is ferrimagnetic; it is attracted to a magnet and can be magnetized to become a permanent magnet itself. With the exception of extremely rare native iron deposits, it is the most magnetic of all the naturally occurring minerals on Earth. Naturally magnetized pieces of magnetite, called lodestone, will attract small pieces of iron, which is how ancient peoples first discovered the property of magnetism.

Magnetite is black or brownish-black with a metallic luster, has a Mohs hardness of 5–6 and leaves a black streak. Small grains of magnetite are very common in igneous and metamorphic rocks.

The chemical IUPAC name is iron(II,III) oxide and the common chemical name is ferrous-ferric oxide.

== Properties ==
In addition to igneous rocks, magnetite also occurs in sedimentary rocks, including banded iron formations and in lake and marine sediments as both detrital grains and as magnetofossils. Magnetite nanoparticles are also thought to form in soils, where they probably oxidize rapidly to maghemite.

=== Crystal structure ===
The chemical composition of magnetite is Fe^{2+}(Fe^{3+})_{2}(O^{2-})_{4}. This indicates that magnetite contains both ferrous (divalent) and ferric (trivalent) iron, suggesting crystallization in an environment containing intermediate levels of oxygen. The main details of its structure were established in 1915. It was one of the first crystal structures to be obtained using X-ray diffraction. It has an inverse spinel structure, with O^{2-} ions forming a face-centered cubic lattice and iron cations occupying interstitial sites. Half of the Fe^{3+} cations occupy tetrahedral sites while the other half, along with Fe^{2+} cations, occupy octahedral sites. The unit cell consists of thirty-two O^{2-} ions and unit cell length is a = 0.839 nm.

As a member of the inverse spinel group, magnetite can form solid solutions with similarly structured minerals, including ulvospinel (Fe_{2}TiO_{4}) and magnesioferrite (MgFe_{2}O_{4}).

Titanomagnetite, also known as titaniferous magnetite, is a solid solution between magnetite and ulvospinel that crystallizes in many mafic igneous rocks. Titanomagnetite may undergo oxy-exsolution during cooling, resulting in ingrowths of magnetite and ilmenite.

=== Crystal morphology and size ===
Natural and synthetic magnetite occurs most commonly as octahedral crystals bounded by {111} planes and as rhombic-dodecahedra. Twinning occurs on the {111} plane.

Hydrothermal synthesis usually produces single octahedral crystals which can be as large as 10 millimetres (3/8 inch) across. In the presence of mineralizers such as 0.1 M HI or 2 M NH_{4}Cl and at 0.207 MPa at 416–800 °C, magnetite grew as crystals whose shapes were a combination of rhombic-dodechahedra forms. The crystals were more rounded than usual. The appearance of higher forms was considered as a result from a decrease in the surface energies caused by the lower surface to volume ratio in the rounded crystals.

=== Reactions ===
Magnetite has been important in understanding the conditions under which rocks form. Magnetite reacts with oxygen to produce hematite, and the mineral pair forms a buffer that can control how oxidizing its environment is (the oxygen fugacity). This buffer is known as the hematite-magnetite or HM buffer. At lower oxygen levels, magnetite can form a buffer with quartz and fayalite known as the QFM buffer. At still lower oxygen levels, magnetite forms a buffer with wüstite known as the MW buffer. The QFM and MW buffers have been used extensively in laboratory experiments on rock chemistry. The QFM buffer, in particular, produces an oxygen fugacity close to that of most igneous rocks.

Commonly, igneous rocks contain solid solutions of both titanomagnetite and hemoilmenite or titanohematite. Compositions of the mineral pairs are used to calculate oxygen fugacity: a range of oxidizing conditions are found in magmas and the oxidation state helps to determine how the magmas might evolve by fractional crystallization. Magnetite also is produced from peridotites and dunites by serpentinization.

=== Magnetic properties ===
Lodestones were used as an early form of magnetic compass. Magnetite has been a critical tool in paleomagnetism, a science important in understanding plate tectonics and as historic data for magnetohydrodynamics and other scientific fields.

The relationships between magnetite and other iron oxide minerals such as ilmenite, hematite, and ulvospinel have been much studied; the reactions between these minerals and oxygen influence how and when magnetite preserves a record of the Earth's magnetic field.

At low temperatures, magnetite undergoes a crystal structure phase transition from a monoclinic structure to a cubic structure known as the Verwey transition. Optical studies show that this metal to insulator transition is sharp and occurs around 120 K. The Verwey transition is dependent on grain size, domain state, pressure, and the iron-oxygen stoichiometry. An isotropic point also occurs near the Verwey transition around 130 K, at which point the sign of the magnetocrystalline anisotropy constant changes from positive to negative. The Curie temperature of magnetite is 580 °C (853 K; 1,076 °F).

If magnetite is in a large enough quantity it can be found in aeromagnetic surveys using a magnetometer which measures magnetic intensities.

=== Melting point ===
Solid magnetite particles melt at about 1,583–1,597 °C (2,881–2,907 °F).

== Distribution of deposits ==
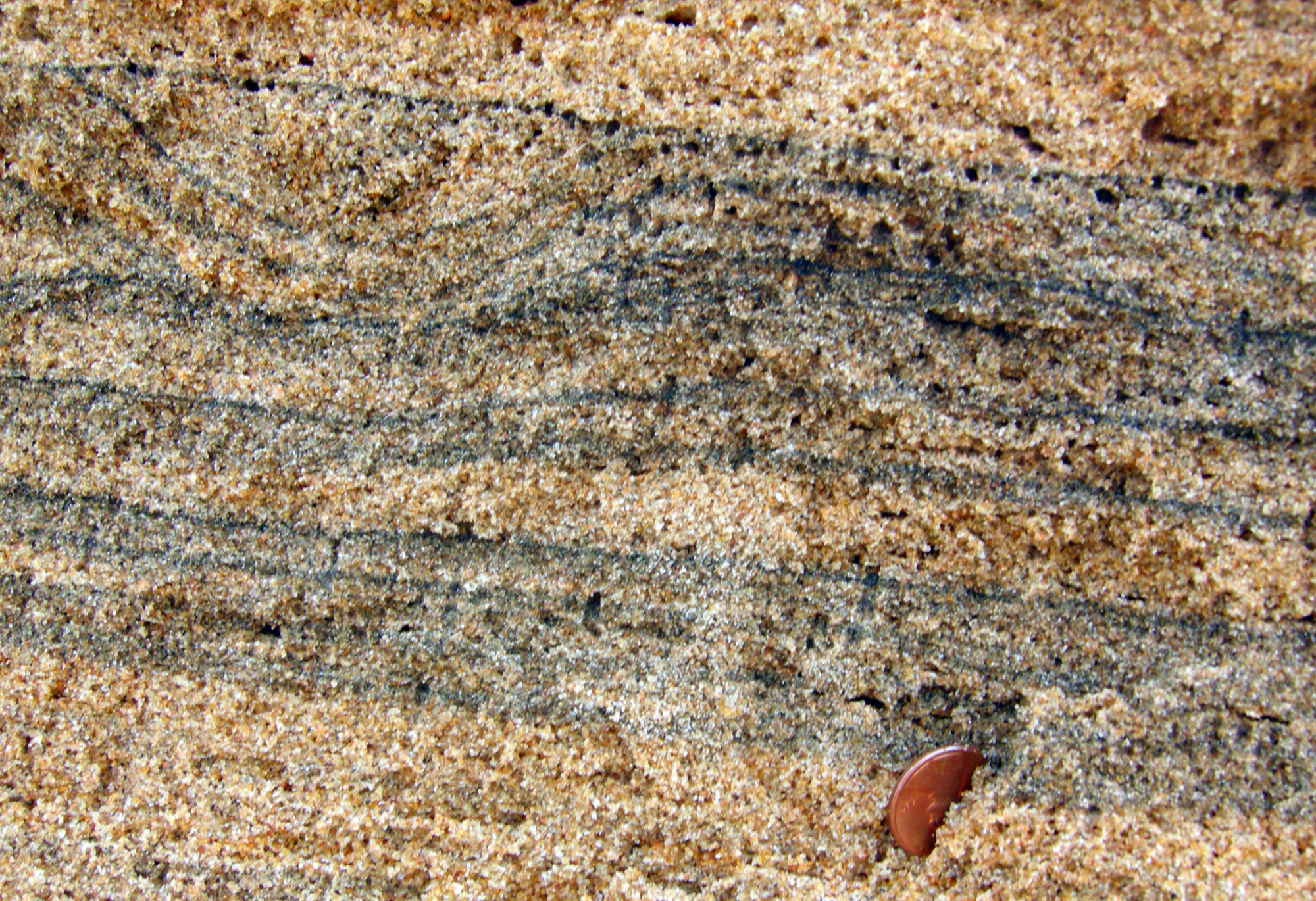
Magnetite and other heavy minerals (dark) in quartz beach sand (Chennai, India)

Magnetite is sometimes found in large quantities in beach sand. Such black sands (mineral sands or iron sands) are found in various places, such as Lung Kwu Tan in Hong Kong; California, United States; and the west coast of the North Island of New Zealand. The magnetite, eroded from rocks, is carried to the beach by rivers and concentrated by wave action and currents. Huge deposits have been found in banded iron formations. These sedimentary rocks have been used to infer changes in the oxygen content of the atmosphere of the Earth.

Large deposits of magnetite are also found in the Atacama region of Chile (Chilean Iron Belt); the Valentines region of Uruguay; Kiruna, Sweden; the Tallawang region of New South Wales; and in the Adirondack Mountains of New York in the United States. Kediet ej Jill, the highest mountain of Mauritania, is made entirely of the mineral. In the municipalities of Molinaseca, Albares, and Rabanal del Camino, in the province of León (Spain), there is a magnetite deposit in Ordovician terrain, considered one of the largest in Europe. It was exploited between 1955 and 1982. Deposits are also found in Norway, Romania, and Ukraine. Magnetite-rich sand dunes are found in southern Peru. In 2005, an exploration company, Cardero Resources, discovered a vast deposit of magnetite-bearing sand dunes in Peru. The dune field covers 250 square kilometers (100 sq mi), with the highest dune at over 2,000 meters (6,560 ft) above the desert floor. The sand contains 10% magnetite.

In large enough quantities magnetite can affect compass navigation. In Tasmania there are many areas with highly magnetized rocks that can greatly influence compasses. Extra steps and repeated observations are required when using a compass in Tasmania to keep navigation problems to the minimum.

Magnetite crystals with a cubic habit are rare but have been found at Balmat, St. Lawrence County, New York, and at Långban, Sweden. This habit may be a result of crystallization in the presence of cations such as zinc.

Magnetite can also be found in fossils due to biomineralization and are referred to as magnetofossils. There are also instances of magnetite with origins in space coming from meteorites.

== Biological occurrences ==
Biomagnetism is usually related to the presence of biogenic crystals of magnetite, which occur widely in organisms. These organisms range from magnetotactic bacteria (e.g., Magnetospirillum magnetotacticum) to animals, including humans, where magnetite crystals (and other magnetically sensitive compounds) are found in different organs, depending on the species. Biomagnetites account for the effects of weak magnetic fields on biological systems. There is also a chemical basis for cellular sensitivity to electric and magnetic fields (galvanotaxis).

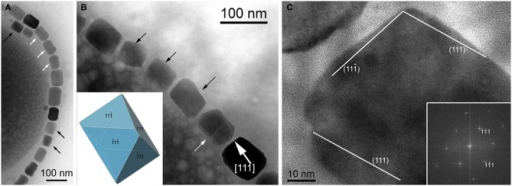
Magnetite magnetosomes in Gammaproteobacteria

Pure magnetite particles are biomineralized in magnetosomes, which are produced by several species of magnetotactic bacteria. Magnetosomes consist of long chains of oriented magnetite particles that are used by bacteria for navigation. After the death of these bacteria, the magnetite particles in magnetosomes may be preserved in sediments as magnetofossils. Some types of anaerobic bacteria that are not magnetotactic can also create magnetite in oxygen free sediments by reducing amorphic ferric oxide to magnetite.

Several species of birds are known to incorporate magnetite crystals in the upper beak for magnetoreception, which (in conjunction with cryptochromes in the retina) gives them the ability to sense the direction, polarity, and magnitude of the ambient magnetic field.

Chitons, a type of mollusk, have a tongue-like structure known as a radula, covered with magnetite-coated teeth, or denticles. The hardness of the magnetite helps in breaking down food.

Biological magnetite may store information about the magnetic fields the organism was exposed to, potentially allowing scientists to learn about the migration of the organism or about changes in the Earth's magnetic field over time.

=== Human brain ===
Living organisms can produce magnetite. In humans, magnetite can be found in various parts of the brain including the frontal, parietal, occipital, and temporal lobes, brainstem, cerebellum and basal ganglia. Iron can be found in three forms in the brain – magnetite, hemoglobin (blood) and ferritin (protein), and areas of the brain related to motor function generally contain more iron. Magnetite can be found in the hippocampus. The hippocampus is associated with information processing, specifically learning and memory. However, magnetite can have toxic effects due to its charge or magnetic nature and its involvement in oxidative stress or the production of free radicals. Research suggests that beta-amyloid plaques and tau proteins associated with neurodegenerative disease frequently occur after oxidative stress and the build-up of iron.

Some researchers also suggest that humans possess a magnetic sense, proposing that this could allow certain people to use magnetoreception for navigation. The role of magnetite in the brain is still not well understood, and there has been a general lag in applying more modern, interdisciplinary techniques to the study of biomagnetism.

Electron microscope scans of human brain-tissue samples are able to differentiate between magnetite produced by the body's own cells and magnetite absorbed from airborne pollution, the natural forms being jagged and crystalline, while magnetite pollution occurs as rounded nanoparticles. Potentially a human health hazard, airborne magnetite is a result of pollution (specifically combustion). These nanoparticles can travel to the brain via the olfactory nerve, increasing the concentration of magnetite in the brain. In some brain samples, the nanoparticle pollution outnumbers the natural particles by as much as 100:1, and such pollution-borne magnetite particles may be linked to abnormal neural deterioration. In one study, the characteristic nanoparticles were found in the brains of 37 people: 29 of these, aged 3 to 85, had lived and died in Mexico City, a significant air pollution hotspot. Some of the further eight, aged 62 to 92, from Manchester, England, had died with varying severities of neurodegenerative diseases. Such particles could conceivably contribute to diseases like Alzheimer's disease. Though a causal link has not yet been established, laboratory studies suggest that iron oxides such as magnetite are a component of protein plaques in the brain. Such plaques have been linked to Alzheimer's disease.

Increased iron levels, specifically magnetic iron, have been found in portions of the brain in Alzheimer's patients. Monitoring changes in iron concentrations may make it possible to detect the loss of neurons and the development of neurodegenerative diseases prior to the onset of symptoms due to the relationship between magnetite and ferritin. In tissue, magnetite and ferritin can produce small magnetic fields which will interact with magnetic resonance imaging (MRI) creating contrast. Huntington patients have not shown increased magnetite levels; however, high levels have been found in study mice.

== Applications ==
Due to its high iron content, magnetite has long been a major iron ore. It is reduced in blast furnaces to pig iron or sponge iron for conversion to steel.

=== Magnetic recording ===
Audio recording using magnetic acetate tape was developed in the 1930s. The German magnetophon first utilized magnetite powder that BASF coated onto cellulose acetate before soon switching to gamma ferric oxide for its superior morphology. Following World War II, 3M Company continued work on the German design. In 1946, the 3M researchers found they could also improve their own magnetite-based paper tape, which utilized powders of cubic crystals, by replacing the magnetite with needle-shaped particles of gamma ferric oxide (γ-Fe_{2}O_{3}).

=== Catalysis ===
Approximately 2–3% of the world's energy budget is allocated to the Haber Process for nitrogen fixation, which relies on magnetite-derived catalysts. The industrial catalyst is obtained from finely ground iron powder, which is usually obtained by reduction of high-purity magnetite. The pulverized iron metal is burnt (oxidized) to give magnetite or wüstite of a defined particle size. The magnetite (or wüstite) particles are then partially reduced, removing some of the oxygen in the process. The resulting catalyst particles consist of a core of magnetite, encased in a shell of wüstite, which in turn is surrounded by an outer shell of iron metal. The catalyst maintains most of its bulk volume during the reduction, resulting in a highly porous high-surface-area material, which enhances its effectiveness as a catalyst.

=== Magnetite nanoparticles ===
Magnetite micro- and nanoparticles are used in a variety of applications, from biomedical to environmental. One use is in water purification: in high gradient magnetic separation, magnetite nanoparticles introduced into contaminated water will bind to the suspended particles (solids, bacteria, or plankton, for example) and settle to the bottom of the fluid, allowing the contaminants to be removed and the magnetite particles to be recycled and reused. This method works with radioactive and carcinogenic particles as well, making it an important cleanup tool in the case of heavy metals introduced into water systems.

Another application of magnetic nanoparticles is in the creation of ferrofluids. These are used in several ways. Ferrofluids can be used for targeted drug delivery in the human body. The magnetization of the particles bound with drug molecules allows "magnetic dragging" of the solution to the desired area of the body. This would allow the treatment of only a small area of the body, rather than the body as a whole, and could be highly useful in cancer treatment, among other things. Ferrofluids are also used in magnetic resonance imaging (MRI) technology.

=== Coal mining industry ===
For the separation of coal from waste, dense medium baths are used. This technique employs the difference in densities between coal (1.3–1.4 tonnes per m^{3}) and shales (2.2–2.4 tonnes per m^{3}). In a medium with intermediate density (water with magnetite), stones sink and coal floats.

== Magnetene ==
Magnetene is a two-dimensional flat sheet of magnetite noted for its ultra-low-friction properties.

== Gallery ==
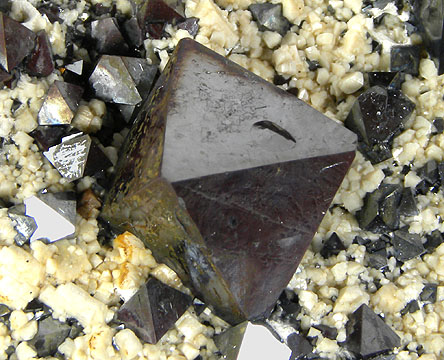
Octahedral crystals of magnetite up to 1.8 cm across, on cream colored feldspar crystals, locality: Cerro Huañaquino, Potosí Department, Bolivia

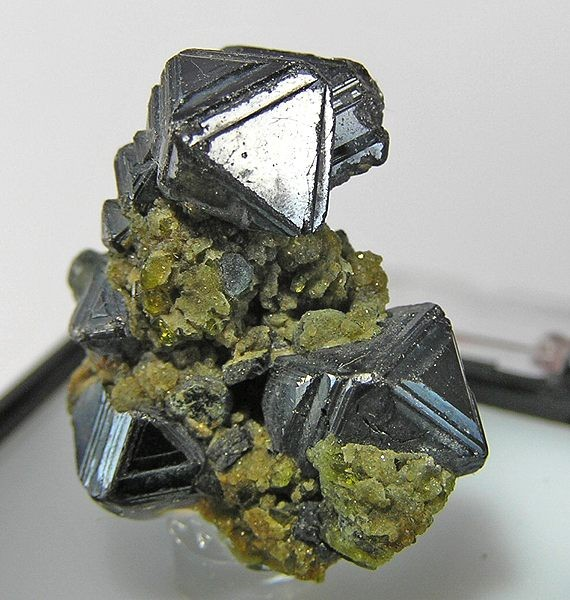
Magnetite crystals with epitaxial elevations on their faces

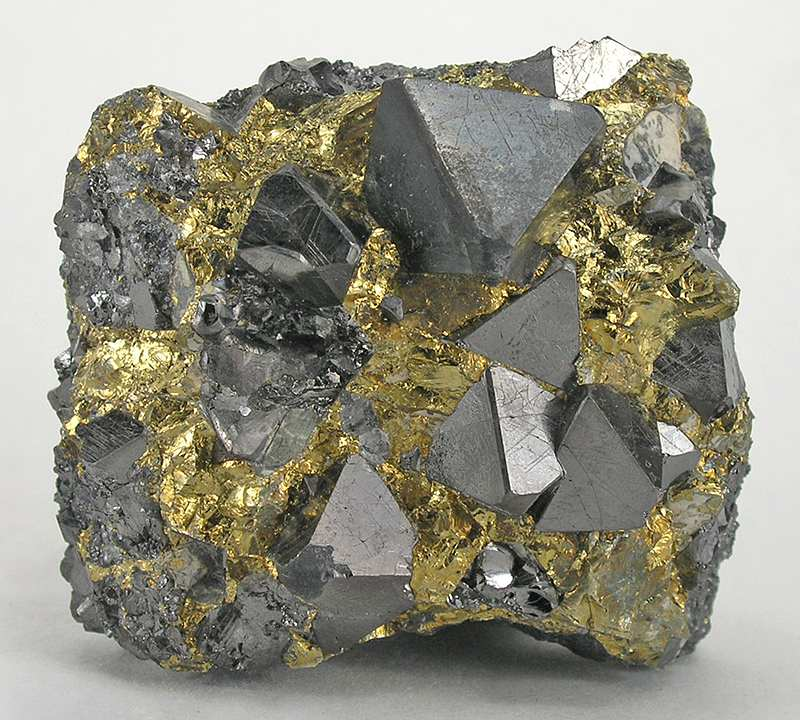
Magnetite in contrasting chalcopyrite matrix

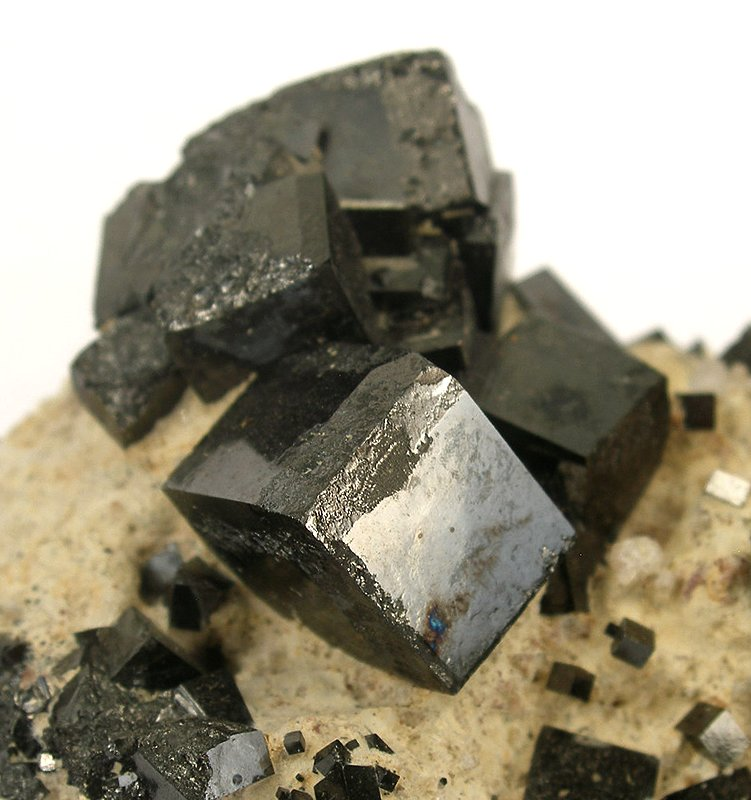
Magnetite with a rare cubic habit from St. Lawrence County, New York

== See also ==
- Bluing (steel), a process in which steel is partially protected against rust by a layer of magnetite
- Buena Vista Iron Ore District
- Corrosion product
- Ferrite
- Greigite
- Magnesia (in natural mixtures with magnetite)
- Mill scale
- Magnes the shepherd
- Rainbow lattice sunstone
