= Greigite =

Iron sulfide mineral of spinel structure

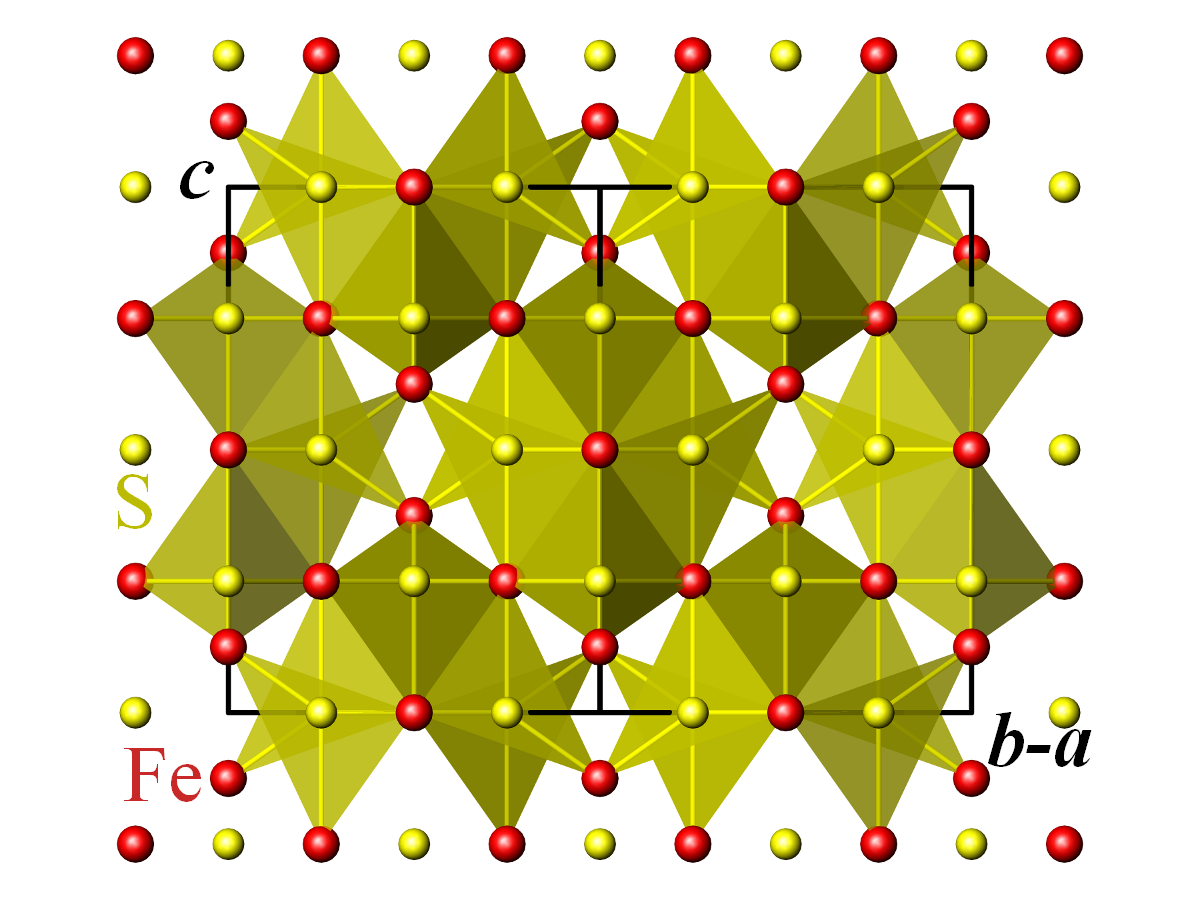
- Greigite structure, SFe_{4} tetrahedra

General
- Category: Sulfide mineral Thiospinel group Spinel structural group
- Formula: Fe^{2+}Fe^{3+}_{2}S_{4}
- IMA symbol: Grg
- Strunz classification: 2.DA.05
- Crystal system: Cubic
- Crystal class: Hexoctahedral (m3̅m); H-M symbol: (4/m 3̅ 2/m)
- Space group: Fd3̅m
- Unit cell: a = 9.876 Å; Z = 8

Identification
- Color: Pale pink, tarnishes to metallic blue-black
- Crystal habit: Spheres of intergrown octahedra and as disseminated microscopic grains
- Mohs scale hardness: 4 to 4.5
- Luster: Metallic to earthy
- Diaphaneity: Opaque
- Specific gravity: 4.049
- Other characteristics: Strongly magnetic

Greigite is an iron sulfide mineral with the chemical formula Fe^{2+}Fe^{3+}_{2}S_{4}. It is the sulfur equivalent of the iron oxide magnetite (Fe_{3}O_{4}). It was first described in 1964 for an occurrence in San Bernardino County, California, and named after the mineralogist and physical chemist Joseph W. Greig (1895–1977).

== Natural occurrence and composition ==
It occurs in lacustrine sediments with clays, silts and arkosic sand often in varved sulfide rich clays. It is also found in hydrothermal veins. Greigite is formed by magnetotactic bacteria and sulfate-reducing bacteria. Greigite has also been identified in the sclerites of scaly-foot gastropods.

The mineral typically appears as microscopic (< 0.03 mm) isometric hexoctahedral crystals and as minute sooty masses. Association minerals include montmorillonite, chlorite, calcite, colemanite, veatchite, sphalerite, pyrite, marcasite, galena and dolomite.

Common impurities include Cu, Ni, Zn, Mn, Cr, Sb and As. Ni impurities are of particular interest because the structural similarity between Ni-doped greigite and the (Fe,Ni)S clusters present in biological enzymes has led to suggestions that greigite or similar minerals could have acted as catalysts for the origin of life. In particular, the cubic Fe_{4}S_{4} unit of greigite is found in the Fe_{4}S_{4} thiocubane units of proteins of relevance to the acetyl-CoA pathway.

== Crystal structure ==
Greigite has the spinel structure. The crystallographic unit cell is cubic, with space group Fd3m. The S anions form a cubic close-packed lattice, and the Fe cations occupy both tetrahedral and octahedral sites.

== Magnetic and electronic properties ==
Like the related oxide magnetite (Fe_{3}O_{4}), greigite is ferrimagnetic, with the spin magnetic moments of the Fe cations in the tetrahedral sites oriented in the opposite direction as those in the octahedral sites, and a net magnetization. It is a mixed-valence compound, featuring both Fe(II) and Fe(III) centers in a 1:2 ratio. Both metal sites have high spin quantum numbers. The electronic structure of greigite is that of a half metal.

== On Mars ==
A September 10, 2025 paper published in Nature reported the "likely" detection of greigite and vivianite in the Jezero crater on Mars, by the Perseverance rover. It is considered a potential biosignature.
