= Mixed oxide =

Oxide compound with cations of multiple elements or different oxidation states

In chemistry, a mixed oxide is a somewhat informal name for an oxide that contains cations of more than one chemical element or cations of a single element in several states of oxidation.

The term is usually applied to solid ionic compounds that contain the oxide anion O^{2−} and two or more element cations. Typical examples are ilmenite (FeTiO_{3}), a mixed oxide of iron (Fe^{2+}) and titanium (Ti^{4+}) cations, perovskite and garnet.The cations may be the same element in different ionization states: a notable example is magnetite Fe_{3}O_{4}, which is also known as ferrosoferric oxide, contains the cations Fe^{2+} ("ferrous" iron) and Fe^{3+} ("ferric" iron) in 1:2 ratio. Other notable examples include red lead Pb_{3}O_{4}, the ferrites, and the yttrium aluminum garnet Y_{3}Al_{5}O_{12}, used in lasers.

The term is sometimes also applied to compounds of oxygen and two or more other elements, where some or all of the oxygen atoms are covalently bound into oxyanions. In sodium zincate Na_{2}ZnO_{2}, for example, the oxygens are bound to the zinc atoms forming zincate anions. (On the other hand, strontium titanate SrTiO_{3}, despite its name, contains Ti^{4+} cations and not the TiO^{2−}_{3} anion.)

Sometimes the term is applied loosely to solid solutions of metal oxides rather than chemical compounds, or to fine mixtures of two or more oxides.

Mixed oxide minerals are plentiful in nature. Synthetic mixed oxides are components of many ceramics with a range of properties and technological applications, such as magnets, optics, lasers, semiconductors, piezoelectrics, superconductors, catalysts, refractories, gas mantles, nuclear fuels, and more. Piezoelectric mixed oxides, in particular, are used in pressure and strain gauges, microphones, ultrasound transducers, micromanipulators, delay lines, etc.

== See also ==
- Complex oxide
- Double salt
- MOX fuel
