= Tetrahydroxozincate =

Ion

Identifiers
CAS Number	16408-25-6
3D model (JSmol)	Interactive image
PubChem CID	15820948
CompTox Dashboard (EPA)	DTXSID601336741
- InChI: InChI=1S/4H2O.Zn/h4*1H2;/q;;;;+2/p-4 Key: JOJHIPUJGCMGJM-UHFFFAOYSA-J
- SMILES: [OH-].[OH-].[OH-].[OH-].[Zn+2]

Properties
Chemical formula	H_{4}O_{4}Zn^{−2}
Molar mass	133.41 g·mol^{−1}
- Except where otherwise noted, data are given for materials in their standard state (at 25 °C [77 °F], 100 kPa). Infobox references

In chemistry, tetrahydroxozincate or tetrahydroxidozincate is a divalent anion (negative ion) with formula Zn(OH)^{2−}_{4}, with a central zinc atom in the +2 or (II) valence state coordinated to four hydroxide groups. It has Sp3 hybridization. It is the most common of the zincate anions, and is often called just zincate.

These names are also used for the salts containing that anion, such as sodium zincate Na_{2}Zn(OH)_{4} and calcium zincate CaZn(OH)_{4}·2H_{2}O

Zincate salts can be obtained by reaction of zinc oxide (ZnO) or zinc hydroxide (Zn(OH)_{2}) and a strong base like sodium hydroxide.

It is now generally accepted that the resulting solutions contain the tetrahydroxozincate ion. Earlier Raman studies had been interpreted as indicating the existence of linear ZnO^{2−}_{2} ions.

== Related anions and salts ==
The name "zincate" may also refer to a polymeric anion with formula approaching [Zn(OH)^{−}_{3}]_{n}, which forms salts such as NaZn(OH)_{3}·H_{2}O, or to mixed oxides of zinc and less electronegative elements, such as Na_{2}ZnO_{2}.

== See also ==
- tetrachlorozincate or tetrachloridozincate, ZnCl^{2−}_{4}
- tetranitratozincate, Zn(NO_{3})^{2−}_{4}
