= Redox gradient =

Variation of the redox potential with distance (or depth)

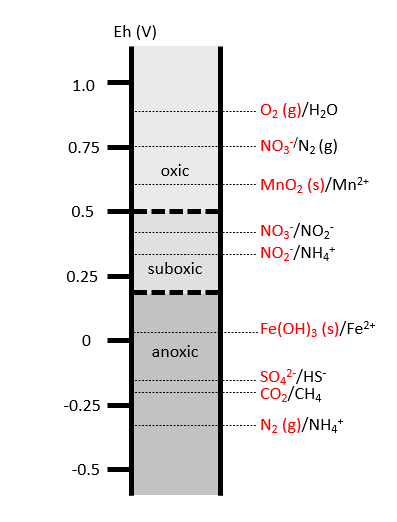
Depiction of common redox reactions in the environment. Adapted from figures by Zhang and Gorny. Redox pairs are listed with the oxidizer (electron acceptor) in red and the reducer (electron donator) in black.

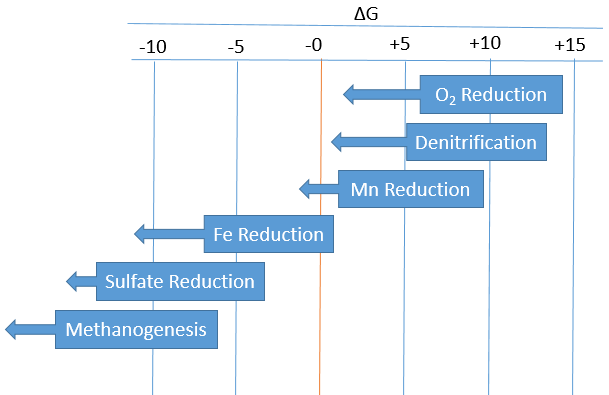
Relative favorability of redox reactions in marine sediments based on energy. Start points of arrows indicate energy associated with half-cell reaction. Lengths of arrows indicate an estimate of Gibb's free energy (ΔG) for the reaction where a higher ΔG is more energetically favorable (Adapted from Libes, 2011).

A redox gradient is a series of reduction-oxidation (redox) reactions sorted according to redox potential. The redox ladder displays the order in which redox reactions occur based on the free energy gained from redox pairs. These redox gradients form both spatially and temporally as a result of differences in microbial processes, chemical composition of the environment, and oxidative potential. Common environments where redox gradients exist are coastal marshes, lakes, contaminant plumes, and soils.

The Earth has a global redox gradient with an oxidizing environment at the surface and increasingly reducing conditions below the surface. Redox gradients are generally understood at the macro level, but characterization of redox reactions in heterogeneous environments at the micro-scale require further research and more sophisticated measurement techniques.

== Measuring redox conditions ==
Redox conditions are measured according to the redox potential (E_{h}) in volts, which represents the tendency for electrons to transfer from an electron donor to an electron acceptor. E_{h} can be calculated using half reactions and the Nernst equation. An E_{h} of zero represents the redox couple of the standard hydrogen electrode H^{+}/H_{2,} a positive E_{h} indicates an oxidizing environment (electrons will be accepted), and a negative E_{h} indicates a reducing environment (electrons will be donated). In a redox gradient, the most energetically favorable chemical reaction occurs at the "top" of the redox ladder and the least energetically favorable reaction occurs at the "bottom" of the ladder.

E_{h} can be measured by collecting samples in the field and performing analyses in the lab, or by inserting an electrode into the environment to collect in situ measurements. Typical environments to measure redox potential are in bodies of water, soils, and sediments, all of which can exhibit high levels of heterogeneity. Collecting a high number of samples can produce high spatial resolution, but at the cost of low temporal resolution since samples only reflect a singular a snapshot in time. In situ monitoring can provide high temporal resolution by collecting continuous real-time measurements, but low spatial resolution since the electrode is in a fixed location.

Redox properties can also be tracked with high spatial and temporal resolution through the use of induced-polarization imaging, however, further research is needed to fully understand contributions of redox species to polarization.

== Environmental conditions ==
Redox gradients are commonly found in the environment as functions of both space and time, particularly in soils and aquatic environments. Gradients are caused by varying physiochemical properties including availability of oxygen, soil hydrology, chemical species present, and microbial processes. Specific environments that are commonly characterized by redox gradients include waterlogged soils, wetlands, contaminant plumes, and marine pelagic and hemipelagic sediments.

The following is a list of common reactions that occur in the environment in order from oxidizing to reducing (organisms performing the reaction in parentheses):

1. Aerobic respiration (aerobes: aerobic organisms)
2. Denitrification (denitrifiers: denitrifying bacteria)
3. Manganese reduction (Manganese reducers)
4. Iron reduction (iron reducers: iron-reducing bacteria)
5. Sulfate reduction (sulfate reducers: Sulfur-reducing bacteria)
6. Methanogenesis (methanogens)

=== Aquatic environments ===
Redox gradients form in water columns and their sediments. Varying levels of oxygen (oxic, suboxic, hypoxic) within the water column alter redox chemistry and which redox reactions can occur. Development of oxygen minimum zones also contributes to formation of redox gradients.

Benthic sediments exhibit redox gradients produced by variations in mineral composition, organic matter availability, structure, and sorption dynamics. Limited transport of dissolved electrons through subsurface sediments, combined with varying pore sizes of sediments creates significant heterogeneity in benthic sediments. Oxygen availability in sediments determines which microbial respiration pathways can occur, resulting in a vertical stratification of redox processes as oxygen availability decreases with depth.

=== Terrestrial environments ===
Soil E_{h} is also largely a function of hydrological conditions. In the event of a flood, saturated soils can shift from oxic to anoxic, creating a reducing environment as anaerobic microbial processes dominate. Moreover, small anoxic hotspots may develop within soil pore spaces, creating reducing conditions. With time, the starting E_{h} of a soil can be restored as water drains and the soil dries out. Soils with redox gradients formed by ascending groundwater are classified as gleysols, while soils with gradients formed by stagnant water are classified as stagnosols and planosols.

Soil E_{h} generally ranges from −300 to +900 mV. The table below summarizes typical E_{h} values for various soil conditions:

Soil conditions	Typical E_{h} range (mV)
Waterlogged	E_{h} < +250
Aerated – moderately reduced	+100 < E_{h} < +400
Aerated – reduced	−100 < E_{h} < +100
Aerated – highly reduced	−300 < E_{h} < −100
Cultivated	+300 < E_{h} < +500

Generally accepted E_{h} limits that are tolerable by plants are +300 mV < E_{h} < +700 mV. 300 mV is the boundary value that separates aerobic from anaerobic conditions in wetland soils. Redox potential (E_{h}) is also closely tied to pH, and both have significant influence on the function of soil-plant-microorganism systems. The main source of electrons in soil is organic matter. Organic matter consumes oxygen as it decomposes, resulting in reducing soil conditions and lower E_{h}.

Examples of redox gradients in the environment
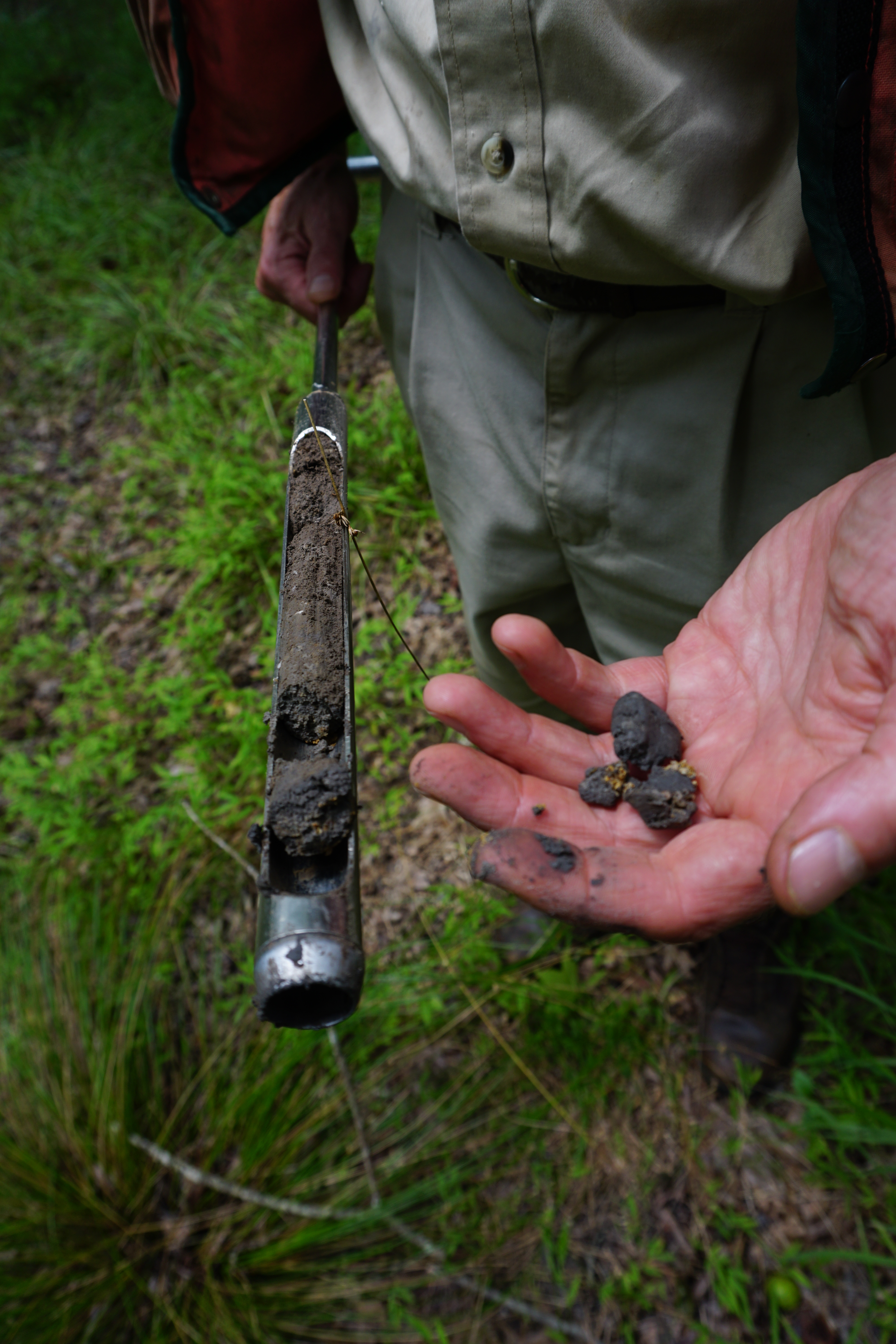
Wetland soils often experience redox gradients.

In productive ocean regions and enclosed basins, oxygen minimum zones and hypoxic zones may experience redox gradients in deep waters.

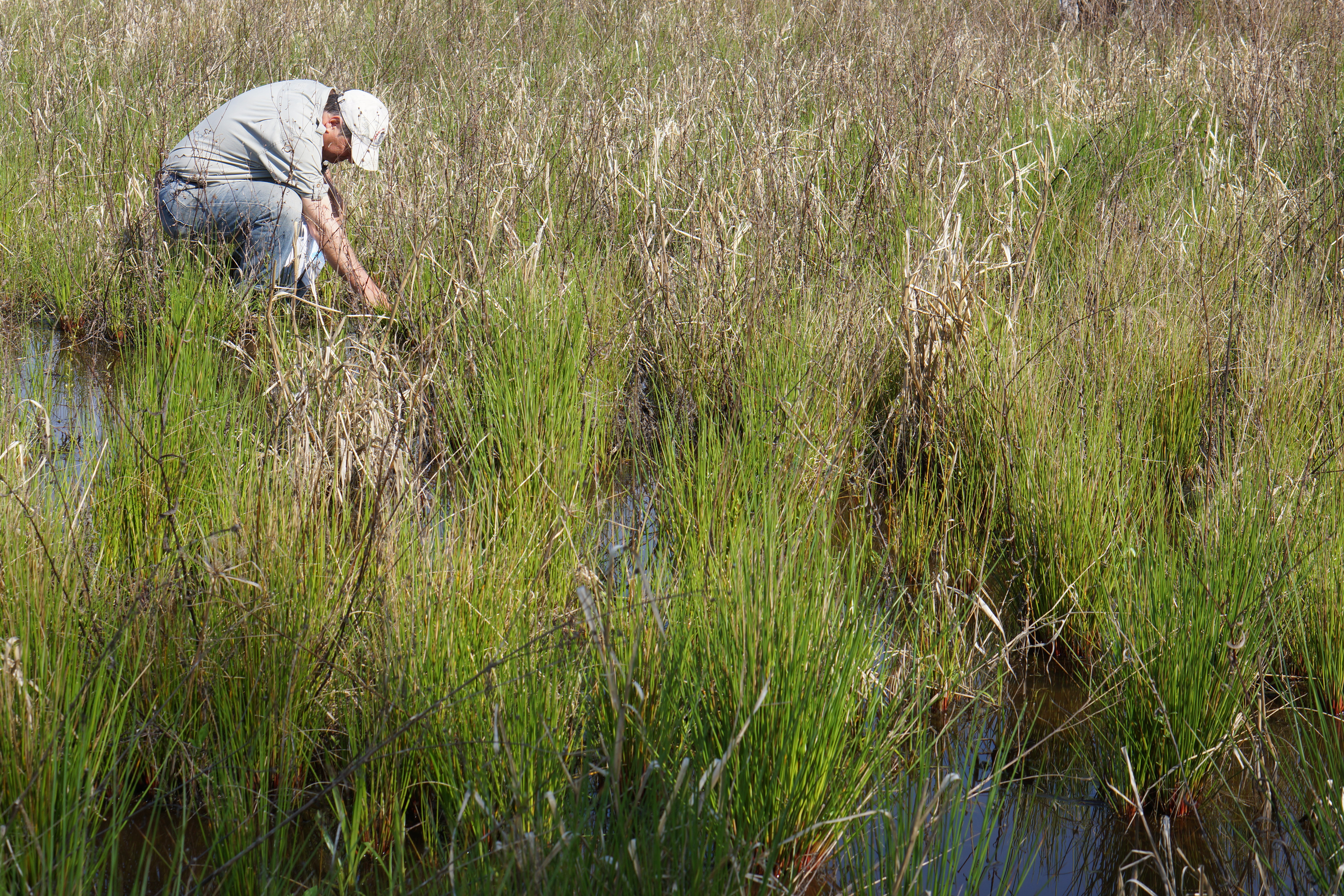
In wetlands, organic-rich soils accumulate over time, and these soils often experience redox gradients.

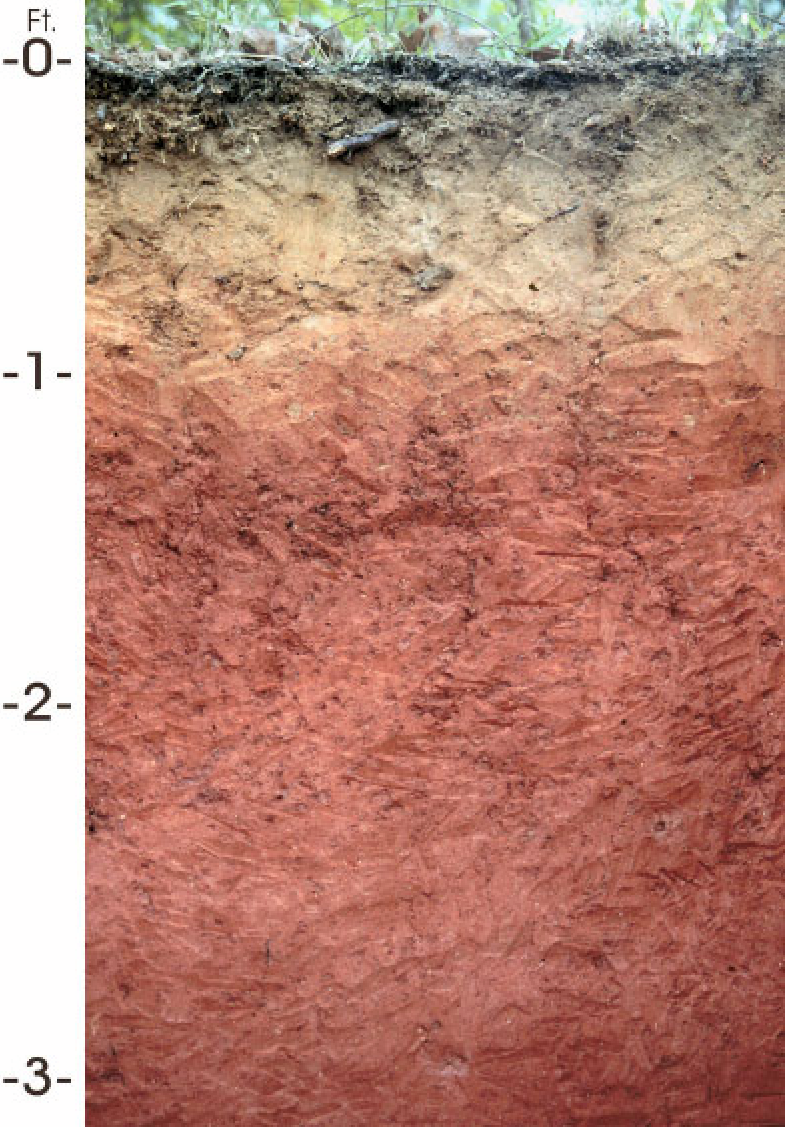
Some soils experience redox gradients.

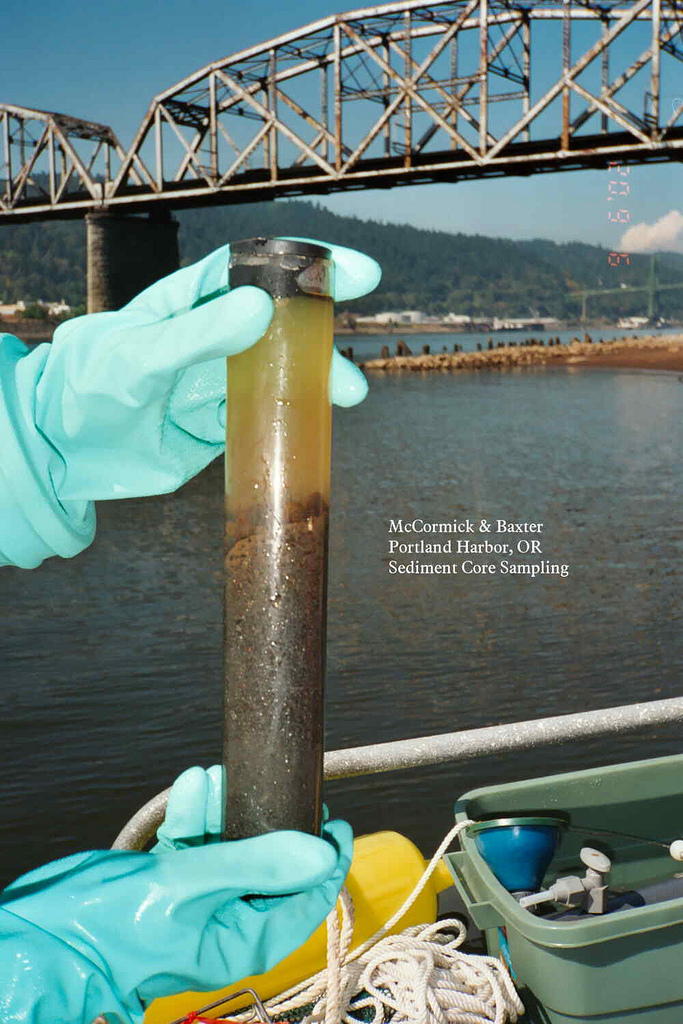
Sediment cores like this one collected from estuaries, rivers, lakes, and bays often have redox gradients with depth down into the core.

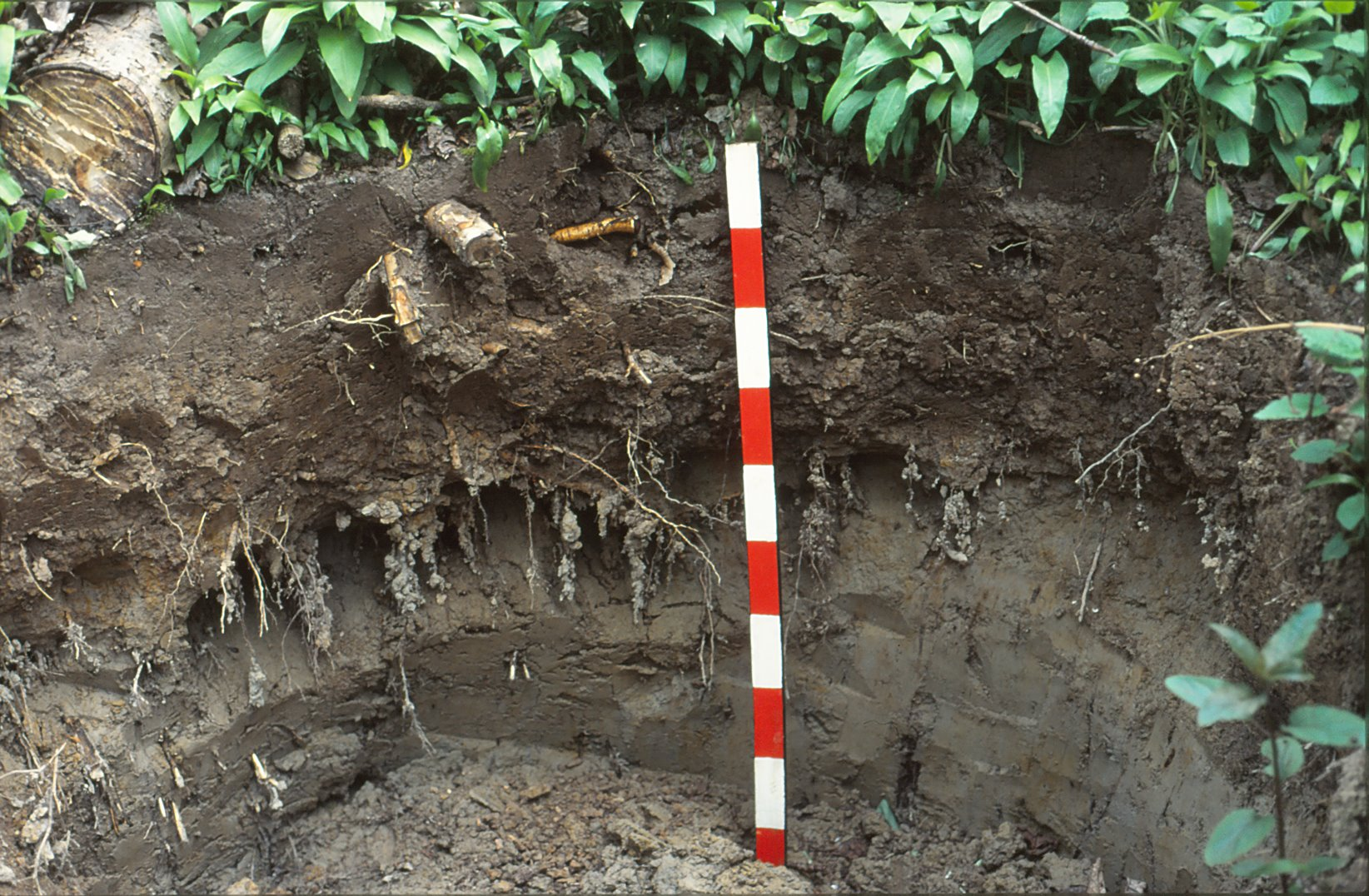
Gleysols or gley soils like this one in the Southern Black Forest in Germany often experience redox gradients.

== Role of microorganisms ==
Redox gradients form based on resource availability and physiochemical conditions (pH, salinity, temperature) and support stratified communities of microbes. Microbes carry out differing respiration processes (methanogenesis, sulfate reduction, etc.) based on the conditions around them and further amplify redox gradients present in the environment. However, distribution of microorganisms cannot solely be determined from thermodynamics (redox ladder), but is also influenced by ecological and physiological factors.

Redox gradients form along contaminant plumes, in both aquatic and terrestrial settings, as a function of the contaminant concentration and the impacts it has on relevant chemical processes and microbial communities. The highest rates of organic pollutant degradation along a redox gradient are found at the oxic-anoxic interface. In groundwater, this oxic-anoxic environment is referred to as the capillary fringe, where the water table meets soil and fills empty pores. Because this transition zone is both oxic and anoxic, electron acceptors and donors are in high abundance and there is a high level of microbial activity, leading to the highest rates of contaminant biodegradation.

Benthic sediments are heterogeneous in nature and subsequently exhibit redox gradients. Due to this heterogeneity, gradients of reducing and oxidizing chemical species do not always overlap enough to support electron transport needs of niche microbial communities. Cable bacteria have been characterized as sulfide-oxidizing bacteria that assist in connecting these areas of undersupplied and excess electrons to complete the electron transport for otherwise unavailable redox reactions.

Biofilms, found in tidal flats, glaciers, hydrothermal vents, and at the bottoms of aquatic environments, also exhibit redox gradients. The community of microbes—often metal- or sulfate-reducing bacteria—produces redox gradients on the micrometer scale as a function of spatial physiochemical variability.

See sulfate-methane transition zone for coverage of microbial processes in SMTZs.

== See also ==
- Anaerobic respiration
- Chemocline
- Gibbs free energy
- Dead zone (ecology)
- Hypoxia (environmental)
- Marine sediment
- Redox
- Redox potential
- Remineralization
- Sediment-water interface
- Sulfate-methane transition zone
