= Ken Buesseler =

American marine radiochemist

Kenneth Owen Buesseler
- Born: 1959 (age 66–67)
- Education: University of California, San Diego, Massachusetts Institute of Technology
- Known for: Research on marine radiation effects, Fukushima Daiichi nuclear disaster
- Scientific career
- Fields: Radiochemistry, Marine science
- Workplaces: Woods Hole Oceanographic Institution

Kenneth "Ken" Owen Buesseler (born 1959) is an American marine radiochemist. He is a senior scientist at the Woods Hole Oceanographic Institution.

== Education ==
Buesseler studied biochemistry and cell biology at the University of California, San Diego, where he obtained a BA in 1981. In 1986 he obtained his PhD from the Massachusetts Institute of Technology and the Woods Hole Oceanographic Institution.

== Career ==
Since 1983 he has spent the largest part of his career at the Woods Hole Oceanographic Institution, where he became a senior scientist in 2000. He is best known for his research on the marine radiation effects from the Fukushima Daiichi nuclear disaster, where he went on a scientific expedition shortly after the disaster. He has measured specific caesium levels since. He has also monitored the effects on the coast of the western United States. Buesseler has criticized the lack of a federal agency looking into the risks of marine radiation contamination in the United States. Buesseler previously did research on the effects of nuclear weapons testing and the effects of the Chernobyl disaster on the Black Sea.

== Honors and awards ==
Buesseler was elected a fellow of the American Geophysical Union in 2009. He was elected a foreign member of the Royal Netherlands Academy of Arts and Sciences in 2013. He was elected a Fellow of the American Association for the Advancement of Science in 2018. Buesseler was cited by the Times Higher Education as the top cited oceanographer for the decade 2000 to 2010.

== See also ==
- Fukushima 50
- Lists of nuclear disasters and radioactive incidents
- Claudia Benitez-Nelson
