= Zincate =

In chemistry the term zincate may refer to several substances containing the element zinc:

- usually the anion [Zn(OH)_{4}]^{2−}, more properly called tetrahydroxozincate or salts thereof, such as sodium zincate Na_{2}Zn(OH)_{4}.
- the polymeric anion [Zn(OH)_{3}]^{−} and its salts, for example NaZn(OH)_{3}·H_{2}O.
- an oxide containing zinc and a less electronegative element e.g. Na_{2}ZnO_{2}.

In the health supplement industry zincate may also mean a commercially available zinc supplement, typically formulated as zinc sulfate.

Solutions prepared from dissolving zinc hydroxide or zinc oxide in a strong alkali like sodium hydroxide, which contains various zincate anions, are used in the metal plating industry, in processes such as immersion zinc plating and electroplating (electrogalvanization). Any of these techniques may be called zincate process.

== Inorganic compound nomenclature ==
In the naming of inorganic compounds, "-zincate" is a suffix that indicates that a polyatomic anion contains a central zinc atom. Examples include tetrachlorozincate, ZnCl_{4}^{2−}, the tetrahydroxozincate, [Zn(OH)_{4}]^{2−} and tetranitratozincate, [Zn(NO_{3})_{4}]^{2−}. More recent recommendations (2005), that are not widely used, would call the first two ions tetrachloridozincate(2−) and tetrahydroxidozincate(2−) respectively.

== See also ==
- "-ate" complex
