= Zinc ammonium chloride =

Names
- IUPAC name diammonium tetrachlorozincate(2-)

Identifiers
CAS Number	14639-97-5
3D model (JSmol)	Interactive image
ChemSpider	55644
ECHA InfoCard	100.035.155
EC Number	238-687-6
PubChem CID	61754
UNII	NK9T00M5VV
UN number	1759
CompTox Dashboard (EPA)	DTXSID90892315 DTXSID6052164, DTXSID90892315
- InChI: InChI=1S/4ClH.2H3N.Zn/h4*1H;2*1H3;/q;;;;;;+2/p-2 Key: QOQUXKCHSZSKOT-UHFFFAOYSA-L
- SMILES: [NH4+].[NH4+].Cl[Zn-2](Cl)(Cl)Cl

Properties
Chemical formula	Cl_{4}H_{8}N_{2}Zn
Molar mass	243.26 g·mol^{−1}
Density	1.91 g/cm^{3}

Hazards
- GHS labelling
Pictograms	(GHS05: Corrosive) (GHS07: Exclamation mark) (GHS09: Environmental hazard)
Signal word	Danger
Hazard statements	H302, H314, H315, H400, H411
Precautionary statements	P260, P264, P270, P273, P280, P301+P312, P301+P330+P331, P302+P352, P303+P361+P353, P304+P340, P305+P351+P338, P310, P321, P330, P332+P313, P362, P363, P391, P405, P501
- Except where otherwise noted, data are given for materials in their standard state (at 25 °C [77 °F], 100 kPa). Infobox references

Zinc ammonium chloride is the inorganic compound with the formula (NH_{4})_{2}ZnCl_{4}. It is the ammonium salt of tetrachlorozincate. It used as a flux in the process of hot-dip galvanizing.

== Uses ==
Steel to be galvanized passes through an acidic cleaning process to remove iron oxide "mill scale". After this process, the surface of the steel is very active and oxide layers begin forming immediately upon exposure to the atmosphere.

Zinc ammonium chloride flux in aqueous solution is applied to the steel to reduce any oxides that are formed and/or inhibit them from forming altogether. This allows the molten zinc in the proceeding galvanizing step to maximally adhere to and alloy with the surface of the steel.

== See also ==
- Zinc antimonide
