= Immersion zinc plating =

Immersion zinc plating is an electroless (non-electrolytic) coating process that deposits a thin layer of zinc on a less electronegative metal, by immersion in a solution containing a zinc or zincate ions, Zn(OH)^{2−}_{4}. A typical use is plating aluminum with zinc prior to electrolytic or electroless nickel plating.

Immersion zinc plating involves the displacement of zinc from zincate by the underlying metal:

3 Zn(OH)^{2−}_{4} + 2 Al → 3 Zn + 2 Al(OH)^{−}_{4}+ 4 OH^{−}

== See also ==
- Electrogalvanization (electrolytic zinc coating)
- Immersion gold plating
- Immersion copper plating
- Immersion silver plating
