= Ashoverite =

General
- Category: Minerals
- Formula: Zn(OH)_{2}
- IMA symbol: Aov
- Strunz classification: 4.FA.10
- Dana classification: 6.2.11.1
- Crystal system: Tetragonal

Identification
- Color: Colourless, milky
- Cleavage: Perfect on {001}
- Luster: Vitreous, Dull
- Streak: White
- Diaphaneity: Translucent
- Specific gravity: 3.3
- Optical properties: Uniaxial (+)

Ashoverite is one of three polymorphs of zinc hydroxide, Zn(OH)_{2}. It is a rare mineral first found in a limestone quarry near Ashover, Derbyshire, England, in 1988. It has also been found in the Harz mountain range in Germany, and in Namibia.

The mineral was discovered after samples of the polymorph sweetite were sent to labs by S. A. Rust. Some specimens contained what appeared to be baryte but, which on further examination, were found to be a previously undescribed mineral.
