= Claudia Benitez-Nelson =

Chemical oceanographer and researcher

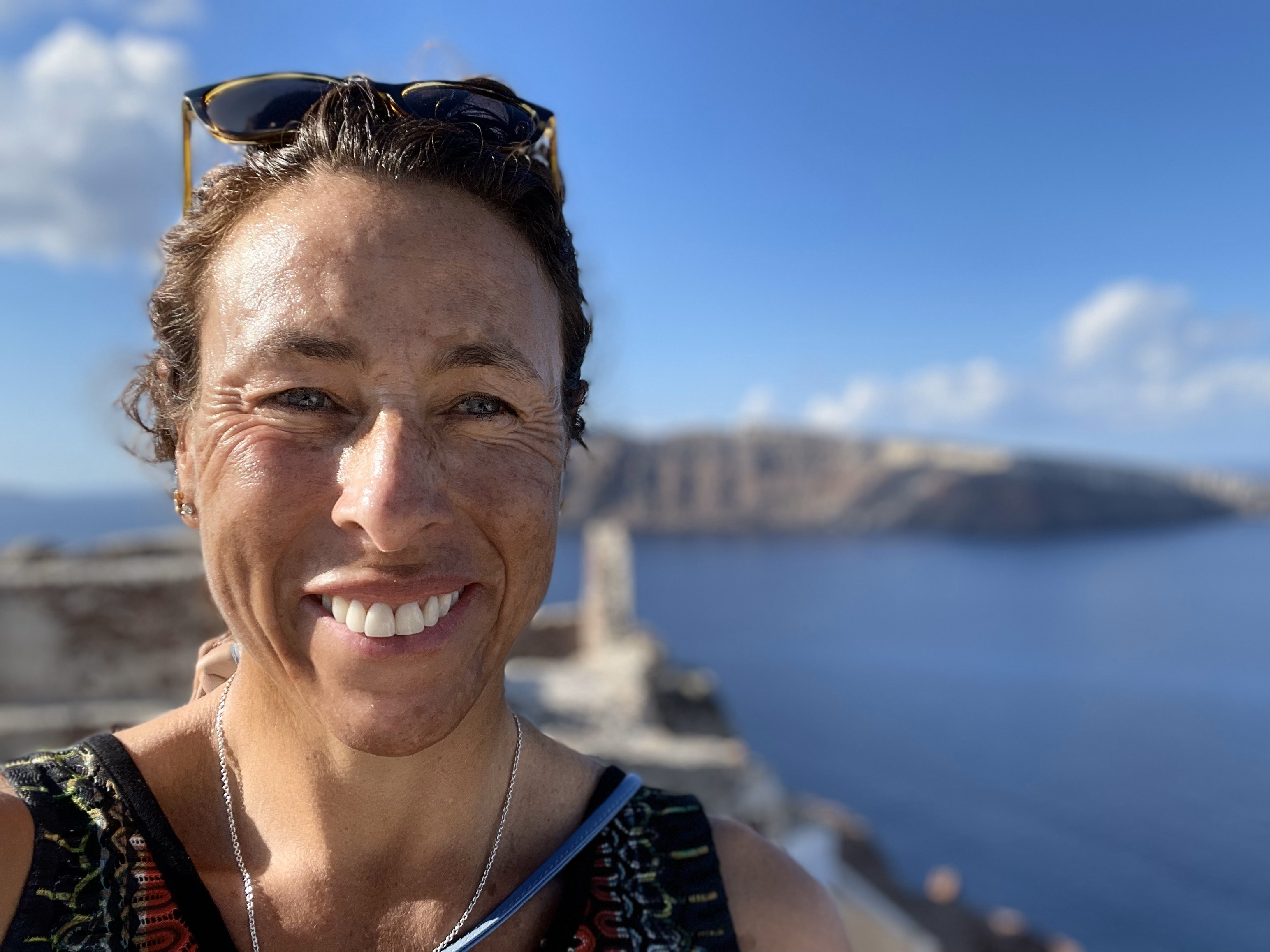
- Education: University of Washington, Massachusetts Institute of Technology/Woods Hole Oceanographic Institution Joint Program
- Known for: Oceanography Marine Geochemistry & Biogeochemistry Mentoring
- Awards: The Oceanography Society Mentoring Award, For Excellence and/or Innovation in Mentoring the Next Generation of Ocean Scientists (2021) American Association for the Advancement of Science (AAAS) Fellow (2015) Ocean Sciences Early Career Award, American Geophysical Union (AGU) (2006)

Claudia Benitez-Nelson is an American oceanographer whose research focuses on marine geochemistry and biogeochemistry. A Carolina Distinguished Professor, she serves as the Senior Associate Dean for College Initiatives and Interdisciplinary Programs at the University of South Carolina’s College of Arts and Sciences.

== Career and Research ==
Claudia Benitez-Nelson grew up in Seattle, Washington and attended the University of Washington, where she earned B.S. Degrees in Chemistry and Oceanography in 1992. She received her doctoral degree in Oceanography from the Massachusetts Institute of Technology/Woods Hole Oceanographic Institution Joint Program in 1999. Upon graduation, Benitez-Nelson was named a National Oceanic and Atmospheric Administration (NOAA)/University Corporation for Atmospheric Research (UCAR) Postdoctoral Fellow at the University of Hawaii as well as a School of Ocean and Earth Science and Technology (SOEST) Young Investigator. In 2002, Benitez-Nelson joined the University of South Carolina (USC). She earned tenure and promotion to Associate Professor in 2006 and was promoted to Full Professor in 2010. She is a Carolina Distinguished Professor and holds an Endowed Chair in Marine Studies. Benitez-Nelson served as the Undergraduate Director and then Director of USC's Marine Science Program, and then as Associate Dean and Senior Associate Dean in the McCausland College of Arts & Sciences.

Benitez-Nelson is highly regarded for her cross-disciplinary research, ranging from biogeochemistry to radiochemistry. Her research centers on the mechanisms that influence the formation, composition, and downward transport of material from the surface ocean to depth and from land to sea. This research directly relates to biological production and diversity and the ocean’s role in the uptake and sequestration of greenhouse gases, nutrients, toxins, and trace metals. She has been a leader in developing new techniques that use both novel chemical approaches (i.e., Benitez-Nelson et al, 2004; Diaz et al, 2008; Sekula-Wood et al, 2009; McParland et al., 2015) and sample collection methods with naturally occurring short-lived radionuclides (i.e., Benitez-Nelson and Buesseler, 1998; Benitez-Nelson et al., 2001; Buesseler et al. 2001; Benitez-Nelson and Moore, 2006 (and references therein); White et al., 2013). She has authored or coauthored more than 150 articles, which have been published in premier, high-impact journals such as PlosOne, Geophysical Research Letters, Nature and Science, and has been the principal investigator or co-principal investigator on substantial, multi-year research and education grants from the National Science Foundation (NSF) and the National Aeronautics and Space Administration (NASA), among others. Her research has received international acclaim and includes the Early Career Award in Oceanography from the American Geophysical Union (AGU), Fulbright and Marie Curie Fellowships, and being named National Academies of Science/Humboldt Foundation Kavli Fellow, an American Association for the Advancement of Science (AAAS) Fellow, a Sustaining Fellow of the Association for the Sciences of Limnology and Oceanography (ASLO), and a Fellow of the Oceanography Society. Her many professional service duties include serving as Chair of the International Scientific Committee on Oceanic Research (SCOR) Capacity Building Committee, Chair of the National Academy of Sciences Ocean Studies Board, and as an elected member of the AGU Ocean Sciences Section and ASLO Executive Committees. Along with being a part of those committees, she is also a member of ScienceMoms. Benitez-Nelson is also highly regarded as a teacher, receiving many teaching honors, including the Mungo Distinguished Professor Award, USC’s highest undergraduate teaching award.

== Awards and Honors ==
In 2021, she received The Oceanography Society’s inaugural Mentoring Award.

In 2020, receiving The Gold Telly Award.

Benitez-Nelson was an elected fellow for the American Association for the Advancement of Science (AAAS) and has been awarded the Ocean Sciences Early Career Award by the American Geophysical Union (AGU). Some of her other awards and honors include:

- Outstanding Educator Award, Association for Women Geoscientists, 2024
- Fellow, The Oceanography Society, 2024
- The Oceanography Society Mentoring Award, For Excellence and/or Innovation in Mentoring the Next Generation of Ocean Scientists, 2021
- Sustaining Fellow, Association for the Sciences of Limnology & Oceanography, 2017
- SEC Faculty Achievement Award, USC, 2016
- Ada B. Thomas Outstanding Faculty Advisor of the Year Award, UofSC, 2016
- Fellow, American Association for the Advancement of Science, 2015
- Sulzman Award for Excellence in Education and Mentoring, Biogeosciences Section, American Geophysical Union, 2014
- Mungo Distinguished Professor, USC, 2013
- National Academies of Science/Humboldt Foundation Kavli Fellow, 2012
- Faculty of the Year, National Award from the National Society of Collegiate Scholars (for outstanding undergraduate mentoring and leadership), 2005
- S. Carolina Alliance for Minority Participation (SCAMP) Outstanding Mentor, 2002
- Environmental Protection Agency STAR Graduate Fellowship, 1996–1998

== Selected publications ==
- McCabe, Kelly M.; Smith, Erik M.; Lang, Susan Q.; Osburn, Christopher L.; Benitez-Nelson, Claudia R. (19 January 2021). "Particulate and Dissolved Organic Matter in Stormwater Runoff Influences Oxygen Demand in Urbanized Headwater Catchments". Environmental Science & Technology. 55 (2): 952–961. Bibcode:2021EnST...55..952M. doi:10.1021/acs.est.0c04502. PMID 33405913. S2CID 230809983.
- Osborne, Emily B.; Thunell, Robert C.; Gruber, Nicolas; Feely, Richard A.; Benitez-Nelson, Claudia R. (January 2020). "Decadal variability in twentieth-century ocean acidification in the California Current Ecosystem". Nature Geoscience. 13 (1): 43–49. Bibcode:2020NatGe..13...43O. doi:10.1038/s41561-019-0499-z. S2CID 209381004.
- Umhau, Blaire; Benitez-Nelson, Claudia; Anderson, Clarissa; McCabe, Kelly; Burrell, Christopher (17 November 2018). "A Time Series of Water Column Distributions and Sinking Particle Flux of Pseudo-Nitzschia and Domoic Acid in the Santa Barbara Basin, California". Toxins. 10 (11): 480. doi:10.3390/toxins10110480. PMC 6265954. PMID 30453659.
- Humphries, Marc S.; Benitez-Nelson, Claudia R. (2013). "Recent trends in sediment and nutrient accumulation rates in coastal, freshwater Lake Sibaya, South Africa". Marine and Freshwater Research. 64 (11): 1087. Bibcode:2013MFRes..64.1087H. doi:10.1071/MF12313.
- Stukel, Michael R.; Landry, Michael R.; Ohman, Mark D.; Goericke, Ralf; Samo, Ty; Benitez-Nelson, Claudia R. (March 2012). "Do inverse ecosystem models accurately reconstruct plankton trophic flows? Comparing two solution methods using field data from the California Current". Journal of Marine Systems. 91 (1): 20–33. Bibcode:2012JMS....91...20S. doi:10.1016/j.jmarsys.2011.09.004. S2CID 32721478.
- Diaz, Julia; Ingall, Ellery; Benitez-Nelson, Claudia; Paterson, David; de Jonge, Martin D.; McNulty, Ian; Brandes, Jay A. (2 May 2008). "Marine Polyphosphate: A Key Player in Geologic Phosphorus Sequestration". Science. 320 (5876): 652–655. Bibcode:2008Sci...320..652D. doi:10.1126/science.1151751. PMID 18451299. S2CID 41092139.
- Benitez-Nelson, Claudia R.; Bidigare, Robert R.; Dickey, Tommy D.; Landry, Michael R.; Leonard, Carrie L.; Brown, Susan L.; Nencioli, Francesco; Rii, Yoshimi M.; Maiti, Kanchan; Becker, Jamie W.; Bibby, Thomas S.; Black, Wil; Cai, Wei-Jun; Carlson, Craig A.; Chen, Feizhou; Kuwahara, Victor S.; Mahaffey, Claire; McAndrew, Patricia M.; Quay, Paul D.; Rappé, Michael S.; Selph, Karen E.; Simmons, Melinda P.; Yang, Eun Jin (18 May 2007). "Mesoscale Eddies Drive Increased Silica Export in the Subtropical Pacific Ocean". Science. 316 (5827): 1017–1021. Bibcode:2007Sci...316.1017B. doi:10.1126/science.1136221. PMID 17510362. S2CID 24522740.
- Buesseler, K.O.; Benitez-Nelson, C.R.; Moran, S.B.; Burd, A.; Charette, M.; Cochran, J.K.; Coppola, L.; Fisher, N.S.; Fowler, S.W.; Gardner, W.D.; Guo, L.D.; Gustafsson, Ö.; Lamborg, C.; Masque, P.; Miquel, J.C.; Passow, U.; Santschi, P.H.; Savoye, N.; Stewart, G.; Trull, T. (August 2006). "An assessment of particulate organic carbon to thorium-234 ratios in the ocean and their impact on the application of 234Th as a POC flux proxy" (PDF). Marine Chemistry. 100 (3–4): 213–233. Bibcode:2006MarCh.100..213B. doi:10.1016/j.marchem.2005.10.013.
