= Sodium zincate =

Names
- IUPAC name sodium tetrahydroxozincate(II)

Identifiers
CAS Number	12179-14-5
3D model (JSmol)	Interactive image
ChemSpider	19990265
ECHA InfoCard	100.032.117
EC Number	235-3 ft42-1
PubChem CID	166652
CompTox Dashboard (EPA)	DTXSID70893224
- InChI: Key: HVTHJRMZXBWFNE-UHFFFAOYSA-J; InChI=1S/2Na.4H2O.Zn/h;;4*1H2;/q2*+1;;;;;+2/p-4
- SMILES: [OH-].[OH-].[OH-].[OH-].[Na+].[Na+].[Zn+2]

Properties
Chemical formula	Na_{2}[Zn(OH)_{4}]
Molar mass	179.418 g/mol

Hazards
- GHS labelling
Pictograms	(GHS05: Corrosive) (GHS09: Environmental hazard)
Signal word	Danger
Hazard statements	H314, H410
Precautionary statements	P260, P264, P273, P280, P301+P330+P331, P302+P361+P354, P304+P340, P305+P354+P338, P316, P321, P363, P391, P405, P501
- Except where otherwise noted, data are given for materials in their standard state (at 25 °C [77 °F], 100 kPa). verify (what is ?) Infobox references

Sodium zincate refers to anionic zinc oxides or hydroxides, depending on conditions. In the applications of these materials, the exact formula is not necessarily important and it is likely that aqueous zincate solutions consist of mixtures.

== Hydroxyzincates ==
Solutions of sodium zincate may be prepared by dissolving zinc, zinc hydroxide, or zinc oxide in an aqueous solution of sodium hydroxide. Simplified equations for these complex processes are:

ZnO + H_{2}O + 2 NaOH → Na_{2}Zn(OH)_{4}
Zn + 2 H_{2}O + 2 NaOH → Na_{2}Zn(OH)_{4} + H_{2}

From such solutions, one can crystallize salts of containing the anions Zn(OH)_{4}^{2−}, Zn_{2}(OH)_{6}^{2−}, and Zn(OH)_{6}^{4−}. Na_{2}Zn(OH)_{4} consists of tetrahedral zincate ion and octahedral sodium cations.
The salt Sr_{2}Zn(OH)_{6} features zinc in an octahedral coordination sphere.

== Oxozincates ==
Related oxides are also known such as Na_{2}ZnO_{2}, Na_{2}Zn_{2}O_{3}, Na_{10}Zn_{4}O_{9}.
