= Trace metal stable isotope biogeochemistry =

Trace metal stable isotope biogeochemistry is the study of the distribution and relative abundances of trace metal isotopes in order to better understand the biological, geological, and chemical processes occurring in an environment. Trace metals are elements such as iron, magnesium, copper, and zinc that occur at low levels in the environment. Trace metals are critically important in biology and are involved in many processes that allow organisms to grow and generate energy. In addition, trace metals are constituents of numerous rocks and minerals, thus serving as an important component of the geosphere. Both stable and radioactive isotopes of trace metals exist, but this article focuses on those that are stable. Isotopic variations of trace metals in samples are used as isotopic fingerprints to elucidate the processes occurring in an environment and answer questions relating to biology, geochemistry, and medicine.

== Isotope notation ==
In order to study trace metal stable isotope biogeochemistry, it is necessary to compare the relative abundances of isotopes of trace metals in a given biological, geological, or chemical pool to a standard (discussed individually for each isotope system below) and monitor how those relative abundances change as a result of various biogeochemical processes. Conventional notations used to mathematically describe isotope abundances, as exemplified here for ^{56}Fe, include the isotope ratio (^{56}R), fractional abundance (^{56}F) and delta notation (δ^{56}Fe). Furthermore, as different biogeochemical processes vary the relative abundances of the isotopes of a given trace metal, different reaction pools or substances will become enriched or depleted in specific isotopes. This partial separation of isotopes between different pools is termed isotope fractionation, and is mathematically described by fractionation factors α or ε (which express the difference in isotope ratio between two pools), or by "cap delta" (Δ; the difference between two δ values). For a more complete description of these notations, see the isotope notation section in Hydrogen isotope biogeochemistry.

== Naturally occurring trace metal isotope variations and fractionations ==
In nature, variations in isotopic ratios of trace metals on the order of a few tenths to several ‰ are observed within and across diverse environments spanning the geosphere, hydrosphere and biosphere. A complete understanding of all processes that fractionate trace metal isotopes is presently lacking, but in general, isotopes of trace metals are fractionated during various chemical and biological processes due to kinetic and equilibrium isotope effects.

=== Geochemical fractionations ===
Certain isotopes of trace metals are preferentially oxidized or reduced; thus, transitions between redox species of the metal ions (e.g., Fe^{2+} → Fe^{3+}) are fractionating, resulting in different isotopic compositions between the different redox pools in the environment. Additionally, at high temperatures, metals ions can evaporate (and subsequently condense upon cooling), and the relative differences in isotope masses of a given heavy metal leads to fractionation during these evaporation and condensation processes. Diffusion of isotopes through a solution or material can also result in fractionations, as the lighter mass isotopes are able to diffuse at a faster rate. Additionally, isotopes can have slight variations in their solubility and other chemical and physical properties, which can also drive fractionation.

=== Biological fractionations ===
In sediments, oceans, and rivers, distinct trace metal isotope ratios exist due to biological processes such as metal ion uptake and abiotic processes such as adsorption to particulate matter that preferentially remove certain isotopes. The trace metal isotopic composition of a given organism results from a combination of the isotopic compositions of source material (i.e., food and water) and any fractionations imparted during metal ion uptake, translocation and processing inside cells.

== Applications of trace metal isotope ratios ==
Stable isotope ratios of trace metals can be used to answer a variety of questions spanning diverse fields, including oceanography, geochemistry, biology, medicine, anthropology and astronomy. In addition to their modern applications, trace metal isotopic compositions can provide insight into ancient biogeochemical processes operated on Earth. These signatures arise because the processes that form and modify samples are recorded in the trace metal isotopic compositions of the samples. By analyzing and understanding trace metal isotopic compositions in biological, chemical or geological materials, one can answer questions such as the sources of nutrients for phytoplankton in the ocean, processes that drove the formation of geologic structures, the diets of modern or ancient organisms, and accretionary processes that took place in the early Solar System. Trace metal stable isotope biogeochemistry is still an emerging field, yet each trace metal isotope system has clear, powerful applications to diverse and important questions. Important heavy metal isotope systems are discussed (in order of increasing atomic mass) in the proceeding sections.

== Iron ==
=== Stable isotopes and natural abundances ===
Naturally occurring iron has four stable isotopes, ^{54}Fe, ^{56}Fe, ^{57}Fe, and ^{58}Fe.

Stable isotopes of iron
Isotope	Abundance (%)
^{54}Fe	5.845
^{56}Fe	91.754
^{57}Fe	2.1191
^{58}Fe	0.2819

Stable iron isotopes are described as the relative abundance of each of the stable isotopes with respect to ^{54}Fe. The standard for iron is elemental iron, IRMM-014, and it is distributed by the Institute for Reference Materials and Measurement. The delta value is compared to this standard, and is defined as:

$\delta^{56/54}Fe = \frac{(^{56}Fe/^{54}Fe)_{sample}}{(^{56}Fe/^{54}Fe)_{IRMM014}} -1$

Delta values are often reported as per mil values (‰), or part-per-thousand differences from the standard. Iron isotopic fractionation is also commonly described in units of per mil per atomic mass unit.

In many cases, the δ^{56}Fe value can be related to the δ^{57}Fe and δ^{58}Fe values through mass-dependent fractionation:

$\delta^{57}Fe =1.5 \times \delta^{56}Fe$

$\delta^{58}Fe=2 \times \delta^{56}Fe$

=== Chemistry ===
One of the most prevalent features of iron chemistry is its redox chemistry. Iron has three oxidation states: metallic iron (Fe^{0}), ferrous iron (Fe^{2+}), and ferric iron (Fe^{3+}). Ferrous iron is the reduced form of iron, and ferric iron is the oxidized form of iron. In the presence of oxygen, ferrous iron is oxidized to ferric iron, thus ferric iron is the dominant redox state of iron at Earth's surface conditions. However, ferrous iron is the dominant redox state below the surface at depth. Because of this redox chemistry, iron can act as either an electron donor or receptor, making it a metabolically useful species.

Each form of iron has a specific distribution of electrons (i.e., electron configuration), tabulated below:

Electron configurations of Fe
Fe form	Electron configuration
Fe^{0}	[Ar]3d^{6}4s^{2}
Fe^{2+}	[Ar]3d^{6}
Fe^{3+}	[Ar]3d^{5}

=== Equilibrium Isotope Fractionation ===
Variations in iron isotopes are caused by a number of chemical processes which result in the preferential incorporation of certain isotopes of iron into certain phases. Many of the chemical processes which fractionate iron are not well understood and are still being studied. The most well-documented chemical processes which fractionate iron isotopes relate to its redox chemistry, the evaporation and condensation of iron, and the diffusion of dissolved iron through systems. These processes are described in more detail below.

==== Fractionation as a result of redox chemistry ====
To first order, reduced iron favors isotopically light iron and oxidized iron favors isotopically heavy iron. This effect has been studied in regards to the abiotic oxidation of Fe^{2+} to Fe^{3+}, which results in fractionation. The mineral ferrihydrite, which forms in acidic aquatic conditions, is precipitated via the oxidation of aqueous Fe^{2+} to Fe^{3+}. Precipitated ferrihydrite has been found to be enriched in the heavy isotopes by 0.45‰ per atomic mass unit with respect to the starting material. This indicates that heavier iron isotopes are preferentially precipitated as a result of oxidizing processes.

Theoretical calculations in combination with experimental data have also aimed to quantify the fractionation between Fe(III)_{aq} and Fe(II)_{aq} in HCl. Based on modeling, the fractionation factor between the two species is temperature dependent:

$10^3\times\ln{\alpha_{Fe(III)-Fe(II)}}=\frac{0.334\pm0.032\times10^6}{T^2}-0.66\pm0.38$

==== Fractionation as a result of evaporation and condensation ====
Evaporation and condensation can give rise to both kinetic and equilibrium isotope effects. While equilibrium mass fractionation is present evaporation and condensation, it is negligible compared to kinetic effects. During condensation, the condensate is enriched in the light isotope, whereas in evaporation, the gas phase is enriched in the light isotope. Using the kinetic theory of gases, for ^{56}Fe/^{54}Fe, a fractionation factor of α = 1.01835 for the evaporation of a pool containing equimolar amounts of ^{56}Fe and ^{54}Fe. In evaporation experiments, the evaporation of FeO at 1,823 K gave a fractionation factor of α = 1.01877. Presently, there have been no experimental attempts to determine the ^{56}Fe/^{54}Fe fractionation factor of condensation.

==== Fractionation as a result of diffusion ====
Kinetic fractionation of dissolved iron occurs as a result of diffusion. When isotopes diffuse, the lower mass isotopes diffuse more quickly than the heavier isotopes, resulting in fractionation. This difference in diffusion rates has been approximated as:

$\frac{D_1}{D_2}=\left ( \frac{m_1}{m_2} \right )^\beta$

In this equation, D_{1} and D_{2} are the diffusivities of the isotopes, m_{1} and m_{2} are the masses of the isotopes, and β, which can vary between 0 and 0.5, depending on the system. More work is required to fully understand fractionation as a result of diffusion, studies of diffusion of iron on metal have consistently given β values of approximately 0.25. Iron diffusion between silicate melts and basaltic/rhyolitic melts have given lower β values (~0.030). In aqueous environments, a β value of 0.0025 has been obtained.

==== Fractionation as a result of phase partitioning ====
There may be equilibrium fractionation between coexisting minerals. This would be particularly relevant when considering the formation of planetary bodies early in the Solar System. Experiments have aimed to simulate the formation of the Earth at high temperatures using a platinum-iron alloy and an analog for the silicate earth at 1,500 °C. However, the observed fractionation was very small, less than 0.2‰ per atomic mass unit. More experimental work is needed to fully understand this effect.

=== Biology ===
In biology, iron plays a number of roles. Iron is widespread in most living organisms and is essential for their function. In microbes, iron redox chemistry is utilized as an electron donor or receptor in microbial metabolism, allowing microbes to generate energy. In the oceans, iron is essential for the growth and survival of phytoplankton, which use iron to fix nitrogen. Iron is also important in plants, given that they need iron to transfer electrons during photosynthesis. Finally, in animals, iron plays many roles, however, its most essential function is to transport oxygen in the bloodstream throughout the body. Thus, iron undergoes many biological processes, each of which have variations in which isotopes of iron they preferentially use. While iron isotopic fractionations are observed in many organisms, they are still not well understood. Improvements in the understanding the iron isotope fractionations observed in biology will enable the development of a more complete knowledge of the enzymatic, metabolic, and other biologic pathways in different organisms. Below, the known iron isotopic variations for different classes of organisms are described.

==== Iron reducing bacteria ====
Iron reducing bacteria reduce ferric iron to ferrous iron under anaerobic conditions. One of the first studies that studied iron fractionation in iron-reducing bacteria studied the bacterium Shewanella algae. S. algae was grown on a ferrihydrite substrate, and was then allowed to reduce iron. The study found that S. algae preferentially reduced ^{54}Fe over ^{56}Fe, with a δ^{56/54}Fe value of -1.3‰.

More recent experiments have studied the bacterium Shewanella putrefaciens and its reduction of Fe(III) in goethite. These studies have found δ^{56/54}Fe values of -1.2‰ relative to the goethite. The kinetics of this fractionation were also studied in this experiment, and it was suggested that the iron isotope fractionation is likely related to the kinetics of the electron transfer step.

Most studies of other iron reducing bacteria have found δ^{56/54}Fe values of approximately -1.3‰. At high Fe(III) reduction rates, δ^{56/54}Fe values of -2 – -3‰ relative to the substrate have been observed. The study of iron isotopes in iron reducing bacteria enable the development of an improved understanding regarding the metabolic processes operating in these organisms.

Isotope fractionations resulting from iron reducing bacteria
Species	δ^{54/56}Fe (‰)	Reference
Fe(II)_{aq} - FeCO_{3}	0.0	
Fe(II)_{aq} - Ca_{0.15}Fe_{0.85}CO_{3}	+0.9	
Fe(II)_{aq} - Fe_{3}O_{4}	-1.3	
Fe(II)_{aq} - Ferric oxide/hydroxide	-1.3	
Fe(II)_{aq} - Fe(II)_{s}	0.0	
Fe_{3}O_{4} - FeCO_{3}	+1.3	
Fe_{3}O_{4} - Ca_{0.15}Fe_{0.85}CO_{3}	+2.2	

==== Iron oxidizing bacteria ====
While most iron is oxidized as a result of interaction with atmospheric oxygen or oxygenated waters, oxidation by bacteria is an active process in anoxic environments and in oxygenated, low pH (<3) environments. Studies of the acidophilic Fe(II)-oxidizing bacterium, Acidthiobacillus ferrooxidans, have been used to determine the fractionation as a result of iron-oxidizing bacteria. In most cases, δ^{56/54}Fe values between 2 and 3‰ were measured. However, a Rayleigh trend with a fractionation factor of α_{Fe(III)aq-Fe(II)aq} ~ 1.0022 was observed, which is smaller than the fractionation factor in the abiotic control experiments (α_{Fe(III)aq-Fe(II)aq} ~ 1.0034), which has been inferred to reflect a biological isotope effect. Using iron isotopes, an improvement in the understanding of the metabolic processes controlling iron oxidation and energy production in these organisms can be developed.

Photoautrophic bacteria, which oxidize Fe(II) under anaerobic conditions, have also been studied. The Thiodictyon bacteria precipitate poorly crystalline hydrous ferric oxide when they oxidize iron. The precipitate was enriched in the ^{56}Fe relative to Fe(II)_{aq}, with a δ^{56/54}Fe value of +1.5 ± 0.2‰.

==== Magnetotactic bacteria ====
Magnetotactic bacteria are bacteria with magnetosomes that contain magnetic crystals, usually magnetite or greigite, which allow them to orient themselves with the Earth's magnetic field lines. These bacteria mineralize magnetite via the reduction of Fe(III), usually in microaerobic or anoxic environments. In the magnetotactic bacteria that have been studied, there was no significant iron isotope fractionation observed.

==== Phytoplankton ====
Iron is important for the growth of phytoplankton. In phytoplankton, iron is used for electron transfer reactions in photosynthesis in both photosystem I and photosystem II. Additionally, iron is an important component of the enzyme nitrogenase, which is used to fix nitrogen. In measurements at open ocean stations, phytoplankton are isotopically light, with the fractionation as a result of biological uptake measured between -0.25‰ and -0.13‰. Improvement in the understanding of this fractionation will enable the more precise understanding of phytoplankton photosynthetic processes.

==== Animals ====
Iron has many important roles in animal biology, specifically when considering oxygen transport in the bloodstream, oxygen storage in muscles, and enzymes. Known isotope variations are shown in the figure below. Iron isotopes could be useful tracers of the iron biochemical pathways in animals, and also be indicative of trophic levels in a food chain.

Iron isotope variations in humans reflects a number of processes. Specifically, iron in the blood stream reflects dietary iron, which is isotopically lighter than iron in the geosphere. Iron isotopes are distributed heterogeneously throughout the body, primarily to red blood cells, the liver, muscle, skin, enzymes, nails, and hair. Iron losses in the body (intestinal bleeding, bile, sweat, etc.) favor the loss of isotopically heavy iron, with mean losses averaging a δ^{56}Fe of +10‰. Iron absorption in the intestine favors lighter iron isotopes. This is largely due to the fact that iron is carried by transport proteins and transferrin, both of which are kinetic processes, resulting in the preferential uptake of isotopically light iron.

The observed iron isotopic variations in humans and animals are particularly important as tracers. Iron isotopic signatures are utilized to determine the geographic origin of food. Additionally, anthropologists and paleontologists use iron isotope data in order to track the transfer of iron between the geosphere and the biosphere, specifically between plant foods and animals. This allows for the reconstruction of ancient dietary habits based on the variations in iron isotopes in food.

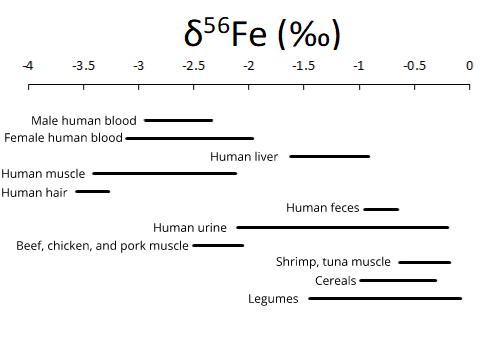
Variations in the iron isotope composition of humans and their food sources.

=== Geochemistry ===
By mass, iron is the most common element on Earth, and it is the fourth most abundant element in the Earth's crust. Thus, iron is widespread throughout the geosphere, and is also common on other planetary bodies. Natural variations in the iron in the geosphere are relatively small. Currently, the values of δ^{56/54}Fe measured in rocks and minerals range from -2.5‰ to +1.5‰. Iron isotope composition is homogeneous in igneous rocks to ±0.05‰, indicating that much of the geologic isotopic variability is a result of the formation of rocks and minerals at low temperature. This homogeneity is particularly useful when tracing processes which result in fractionation through the system. While fractionation of igneous rocks is relatively constant, there are larger variations in the iron isotopic composition of chemical sediments. Thus, iron isotopes are used to determine the origin of the protolith of heavily metamorphosed rocks of a sedimentary origin. Improvements of the understanding regarding the way in which iron isotopes fractionate in the geosphere can help to better understand geologic processes of formation.

=== Natural iron isotopic variations ===
To date, iron is one of the most widely studied trace metals, and iron isotope compositions are relatively well-documented. Based on measurements, iron isotopes exhibit minimal variation (±3‰) in the terrestrial environment. A list of iron isotopic values of different materials from different environments is presented below.

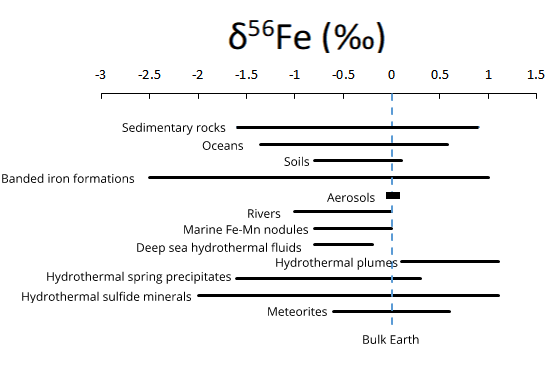
Observed variations in the iron isotope composition in the geosphere. Data obtained from references in the text.

==== In terrestrial environments ====
There is an extreme constancy of the isotopic composition of igneous rocks. The mean value of δ^{56}Fe of terrestrial rocks is 0.00 ± 0.05‰. More precise isotopic measurements indicate that the small deviations from 0.00‰ may reflect a slight mass-dependent fractionation. This mass fractionation has been proposed to be F_{Fe} = 0.039 ± 0.008‰ per atomic mass unit relative to IRMM-014. There may also be slight isotopic variations in igneous rocks depending on their composition and process of formation. The average value of δ^{56}Fe for ultramafic igneous rocks is -0.06‰, whereas the average value of δ^{56}Fe for mid-ocean ridge basalts (MORB) is +0.03‰. Sedimentary rocks exhibit slightly larger variations in δ^{56}Fe, with values between -1.6‰ and +0.9‰ relative to IRMM-014. Banded iron formations δ^{56}Fe span the entire range observed on Earth, from -2.5‰ to +1‰.

==== In the oceans ====
There are slight iron isotopic variations in the oceans relative to IRMM-014, which likely reflect variations in the biogeochemical cycling of iron within a given ocean basin. In the southeastern Atlantic, δ^{56}Fe values between -0.13 and +0.21‰ have been measured. In the north Atlantic, δ^{56}Fe values between -1.35 and +0.80‰ have been measured. In the equatorial Pacific δ^{56}Fe values between -0.03 and +0.58‰ have been measured. The supply of aerosol iron particles to the ocean have an isotopic composition of approximately 0‰. Dissolved iron riverine input to the ocean is isotopically light relative to igneous rocks, with δ^{56}Fe values between -1 and 0‰.

Most modern marine sediments have δ^{56}Fe values similar to those of igneous δ^{56}Fe values. Marine ferromanganese nodules have δ^{56}Fe values between -0.8 and 0‰.

==== In hydrothermal systems ====
Hot (> 300 °C) hydrothermal fluids from mid ocean ridges are isotopically light, with δ^{56}Fe between -0.2 and -0.8‰. Particles in hydrothermal plumes are isotopically heavy relative to the hydrothermal fluids, with δ^{56}Fe between 0.1 and 1.1‰. Hydrothermal deposits have average δ^{56}Fe between -1.6 and 0.3‰. The sulfide minerals within these deposits have δ^{56}Fe between -2.0 and 1.1‰.

==== In extraterrestrial objects ====
Variations in iron isotopic composition have been observed in meteorite samples from other planetary bodies. The Moon has variations in iron isotopes of 0.4‰ per atomic mass unit. Mars has very small isotope fractionation of 0.001 ± 0.006‰ per atomic mass unit. Vesta has iron fractionations of 0.010 ± 0.010‰ per atomic mass unit. The chondritic reservoir exhibits fractionations of 0.069 ± 0.010‰ per atomic mass unit. Isotopic variations observed on planetary bodies can help to constrain and better understand their formation and processes occurring in the early Solar System.

=== Measurement ===
High precision iron isotope measurements are obtained either via thermal ionization mass spectrometry (TIMS) or multi-collector inductively coupled plasma mass spectrometry (MC-ICP-MS).

=== Applications of iron isotopes ===
Iron isotopes have many applications in the geosciences, biology, medicine, and other fields. Their ability to act as isotopic tracers allows for their use to determine information regarding the formation of geologic units and as a potential proxy for life on Earth and other planets. Iron isotopes also have applications in anthropology and paleontology, as they are used to study the diets of ancient civilizations and animals. The widespread uses of iron in biology make its isotopes a promising frontier in biomedical research, specifically their use to prevent and treat blood conditions and other pathological blood diseases. Some of the more prevalent applications of iron isotopes are described below.

==== Banded iron formations ====
Banded iron formations (BIFs) are particularly important when considering the surface environments of the early Earth, which were significantly different from the surface environments observed today. This is manifested in the mineralogy of these formations, which are indicative of different redox conditions. Additionally, BIFs are interesting in that they were deposited while major changes were occurring in the atmosphere and in the biosphere 2.8 to 1.8 billion years ago. Iron isotopic studies can reveal the details of the formation of BIFs, which allows for the reconstruction of redox and climatic conditions at the time of deposition.

BIFs formed as a result of the oxidation of iron by oxygen, which was likely generated by the evolution of cyanobacteria. This was followed by the subsequent precipitation of iron particles in the ocean. Observed variations in the iron isotopic composition of BIFs span the entire range observed on Earth, with δ^{56/54}Fe values between -2.5 and +1‰. The cause of these variations are hypothesized to occur for three reasons. The first relates to the varying mineralogy of the BIFs. Within the BIFs, minerals such as hematite, magnetite, siderite, and pyrite are observed. These minerals each having varying isotopic fractionation, likely as a result of their structures and the kinetics of their growth. The isotopic composition of the BIFs is indicative of the fluids from which they precipitated, which has applications when reconstructing environmental conditions of the ancient Earth. It has also been suggested that BIFs may be biologic in origin. The range of their δ^{56/54}Fe values fall within the range of those observed to occur as a result of biologic processes relating to bacterial metabolic processes, such as those of anoxygenic phototrophic iron-oxidizing bacteria. Ultimately, the improved understanding of BIFs using iron isotope fractionations would allow for the reconstruction of past environments and the constraint of processes occurring on the ancient Earth. However, given that the values observed as a result of biogenic and abiogenic fractionation are relatively similar, the exact processes of BIFs are still unclear. Thus, the continued study and improved understanding of biologic and abiologic fractionation effects would be beneficial in providing better details regarding BIF formation.

==== Iron cycling in the ocean ====
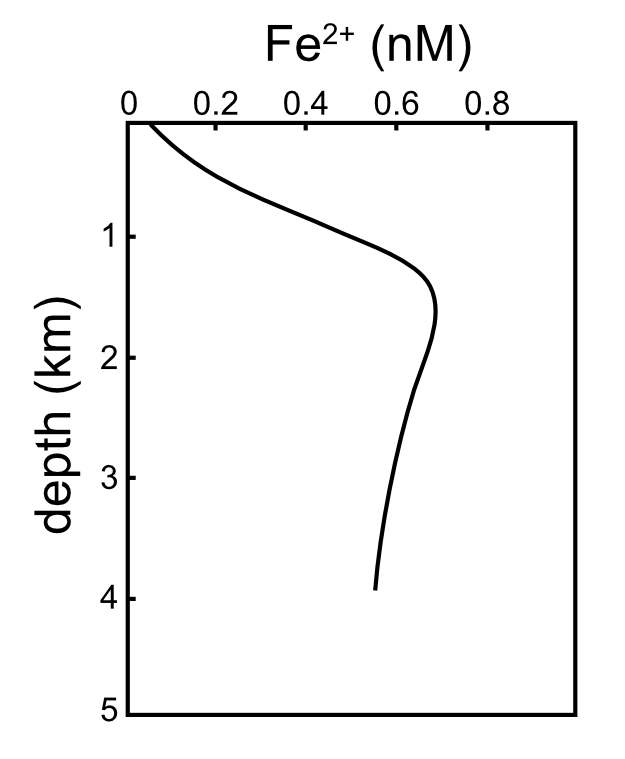
Vertical Fe concentration profile in the Pacific Ocean.

Iron isotopes have become particularly useful in recent years for tracing biogeochemical cycling in the oceans. Iron is an important micronutrient for living species in the ocean, particularly for the growth of phytoplankton. Iron is estimated to limit phytoplankton growth in about one half of the ocean. As a result, the development of a better understanding of sources and cycling of iron in the modern oceans is important. Iron isotopes have been used to better constrain these pathways through data collected by the GEOTRACES program, which has collected iron isotopic data throughout the ocean. Based on the variations in iron isotopes, biogeochemical cycling and other processes controlling iron distribution in the ocean can be elucidated.

For example, the combination of iron concentration and iron isotope data can use to determine the sources of oceanic iron. In the South Atlantic and in the Southern Ocean, isotopically light iron is observed in intermediate waters (200 - 1,300 meters), whereas isotopically heavy iron is observed in surface waters and deep waters (> 1,300 meters). To first order, this demonstrates that there are different sources, sinks, and processes contributing to the iron cycle in varying water masses. The isotopically light iron in intermediate waters suggests that the dominant iron sources include remineralized organic matter. This organic matter is isotopically light because phytoplankton preferentially take up light iron. In the surface ocean, the isotopically heavy iron represents the external sources of iron, such as dust, which is isotopically heavy relative to IRMM-014, and the sink of light isotopes as a result of their preferential uptake by phytoplankton. The isotopically heavy iron in the deep ocean suggests that the iron cycle is dominated by the abiotic, non-reductive release of iron, via desorption or dissolution, from particles. Isotopic analyses similar to the one above are utilized throughout all of the world's oceans to better understand regional variability in the processes which control iron cycling. These analyses can then be synthesized to better model the global biogeochemical cycling of iron, which is particularly important when considering primary production in the ocean.

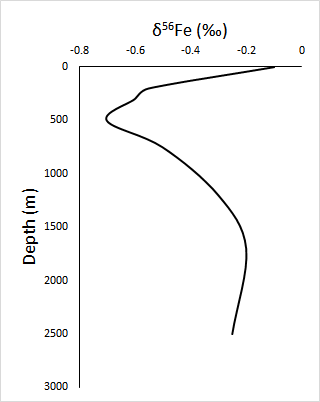
Vertical δ^{56}Fe profile in the Southern Ocean.

==== Constraining processes on extraterrestrial bodies ====
Iron isotopes have been applied for a number of purposes on planetary bodies. Their variations have been measured to more precisely determine the processes that occurred during planetary accretion. In the future, the comparison of observed biological fractionation of iron on Earth to fractionation on other planetary bodies may have astrobiological implications.

===== Planetary accretion =====
One of the primary challenges in the study of planetary accretion is the fact that many tracers of the processes occurring in the early Solar System have been eliminated as a result of subsequent geologic events. Because transition metals do not show large stable isotope fractionations as a result of these events and because iron is one of the most abundant elements in the terrestrial planets, its isotopic variability has been used as a tracer of early Solar System processes.

Iron isotope variations in planetary samples
Planetary body	δ^{57/54}Fe
Vesta	0.031
Mars	0.03
Moon	0.029
Mafic Earth	0.032

Variations in δ^{57/54}Fe between samples from Vesta, Mars, the Moon, and Earth have been observed, and these variations cannot be explained by any known petrological, geochemical, or planetary processes, thus, it has been inferred that the observed fractionations are a result of planetary accretion. It is interesting to note that the isotopic compositions of the Earth and the Moon are much heavier than that of Vesta and Mars. This provides strong support for the giant-impact hypothesis as an impact of this energy would generate large amounts of energy, which would melt and vaporize iron, leading to the preferential escape of the lighter iron isotopes to space. More of the heavier isotopes would remain, resulting in the heavier iron isotopic compositions observed for the Earth and the Moon. The samples from Vesta and Mars exhibit minimal fractionation, consistent with the theory of runaway growth for their formations, as this process would not yield significant fractionations. Further study of the stable isotope of iron in other planetary bodies and samples could provide further evidence and more precise constraints for planetary accretion and other processes that occurred in the early Solar System.

===== Astrobiology =====
The use of iron isotopes may also have applications when studying potential evidence for life on other planets. The ability of microbes to utilize iron in their metabolisms makes it possible for organisms to survive in anoxic, iron-rich environments, such as Mars. Thus, the continual improvement of knowledge regarding the biological fractionations of iron observed on Earth can have applications when studying extraterrestrial samples in the future. While this field of research is still developing, this could provide evidence regarding whether a sample was generated as a result of biologic or abiologic processes depending on the isotopic fractionation. For example, it has been hypothesized that magnetite crystals found in Martian meteorites may have formed biologically as a result of their striking similarity to magnetite crystals produced by magnetotactic bacteria on Earth. Iron isotopes could be used to study the origin of the proposed "magnetofossils" and other rock formations on Mars.

==== Biomedical research ====
Iron plays many roles in human biology, specifically in oxygen transport, short-term oxygen storage, and metabolism Iron also plays a role in the body's immune system. Current biomedical research aims to use iron isotopes to better understand the speciation of iron in the body, with hopes of eventually being able to reduce the availability of free iron, as this would help to defend against infection.

Iron isotopes can also be utilized to better understand iron absorption in humans. The iron isotopic composition of blood reflects an individual's long-term absorption of dietary iron. This allows for the study of genetic predisposition to blood conditions, such as anemia, which will ultimately enable the prevention, identification, and resolution of blood disorders. Iron isotopic data could also aid in identifying impairments of the iron absorption regulatory system in the body, which would help to prevent the development of pathological conditions related to issues with iron regulation.

== Copper ==
=== Stable isotopes and natural abundances ===
Copper has two naturally occurring stable isotopes: ^{63}Cu and ^{65}Cu, which exist in the following natural abundances:

Stable isotopes of copper
Isotope	Abundance (%)
^{63}Cu	69.17
^{65}Cu	30.83

The isotopic composition of Cu is conventionally reported in delta notation (in ‰) relative to a NIST SRM 976 standard:

$\delta^{65}Cu = \left [ \frac{(^{65}Cu/^{63}Cu)_{sample}}{(^{65}Cu/^{63}Cu)_{NIST976}} \right ]$

=== Chemistry ===
Copper can exist in non-ionic form (as Cu^{0}) or in one of two redox states: Cu^{1+} (reduced) or Cu^{2+} (oxidized). Each form of Cu has a specific distribution of electrons (i.e., electron configuration), tabulated below:

Electronic configurations of Cu
Cu form	Electron configuration
Cu^{0}	[Ar] 3d^{10} 4s^{1}
Cu^{1+}	[Ar] 3d^{10} 4s^{0}
Cu^{2+}	[Ar] 3d^{9} 4s^{0}

The electronic configurations of Cu control the number and types of bonds Cu can form with other atoms (e.g., see Copper Biology section). These diverse coordination chemistries are what enable Cu to participate in many different biological and chemical reactions.

Finally, due to its full d-orbital, Cu^{1+} has diamagnetic resonance. In contrast, Cu^{2+} has one unpaired electron in its d-orbital, giving it paramagnetic resonance. The different resonances of the Cu ions enable determination of Cu's redox state by techniques such as electron paramagnetic resonance (epr) spectroscopy, which can identify atoms with unpaired electrons by exciting electron spins.

=== Equilibrium isotope fractionation ===
Transitions between redox species Cu^{1+} and Cu^{2+} fractionate Cu isotopes. ^{63}Cu^{2+} is preferentially reduced over ^{65}Cu^{2+}, leaving the residual Cu^{2+} enriched in ^{65}Cu. The equilibrium fractionation factor for speciation between Cu^{2+} and Cu^{1+} (α_{Cu(II)-Cu(I)}) is 1.00403 (i.e., dissolved Cu^{2+} is enriched in ^{65}Cu by ~+4‰ relative to Cu^{1+}).

=== Biology ===
Copper can be found in the active sites of most enzymes that catalyze redox reactions (i.e., oxidoreductases), as it facilitates single electron transfers while reversibly oscillating between the Cu^{1+} and Cu^{2+} redox states. Enzymes typically contain between one (mononuclear) and four (tetranuclear) copper centers, which enable enzymes to catalyze different reactions. These copper centers coordinate with different ligands depending on the Cu redox state. Oxidized Cu^{2+} preferentially coordinates with "hard donor" ligands (e.g., N- or O-containing ligands such as histidine, aspartic acid, glutamic acid or tyrosine), while reduced Cu^{1+} preferentially coordinates with "soft donor" ligands (e.g., S-containing ligands such as cysteine or methionine). Copper's powerful redox capability makes it critically important for biology, but comes at a cost: Cu^{1+} is a highly toxic metal to cells because it readily abstracts single electrons from organic compounds and cellular material, leading to production of free radicals. Thus, cells have evolved specific strategies for carefully controlling the activity of Cu^{1+} while exploiting its redox behavior.

==== Examples of copper-based enzymes ====
Copper serves catalytic and structural roles in many essential enzymes in biology. In the context of catalytic activity, copper proteins function as electron or oxygen carriers, oxidases, mono- and dioxygenases and nitrite reductases. In particular, copper-containing enzymes include hemocyanins, one flavor of superoxide dismutase (SOD), metallothionein, cytochrome c oxidase, multicopper oxidase and particulate methane monooxygenase (pMMO).

==== Biological fractionation ====
Biological processes that fractionate Cu isotopes are not well-understood, but play an important role in driving the δ^{65}Cu values of materials observed in the marine and terrestrial environments. The natural ^{65}Cu/^{63}Cu varies according to copper's redox form and the ligand to which copper binds. Oxidized Cu^{2+} preferentially coordinates with hard donor ligands (e.g., N- or O-containing ligands), while reduced Cu^{1+} preferentially coordinates with soft donor ligands (e.g., S-containing ligands). As ^{65}Cu is preferentially oxidized over ^{63}Cu, these isotopes tend to coordinate with hard and soft donor ligands, respectively. Cu isotopes can fractionate upon Cu-bacteria interactions from processes that include Cu adsorption to cells, intracellular uptake, metabolic regulation and redox speciation. Fractionation of Cu isotopes upon adsorption to cellular walls appears to depend on the surface functional groups that Cu complexes with, and can span positive and negative values. Furthermore, bacteria preferentially incorporate the lighter Cu isotope intracellularly and into proteins. For example, E. coli, B. subtilis and a natural consortia of microbes sequestered Cu with apparent fractionations (ε^{65}Cu) ranging from ~-1.0 to -4.4‰. Additionally, fractionation of Cu upon incorporation into the apoprotein of azurin was ~-1‰ in P. aeruginosa, and -1.5‰ in E. coli, while ε^{65}Cu values of Cu incorporation into Cu-metallothionein and Cu-Zn-SOD in yeast were -1.7 and -1.2‰, respectively.

=== Geochemistry ===
The concentration of Cu in bulk silicate Earth is ~30 ppm, slightly less than its average concentration (~72 ppm) in fresh mid-oceanic ridge basalt (MORB) glass. Cu^{1+} and Cu^{2+} form a variety of sulfides (often in association with Fe), as well as carbonates and hydroxides (e.g., chalcopyrite, chalcocite, cuprite and malachite). In mafic and ultramafic rocks, Cu tends to be concentrated in sulfidic materials. In freshwater, the predominant form of Cu is free Cu^{2+}; in seawater, Cu complexes with carbonate ligands to form CuCO_{3} and [Cu(CO_{3})_{2}]^{2−}.

=== Measurement ===
In order to measure Cu isotope ratios of various materials, several steps must be taken prior to the isotopic measurement in order to extract and purify copper. The first step in the analytical pipeline to measure Cu isotopes is to liberate Cu from its host material. Liberation should be quantitative, otherwise fractionation may be introduced at this step. Cu-containing rocks are generally dissolved with HF; biological materials are commonly digested with HNO_{3}. Seawater samples must be concentrated due to the low (nM) concentrations of Cu in the ocean. The sample material is subsequently run through an anion-exchange column to isolated and purify Cu. This step can also introduce Cu isotope fractionation if Cu is not quantitatively recovered from the column. If samples are from seawater, other ions (e.g., Na^{+}, Mg^{2+}, Ca^{2+}) must be removed in order to eliminate isobaric interferences during the isotope measurement. Prior to 1992, ^{65}Cu/^{63}Cu ratios were measured via thermal ionization mass spectrometry (TIMS). Today, Cu isotopic compositions are measured via multi-conductor inductively coupled plasma mass spectrometry (MC-ICP-MS), which ionizes samples using inductively coupled plasma and introduces smaller errors than TIMS.

=== Natural copper isotopic variations ===
The field of Cu isotope biogeochemistry is still in a relatively early stage, so the Cu isotope compositions of materials in the environment are not well-documented. However, based on a compilation of measurements already made, it appears that Cu isotope ratios vary somewhat widely within and between environmental materials (e.g., plants, minerals, seawater, etc.), though as a whole, these ratios do not vary by more than ±10‰.

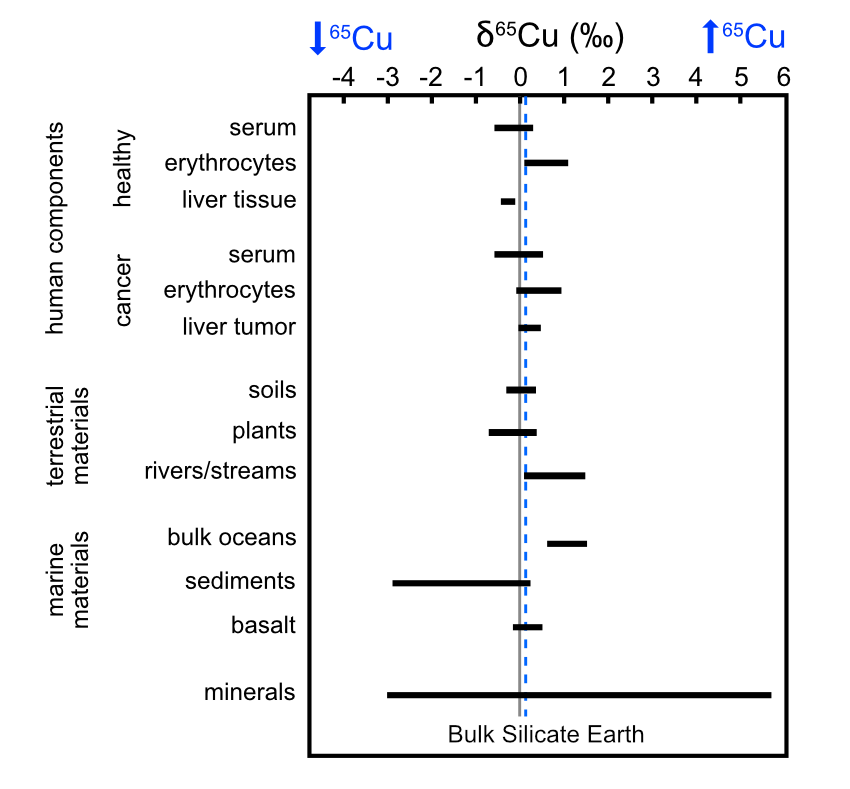
Sampling of natural variations in Cu isotopic compositions of different materials. The δ^{65}Cu value of bulk silicate Earth is shown as a blue dashed line. Ranges of δ^{65}Cu values presented here do not necessarily capture global variations in Cu isotopic compositions of the listed materials; rather, they are based on examples reported in the literature (and cited in the main text).

==== In humans ====
In human bodies, coppers is an important constituent of many essential enzymes, including ceruloplasmin (which carries Cu and oxidizes Fe^{2+} in human plasma), cytochrome c oxidase, metallothionein and superoxide dismutase 1. Serum in human blood is typically ^{65}Cu-depleted by ~0.8‰ relative to erythrocytes (i.e., red blood cells). In a study of 49 male and female blood donors, the average δ^{65}Cu value of the donors' blood serum was -0.26 ± 0.40‰, while that of their erythrocytes was +0.56 ± 0.50‰. In a separate study, δ^{65}Cu values of serum in 20 healthy patients ranged from -0.39 to +0.38‰, while the δ^{65}Cu values of their erythrocytes ranged from +0.57 to +1.24‰. To balance Cu loss due to menstruation, a large portion of Cu in the blood of menstruating women comes from their liver. Due to fractionation associated with Cu transport from the liver to the blood, the total blood of pre-menopausal women is generally ^{65}Cu-depleted relative to that of males and non-menstruating women. The δ^{65}Cu values of healthy human liver tissue in 7 patients ranged from -0.45 to -0.11‰.

==== In the terrestrial environment ====
To first order, δ^{65}Cu values in organisms are driven by the δ^{65}Cu values of source materials. The δ^{65}Cu values of various soils from different regions have been found to vary from -0.34 to +0.33‰ depending on the biogeochemical processes taking place in the soil and the ligands with which Cu complexes. Organic-rich soils generally have lighter δ^{65}Cu values than mineral soils because the organic layers result from plant litter, which is isotopically light.

In plants, δ^{65}Cu values vary between the different components (seeds, roots, stem and leaves). The δ^{65}Cu values the roots of rice, lettuce, tomato and durum wheat plants were found to be 0.5 to 1.0‰ ^{65}Cu-depleted relative to their source, while their shoots were up to 0.5‰ lighter than the roots. Seeds appear to be the most isotopically light component of plants, followed by leaves, then stems.

Rivers sampled throughout the world have a range of dissolved δ^{65}Cu values from +0.02 to +1.45‰. The average δ^{65}Cu values of the Amazon, Brahmaputra and Nile rivers are 0.69, 0.64 and 0.58‰, respectively. The average δ^{65}Cu value of the Chang Jiang river is 1.32‰, while that of the Missouri river is 0.13‰.

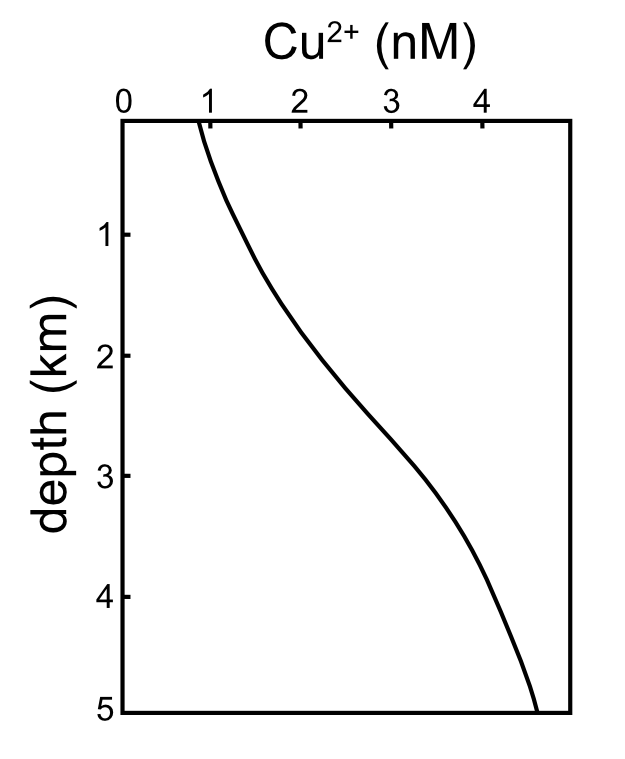
Vertical Cu concentration profile in the Pacific ocean. Adapted from Bruland, 1980

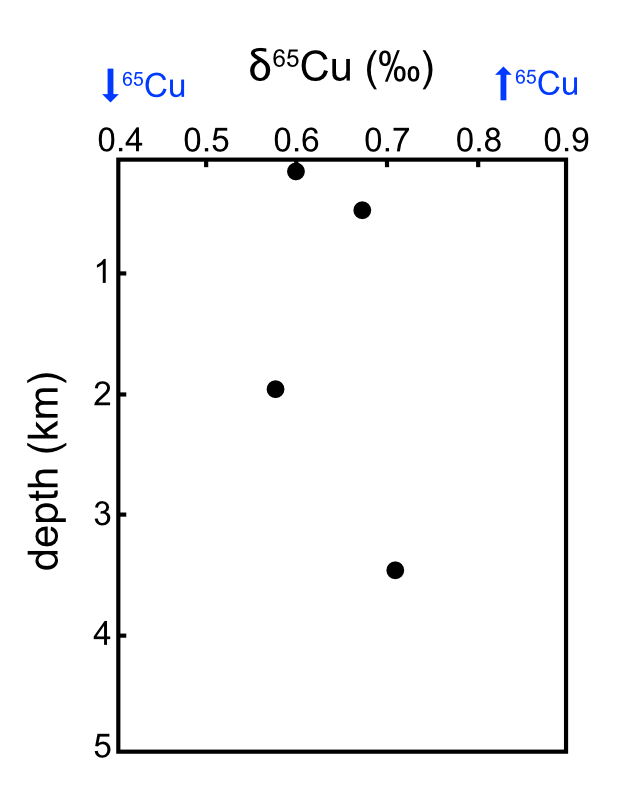
Vertical δ^{65}Cu profile in the Atlantic ocean. Adapted from Boyle et al., 2012

==== In rocks and minerals ====
In general, igneous, metamorphic and sedimentary processes do not appear to strongly fractionate Cu isotopes, while δ^{65}Cu values of Cu minerals vary widely. The average Cu isotopic composition of bulk silicate Earth has been measured as 0.06 ± 0.20‰ based on 132 different terrestrial samples. MORBs and oceanic island basalts (OIBs) generally have homogenous Cu isotopic compositions that fall around 0‰, while arc and continental basalts have more heterogeneous Cu isotope compositions that range from -0.19 to +0.47‰. These Cu isotope ratios of basalts suggest that mantle partial melting imparts negligible Cu isotopic fractionation, while recycling of crustal materials leads to widely variable δ^{65}Cu values. The Cu isotope compositions of copper-containing minerals vary over a wide range, likely due to alteration of the primary high-temperature deposits. In one study that investigated Cu isotopic compositions of various minerals from hydrothermal fields along the mid-Atlantic ridge, chalcopyrite from mafic igneous rocks had δ^{65}Cu values of -0.1 to -0.2‰, while Cu minerals in black smokers (chalcopyrite, bornite, covellite and atacamite) exhibited a wider range of δ^{65}Cu values from -1.0 to +4.0‰. Additionally, atacamite lining the outer rims of black smokers can be up to 2.5‰ heavier than chalcopyrite contained within the black smoker. δ^{65}Cu values of Cu minerals (including chrysocolle, azurite, malachite, cuprite and native copper) in low-temperature deposits have been observed to vary widely over a range of -3.0 to +5.6‰.

==== In the marine environment ====
Cu is strongly cycled in the surface and deep ocean. In the deep ocean, Cu concentrations are ~5 nM in the Pacific and ~1.5 nM in the Atlantic. The deep/surface ratio of Cu in the ocean is typically <10, and vertical concentration profiles for Cu are roughly linear due to biological recycling and scavenging processes as well as adsorption to particles.

Due to equilibrium and biological processes that fractionate Cu isotopes in the marine environment, the bulk copper isotopic composition (δ^{65}Cu = +0.6 to +1.5‰) is different from the δ^{65}Cu values of the riverine input (δ^{65}Cu = +0.02 to +1.45‰, with discharge-weighted average δ^{65}Cu = +0.68‰) to the oceans. δ^{65}Cu values of the surface layers of FeMn-nodules are fairly homogenous throughout the oceans (average = 0.31‰), suggesting low biological demand for Cu in the marine environment compared to that of Fe or Zn. Additionally, δ^{65}Cu values in the Atlantic ocean do not markedly vary with depth, ranging from +0.56 to +0.72‰. However, Cu isotope compositions of material collected on sediment traps at depths of 1,000 and 2,500 m in the central Atlantic ocean show seasonal variation with heaviest δ^{65}Cu values in the spring and summer seasons suggesting seasonal preferential uptake of ^{63}Cu by biological processes.

Equilibrium processes that fractionate Cu isotopes include high temperature ion exchange and redox speciation between mineral phases, and low temperature ion exchange between aqueous species or redox speciation between inorganic species. In riverine and marine environments, ^{65}Cu/^{63}Cu ratios are driven by preferential adsorption of ^{63}Cu to particulate matter and preferential binding of ^{65}Cu to organic complexes. As a net result, ocean sediments tend to be depleted in ^{63}Cu relative to the bulk ocean. For example, the downcore δ^{65}Cu values of a 760 cm sedimentary core taken from the Central Pacific ocean varied from -0.94 to -2.83‰, significantly lighter than the bulk ocean.

=== Applications of copper isotopes ===
==== Medicine ====
Due to its relatively short turnover time of ~6 weeks in the human body, Cu serves as an important indicator of cancer and other diseases that rapidly evolve. The serum of cancer patients contains significantly higher levels of Cu than that of healthy patients due to copper chelation by lactate, which is produced via anaerobic glycolysis by tumor cells. These imbalances in Cu homeostasis are reflected isotopically in the serum and organ tissues of patients with various types of cancer, where the serum of cancer patients is generally ^{65}Cu-depleted relative to the serum of healthy patients, while organ tumors are generally ^{65}Cu-enriched. In one study, the blood components of patients with hepatocellular carcinomas (HCC) was found to be, on average, depleted in ^{65}Cu by 0.4‰ relative to the blood of non-cancer patients. In particular, the δ^{65}Cu values of the serum in patients with HCC ranged from -0.66 to +0.47‰ (compared to serum δ^{65}Cu values of -0.39 to +0.38‰ in matched control patients), and the δ^{65}Cu values of the erythrocytes in the HCC patients ranged from -0.07 to +0.92‰ (compared to erythrocyte δ^{65}Cu values of +0.57 to +1.24‰ in matched control patients). The liver tumor tissues in the HCC patients were ^{65}Cu-enriched relative to healthy liver tissue in the same patients (δ^{65}Cu_{liver, HCC} = -0.02 to +0.43‰; δ^{65}Cu_{liver, healthy} = -0.45 to -0.11‰), and the magnitude of ^{65}Cu-enrichment mirrored that of the ^{65}Cu-depletion observed in the cancer patients' serum. Though our understanding of how copper isotopes are fractionated during cancer physiologies is still limited, it is clear that copper isotope ratios may serve as a powerful biomarker of cancer presence and progression.

== Zinc ==
=== Stable isotopes and natural abundances ===
Zinc has five stable isotopes, tabulated along with their natural abundances below:

Stable isotopes of zinc
Isotope	Abundance (%)
^{64}Zn	48.63
^{66}Zn	27.90
^{67}Zn	4.10
^{68}Zn	18.75
^{70}Zn	0.62

The isotopic composition of Zn is reported in delta notation (in ‰):

$\delta^{x}Zn = \left [ \frac{(^{x}Zn/^{64}Zn)_{sample}}{(^{x}Zn/^{64}Zn)_{std}} \right ]$

where ^{x}Zn is a Zn isotope other than ^{64}Zn (commonly either ^{66}Zn or ^{68}Zn). Standard reference materials used for Zn isotope measurements are JMC 3-0749C, NIST-SRM 683 or NIST-SRM 682.

=== Chemistry ===
Because it has just one valence state (Zn^{2+}), zinc is a redox-inert element. The electronic configurations of Zn^{0} and Zn^{2+} are shown below:

Electronic configurations of Zn
Zn form	Electron configuration
Zn^{0}	[Ar] 3d^{10} 4s^{2}
Zn^{2+}	[Ar] 3d^{10} 4s^{0}

=== Biology ===
Zinc is present in almost 3,000 human proteins, and thus is essential for nearly all cellular functions. Zn is also a key constituent of enzymes involved in cell regulation. Consistent with its ubiquitous presence, total cellular Zn concentrations are typically very high (~200 μM), while the concentrations of free Zn ions in the cytoplasms of cells can be as low as a few hundred picomolar, maintained within a narrow range to avoid deficiency and toxicity. One feature of Zn that makes it so critical in cellular biology is its flexibility in coordination to different numbers and types of ligands. Zn can coordinate with anywhere between three and six N-, O- and S-containing ligands (such as histidine, glutamic acid, aspartic acid and cysteine), resulting in a large number of possible coordination chemistries. Zn tends to bind to metal sites of proteins with relatively high affinities compared to other metal ions which, aside from its important functions in enzymatic reactions, partly explains its ubiquitous presence in cellular enzymes.

==== Examples of zinc-based enzymes ====
Zn is present in the active sites of most hydrolytic enzymes, and is used as an electrophilic catalyst to activate water molecules that ultimately hydrolyze chemical bonds. Examples of zinc-based enzymes include superoxide dismutase (SOD), metallothionein, carbonic anhydrase, Zn finger proteins, alcohol dehydrogenase and carboxypeptidase.

==== Biological fractionation ====
Relatively little is known about isotopic fractionation of zinc by biological processes, but several studies have elucidated that Zn isotopes fractionate during surface adsorption, intracellular uptake processes and speciation. Many organisms, including certain species of fish, plants and marine phytoplankton, have both high- and low-affinity Zn transport systems, which appear to fractionate Zn isotopes differently. A study by John et al. observed apparent isotope effects associated with Zn uptake by the marine diatom Thalassiosira oceanica of -0.2‰ for high-affinity uptake (at low Zn concentrations) and -0.8‰ for low-affinity uptake (at high Zn concentrations). Additionally, in this study, unwashed cells were enriched in ^{65}Zn, indicating preferential adsorption of ^{65}Zn to the extracellular surfaces of T. oceanica. Results from John et al. demonstrating apparent discrimination against the heavy isotope (^{66}Zn) during uptake conflict with results by Gélabert et al. in which marine phytoplankton and freshwater periphytic organisms preferentially uptook ^{66}Zn from solution. The latter authors explained these results as due to a preferential partitioning of ^{66}Zn into a tetrahedrally coordinated structure (i.e., with carboxylate, amine or silanol groups on or inside the cell) over an octahedral coordination with six water molecules in the aqueous phase, consistent with quantum mechanical predictions. Kafantaris and Borrok grew model organisms B. subtilis, P. mendocina and E. coli, as well as a natural bacterial consortium collected from soil, on high and low concentrations of Zn. In the high [Zn] condition, the average fractionation of Zn isotopes imparted by cellular surface adsorption was +0.46‰ (i.e., ^{66}Zn was preferentially adsorbed), while fractionation upon intracellular incorporation varied from -0.2 to +0.5‰ depending on the bacterial species and growth phase. Empirical models of the low [Zn] condition estimated larger Zn isotope fractionation factors for surface adsorption ranging from +2 to +3‰. Overall, Zn isotope ratios in microbes appear to be driven by a number of complex factors including surface interactions, bacterial metal metabolism and metal speciation, but by understanding the relative contributions of these factors to Zn isotope signals, one can use Zn isotopes to investigate metal-binding pathways operating in natural communities of microbes.

=== Geochemistry ===
The concentration of Zn in bulk silicate Earth is ~55 ppm, while its average concentration in fresh mid-oceanic ridge basalt (MORB) glass is ~87 ppm. Like Cu, Zn commonly associates with Fe to form a variety of zinc sulfide minerals such as sphalerite. Additionally, Zn associates with carbonates and hydroxides to form numerous diverse minerals (e.g., smithsonite, sweetite, etc.). In mafic and ultramafic rocks, Zn tends to concentrate in oxides such as spinel and magnetite. In freshwater, Zn predominantly complexes with water to form an octahedrally coordinated aqua ion [Zn(H_{2}O)_{6}]^{2+}. In seawater, Cl^{−} ions replace up to four water molecules in the Zn aqua ion, forming [ZnCl(H_{2}O)_{5}]^{+}, [ZnCl_{2}(H_{2}O)_{4}]^{0} and [ZnCl_{4}(H_{2}O)_{2}]^{−}.

=== Measurement ===
The analytical pipeline for preparation of sample material for Zn isotope measurements is similar to that of Cu, consisting of digestion of host material or concentration from seawater, isolation and purification via anion-exchange chromatography, removal of ions of interfering mass (in particular, ^{64}Ni) and isotope measurement via MC-ICP-MS (see Copper Isotope Measurement section for more details).

=== Natural zinc isotopic variations ===
As with Cu, the field of Zn isotope biogeochemistry is still in a relatively early stage, so the Zn isotope compositions of materials in the environment are not well-documented. However, based on a compilation of some reported measurements, it appears that Zn isotope ratios do not vary widely among environmental materials (e.g., plants, minerals, seawater, etc.), as δ^{66}Zn values of materials typically fall within a range of -1 to +1‰.

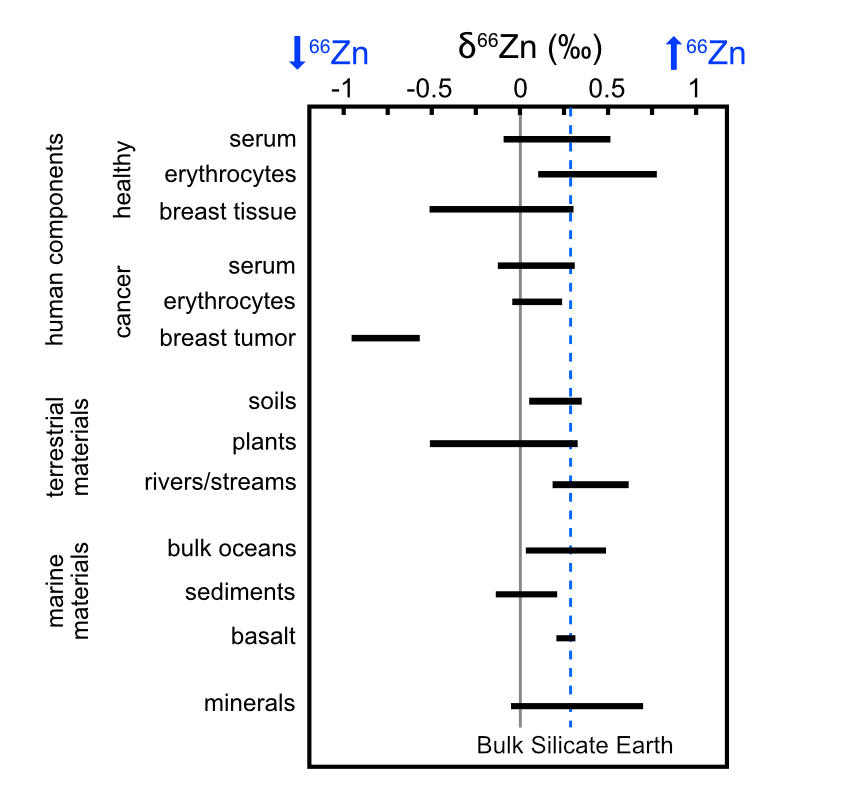
Sampling of natural variations in Zn isotopic compositions of different materials. The δ^{66}Zn value of bulk silicate Earth is shown as a blue dashed line. Ranges of δ^{66}Zn values presented here do not necessarily capture global variations in Zn isotopic compositions of the listed materials; rather, they are based on examples reported in the literature (and cited in the main text).

==== In humans ====
Zn isotope ratios vary between individual blood components, bones and the different organs in humans, though in general, δ^{66}Zn values fall within a narrow range. In the blood of healthy individuals, the Zn isotopic composition of erythrocytes is typically ~0.3‰ lighter than that of serum, and no significant differences in erythrocyte or serum δ^{66}Zn values exist between men and women. For example, in the blood of 49 healthy blood donors, the average erythrocyte δ^{66}Zn value was +0.44 ± 0.33‰, while that of serum was +0.17 ± 0.26‰. In a separate study on 29 donors, a similar average δ^{66}Zn value of +0.29 ± 0.27‰ was obtained for the patients' serum. Additionally, in a small sample set of volunteers, whole blood δ^{66}Zn values were ~+0.15‰ higher for vegetarians than for omnivores, suggesting diet plays an important role in driving Zn isotope compositions in the human body.

==== In the terrestrial environment ====
Zn isotope ratios vary on small scales throughout the terrestrial biosphere. Zn is released into soils during mineral weathering, and isotopes of Zn fractionate upon interaction with mineral and organic components in the soil. In 5 soil profiles collected from Iceland (all derived from the same parent basalt), soil δ^{66}Zn values varied from +0.10 to +0.35‰, and the organic-rich layers were ^{66}Zn-depleted relative to the mineral-rich layers, likely due to contribution by isotopically light organic matter and Zn loss by leaching.

Isotopic discrimination of Zn varies in different components of higher plants, likely due to the various processes involved in Zn uptake, binding, transport, diffusion, speciation and compartmentalization. For example, Weiss et al. observed heavier δ^{66}Zn values in the roots of several plants (rice, lettuce and tomato) relative to the bulk solution in which the plants were grown, and the shoots of those plants were ^{66}Zn-depleted relative to both their roots and bulk solution. Furthermore, Zn isotopes partition differently between different Zn-ligand complexes, so the form of Zn incorporated by organisms in the terrestrial biosphere plays a role in driving Zn isotope compositions of the organisms. In particular, based on ab initio calculations, Zn-phosphate complexes are expected to be isotopically heavier than Zn-citrates, Zn-malates and Zn-histidine complexes by 0.6 to 1‰.

The discharge- and [Zn]-weighted average δ^{66}Zn value of rivers throughout the world is +0.33‰. In particular, the average δ^{66}Zn values of the Kalix and Chang Jiang rivers are +0.64 and +0.56‰, respectively. The Amazon, Missouri and Brahmaputra rivers have average δ^{66}Zn values near +0.30‰, and the average δ^{66}Zn value of the Nile river is +0.21‰.

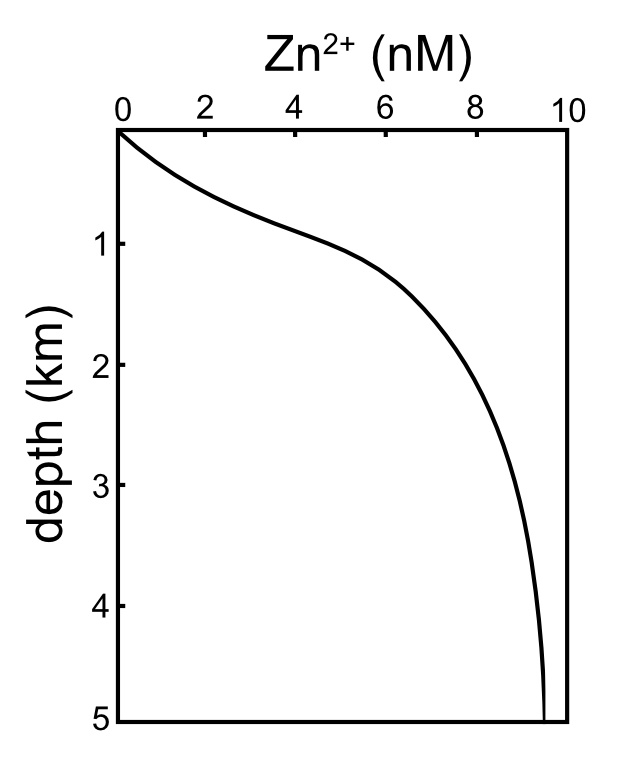
Vertical Zn concentration profile in the Pacific ocean. Adapted from Bruland, 1980

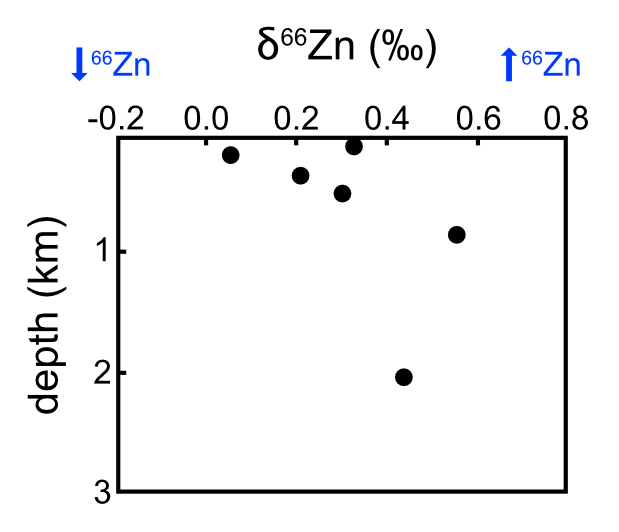
Vertical δ^{66}Zn profile in the Atlantic ocean. Adapted from Boyle et al., 2012

==== In rocks and minerals ====
In general, δ^{66}Zn values of various rocks and minerals do not appear to significantly vary. The δ^{66}Zn value of bulk silicate Earth (BSE) is +0.28 + 0.05‰. Fractionation of Zn isotopes by igneous processes is generally insignificant, and δ^{66}Zn values of basalt fall within the range of +0.2 to +0.3‰, encompassing the value for BSE. δ^{66}Zn values of clay minerals from diverse environments and of diverse ages have been found to fall within the same range as basalts, suggesting negligible fractionation between the basaltic precursors and sedimentary materials. Carbonates appear to be more ^{66}Zn-enriched than other sedimentary and igneous rocks. For example, the δ^{66}Zn value of a limestone core taken from the Central Pacific was +0.6‰ at the surface and increased to +1.2‰ with depth The Zn isotopic compositions of various ores are not well-characterized, but smithsonites and sphalerites (Zn carbonates and Zn sulfides, respectively) collected from various localities in Europe had δ^{66}Zn values ranging from -0.06 to +0.69‰, with smithsonite potentially slightly heavier by 0.3‰ than sphalerite.

==== In the marine environment ====
Zn is an essential biological nutrient in the oceans, and its concentration is largely controlled by uptake by phytoplankton and remineralization. In addition to its critical role in many metalloenzymes (see Zinc Biology section), Zn is an important component of the carbonate shells of foraminifera and siliceous frustules in diatoms. The main inputs of Zn to the ocean are thought to be from rivers and dust. In some photic zones in the ocean, Zn is a limiting nutrient for phytoplankton, and thus its concentration in surface waters serves as one control on marine primary productivity. Zn concentrations are extremely low in the surface ocean (<0.1 nM) but are maximal at depth (~2 nM in the deep Atlantic; ~10 nM in the deep Pacific), indicating a deep regeneration cycle. The deep/surface ratio of Zn is typically on the order of 100, significantly larger than that observed for Cu.

A multitude of complex processes fractionate Zn isotopes in the marine environment. As seen with copper isotopes, the bulk isotopic composition of zinc in the oceans (δ^{66}Zn = +0.5‰) is heavier than that of the riverine input (δ^{66}Zn = +0.3‰), reflecting both equilibrium, biological and other processes that affect Zn isotope ratios in the ocean. In the surface ocean, phytoplankton preferentially uptake ^{64}Zn, and as a result have average δ^{66}Zn values of ~+0.16‰ (i.e., 0.34‰ lighter than the bulk ocean). This preferential removal of ^{64}Zn by photosynthetic marine organisms in the photic zone is most prominent in the spring and summer seasons when primary productivity is highest, and the seasonal variability of Zn isotope ratios is reflected in the δ^{66}Zn values of settling materials, which are heavier (e.g., by ~+0.20‰ in the Atlantic Ocean) during spring and summer than during the colder seasons. Additionally, the surface layers of FeMn-nodules are ^{66}Zn enriched at high-latitudes (average δ^{66}Zn = +1‰), while δ^{66}Zn values of low-latitude samples are smaller and more variable (spanning +0.5 to +1‰). This observation has been interpreted as due to high levels of Zn consumption and preferential uptake of ^{64}Zn above the seasonal thermocline at high latitudes during warmer seasons, and transfer of this heavy δ^{66}Zn signal to the settling sedimentary Fe-Mn hydroxides.

Sources and sinks for Zn isotopes are further highlighted in the vertical profile of ^{66}Zn/^{64}Zn in the water column. In the upper 2,000 m of the Atlantic Ocean, δ^{66}Zn values are highly variable near the surface (δ^{66}Zn = +0.05 to +0.33‰) due to biological uptake and other surface processes, then gradually increase to ~+0.50‰ at 2,000 m depth. Potential sinks for light Zn isotopes, which enrich the residual bulk Zn isotope ratios in the ocean, include binding to and burial with sinking particulate matter, as well as Zn sulfide precipitation in buried sediments. As a result of preferential burial of ^{64}Zn over the heavier Zn isotopes, sediments in the ocean are generally isotopically lighter than that of bulk seawater. For example, δ^{66}Zn values in 8 sedimentary cores from three different continental margins were depleted in ^{66}Zn relative to the bulk ocean (δ^{66}Zn_{cores} = -0.15 to +0.2‰), and furthermore the vertical profiles of δ^{66}Zn values in the cores showed no downcore isotopic variability, suggesting diagenesis does not significantly fractionate Zn isotopes.

=== Applications of zinc isotopes ===
==== Medicine ====
Zn isotopes may be useful as a tracer for breast cancer. Relative to non-cancerous patients, breast cancer patients are known to have significantly higher concentrations of Zn in their breast tissue, but lower concentrations in their blood serum and erythrocytes, due to overexpression of Zn transporters in breast cancer cells. Consistent with these body-wide shifts in Zn homeostasis, δ^{66}Zn values in breast cancer tumors of 5 patients were found to be anomalously light (varying from -0.9 to -0.6‰) relative to healthy tissue in 3 breast cancer patients and 1 healthy control (δ^{66}Zn = -0.5 to -0.3‰). In this study, δ^{66}Zn values of blood and serum were not found to be significantly different between cancerous and non-cancerous patients, suggesting an unknown isotopically heavy pool of Zn must exist in cancer patients. Though results from this study are promising regarding the use of Zn isotope ratios as a biomarker for breast cancer, a mechanistic understanding of how Zn isotopes fractionate during tumor formation in breast cancer is still lacking. Fortunately, increasing attention is being devoted to the use of stable metal isotopes as tracers of cancer and other diseases, and the usefulness of these isotope systems in medical applications will become more apparent in the next few decades.
