= Zinc hydroxide =

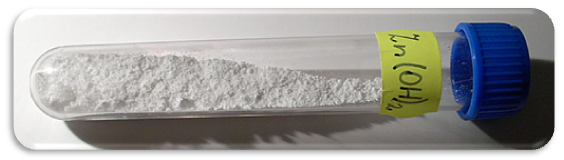
- Zinc hydroxide

Names
- IUPAC name Zinc hydroxide
- Other names Milk of zinc

Identifiers
CAS Number	20427-58-1
3D model (JSmol)	Interactive image
ChemSpider	7988510
ECHA InfoCard	100.039.816
PubChem CID	9812759
UNII	OXK3V8KJ7L
CompTox Dashboard (EPA)	DTXSID7042516
- InChI: InChI=1S/2H2O.Zn/h2*1H2;/q;;+2/p-2 Key: UGZADUVQMDAIAO-UHFFFAOYSA-L; InChI=1/2H2O.Zn/h2*1H2;/q;;+2/p-2 Key: UGZADUVQMDAIAO-NUQVWONBAV
- SMILES: [Zn+2].[OH-].[OH-]

Properties
Chemical formula	Zn(OH)_{2}
Molar mass	99.424 g/mol
Appearance	white powder
Density	3.053 g/cm^{3}, solid
Melting point	125 °C (257 °F; 398 K) (decomposition)
Solubility in water	slightly soluble
Solubility product (K_{sp})	1.8×10^{−14}
Solubility in alcohol	insoluble
Acidity (pK_{a})	3.12, 3.39
Magnetic susceptibility (χ)	−67.0 x 10^{−6} cm^{3}/mol

Thermochemistry
Std enthalpy of formation (Δ_{f}H^{⦵}_{298})	−642 kJ mol^{−1}

Hazards
Flash point	Non-flammable

Related compounds
Other anions	Zinc oxide
Other cations	Cadmium hydroxide
- Except where otherwise noted, data are given for materials in their standard state (at 25 °C [77 °F], 100 kPa). verify (what is ?) Infobox references

Zinc hydroxide is an inorganic chemical compound with the formula Zn(OH)_{2}. It occurs naturally as 3 rare minerals: wülfingite (orthorhombic), ashoverite, and sweetite (both tetragonal).

Like the hydroxides of other metals (such as lead, aluminium, beryllium, tin and chromium), zinc hydroxide (as well as zinc oxide) is amphoteric. It thus dissolves readily in a dilute solution of a strong acid, such as HCl, as well as in a solution of an alkali such as sodium hydroxide.

== Preparation ==
Zinc hydroxide can be prepared by first dissolving zinc oxide in concentrated aqueous solution of sodium hydroxide. The resulting solution is strongly diluted.

Zn^{2+} + 2 OH^{−} → Zn(OH)_{2}

The initial colorless solution contains the zincate ion:

Zn(OH)_{2} + 2 OH^{−} → Zn(OH)_{4}^{2−}

Zinc hydroxide will dissolve because the ion is normally surrounded by water ligands; when excess sodium hydroxide is added to the solution, the hydroxide ions will reduce the complex to a −2 charge and make it soluble. When excess ammonia is added, it sets up an equilibrium which provides hydroxide ions; the formation of hydroxide ions causes a similar reaction as sodium hydroxide and creates a +2 charged complex with a coordination number of 4 with the ammonia ligands, making the complex soluble so that it dissolves.

Unlike the hydroxides of aluminium and lead, zinc hydroxide also dissolves in excess aqueous ammonia to form a colorless, water-soluble ammine complex.

== Applications ==
One major use is as an absorbent in surgical dressings. It is also used to find zinc salts by mixing sodium hydroxide with the suspect salt.
