= Sweetite =

Mineral

General
- Category: Hydroxide mineral
- Formula: Zn(OH)_{2}
- IMA symbol: Sw
- Strunz classification: 4.FA.10
- Crystal system: Tetragonal; Unknown space group
- Crystal class: Trapezohedral (422); H-M symbol: (422)
- Space group: P4_{1}2_{1}2 (no. 92) or P4_{3}2_{1}2 (no. 96)
- Unit cell: a = 8.22, c = 14.34 [Å] V = 968.93 Å^{3}; Z = 20

Identification
- Formula mass: 99.40 g/mol
- Color: Colorless, white
- Crystal habit: Bipyramidal
- Cleavage: None
- Fracture: Irregular
- Mohs scale hardness: 3
- Luster: Vitreous
- Streak: White
- Diaphaneity: Transparent to translucent
- Specific gravity: 3.33
- Optical properties: Uniaxial (−)
- Refractive index: n_{ω} = 1.635 n_{ε} = 1.628
- Birefringence: 0.007

Sweetite has a general formula of Zn(OH)_{2}. The name is given after a curator of mineral department of the British Museum, Jessie May Sweet (1901–1979). It occurs in an oxidized vein in limestone bedrock with galena, ashoverite, wülfingite, anglesite, cerussite, hydrocerussite, litharge, fluorite, palygorskite and calcite.

Sweetite is tetragonal, which means crystallographically it contains one axis of unequal length and two axes of equal length. The angles between three of the axes are all 90°. It belongs to the space group 4/m. Some crystals show evidence of a basal plane and a few are tabular. In terms of its optical properties, sweetite has two indices of refraction, 1.635 along the ordinary ray and 1.628 along the extraordinary ray. The index of refraction is the velocity of light in vacuum divided by the velocity of light in medium. It also has the birefringence of 0.007. The birefringence means the decomposition of light into two rays when passing through a mineral. Sweetite is 1.64–1.65 in relief, which is medium to high in intensity and means a measure of the relative difference between the index of refraction of a mineral and its surrounding medium.

Sweetite is mostly found from a limestone quarry 200–300 m northwest of Milltown, near Ashover, Derbyshire, England.
