= Tetrachlorozincate =

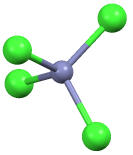

Identifiers
CAS Number	15201-05-5
3D model (JSmol)	Interactive image
ChEBI	CHEBI:88170
ChemSpider	55645
PubChem CID	61755
CompTox Dashboard (EPA)	DTXSID801015719
- InChI: InChI=1S/4ClH.Zn/h4*1H;/q;;;;+2/p-4 Key: PZVVXRYHDITUNJ-UHFFFAOYSA-J
- SMILES: Cl[Zn-2](Cl)(Cl)Cl

Properties
Chemical formula	[ZnCl_{4}]^{2−}
Molar mass	207.18 g·mol^{−1}

Related compounds
Other anions	Tetrafluorozincate
Other cations	Tetrachlorocuprate; Tetrachloronickelate
- Except where otherwise noted, data are given for materials in their standard state (at 25 °C [77 °F], 100 kPa). Infobox references

Tetrachlorozincate is an anion with the formula [ZnCl_{4}]^{2−}. It is a counterion that is often used in conjunction with strong electrophiles. Being dianionic, tetrachlorozincate is not classified as a weakly coordinating anion. On the other hand, being dianionic, tetrachlorozincate facilitates the crystallization of many salts. It has a tetrahedral molecular geometry. A simple example is [NH_{4}]_{2}[ZnCl_{4}] (ammonium tetrachlorozincate). Zincates are anionic zinc complexes.

Related to the preparation of Lucas' reagent, tetrachlorozincates are often generated by combining hydrochloric acid and zinc chloride.

A related anion is [Zn_{2}Cl_{6}]^{2−}, in which again Zn(II) adopts a tetrahedral geometry.

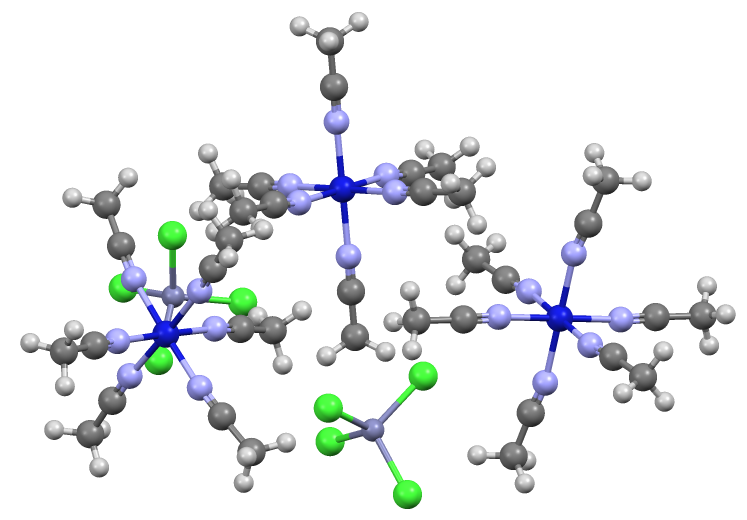
Portion of the crystal structure of the salt hexaacetonitrilenickel(II) tetrachlorozincate ([Ni(CH_{3}CN)_{6}]^{2+}[ZnCl_{4}]^{2−}).

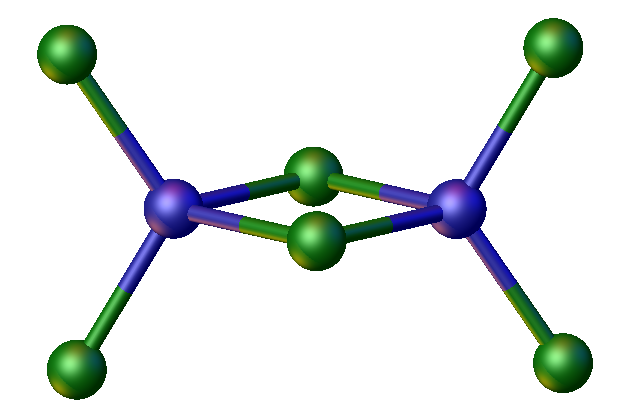
The structure of [Zn_{2}Cl_{6}]^{2−}.
