= CYP4F2 =

Human enzyme

Identifiers
- Aliases: CYP4F2, CPF2, cytochrome P450 family 4 subfamily F member 2
- External IDs: OMIM: 604426; MGI: 1919304; GeneCards: CYP4F2
Enzyme activity
EC #	BRENDA	ExPASy	KEGG	MetaCyc
1.14.14.1	↗	↗	↗	↗
1.14.14.78	↗	↗	↗	↗
1.14.14.79	↗	↗	↗	↗
1.14.14.94	↗	↗	↗	↗

Gene location (Human)
Chr.	Chromosome 19 (human)
Band	19p13.12	Start	15,878,023 bp
Band	19p13.12	End	15,898,077 bp

Gene location (Mouse)
Chr.	Chromosome 8 (mouse)
Band	8|8 B3.3	Start	72,742,326 bp
Band	8|8 B3.3	End	72,763,470 bp
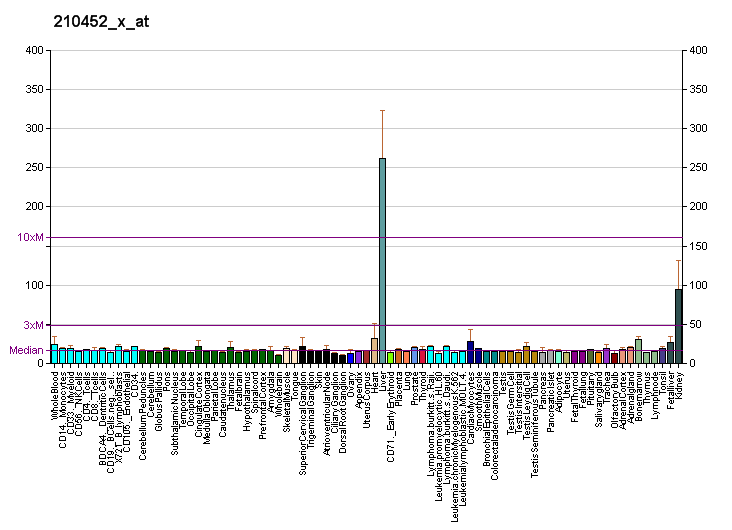

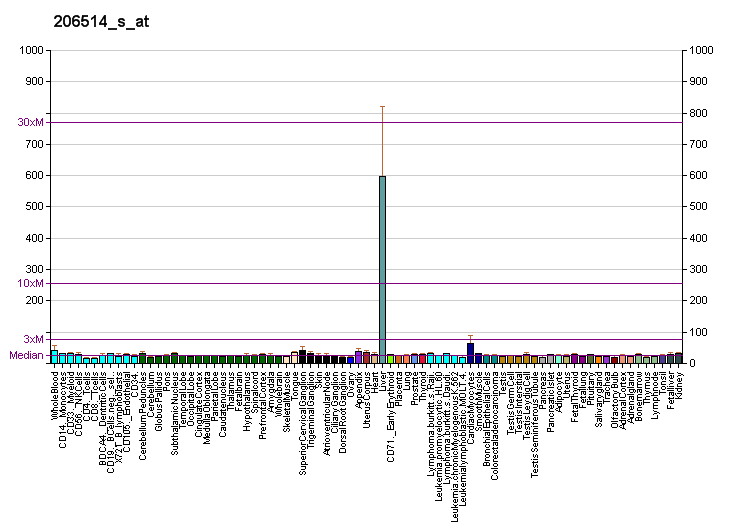
RNA expression pattern
Bgee	Human / Mouse (ortholog); Top expressed in: jejunal mucosa; right lobe of liver; mucosa of ileum; duodenum; corpus epididymis; kidney tubule; glomerulus; gonad; mucosa of transverse colon; metanephric glomerulus / Top expressed in: granulocyte; blood; spleen; mesenteric lymph nodes; bone marrow; stroma of bone marrow; subcutaneous adipose tissue; morula; white adipose tissue; right lung lobe; More reference expression data
BioGPS	More reference expression data
Gene ontology
Molecular function	iron ion binding; arachidonic acid omega-hydroxylase activity; alpha-tocopherol omega-hydroxylase activity; arachidonic acid epoxygenase activity; tocotrienol omega-hydroxylase activity; tocopherol omega-hydroxylase activity; metal ion binding; alkane 1-monooxygenase activity; protein binding; heme binding; oxidoreductase activity, acting on paired donors, with incorporation or reduction of molecular oxygen; oxidoreductase activity; oxidoreductase activity, acting on paired donors, with incorporation or reduction of molecular oxygen, NAD(P)H as one donor, and incorporation of one atom of oxygen; leukotriene-B4 20-monooxygenase activity; 20-aldehyde-leukotriene B4 20-monooxygenase activity; 20-hydroxy-leukotriene B4 omega oxidase activity; monooxygenase activity
Cellular component	cytoplasm; organelle membrane; endoplasmic reticulum membrane; intracellular membrane-bounded organelle; membrane; apical plasma membrane; endoplasmic reticulum; integral component of membrane
Biological process	leukotriene metabolic process; epoxygenase P450 pathway; very long-chain fatty acid metabolic process; icosanoid metabolic process; blood coagulation; negative regulation of icosanoid secretion; pressure natriuresis; regulation of blood pressure; vitamin E metabolic process; phylloquinone catabolic process; omega-hydroxylase P450 pathway; renal water homeostasis; positive regulation of icosanoid secretion; sodium ion homeostasis; long-chain fatty acid metabolic process; vitamin K catabolic process; menaquinone catabolic process; leukotriene B4 catabolic process; arachidonic acid metabolic process
Sources:Amigo / QuickGO
Orthologs
Databases	NCBI: entry; OMA: entry
Species	Human	Mouse
Entrez	8529	72054
Ensembl	ENSG00000186115	ENSMUSG00000003484
UniProt	P78329	Q99N16
RefSeq (mRNA)	NM_001082	NM_024444
RefSeq (protein)	NP_001073	NP_077764
Location (UCSC)	Chr 19: 15.88 – 15.9 Mb	Chr 8: 72.74 – 72.76 Mb
PubMed search
- Wikidata
View/Edit Human	View/Edit Mouse

Cytochrome P450 4F2
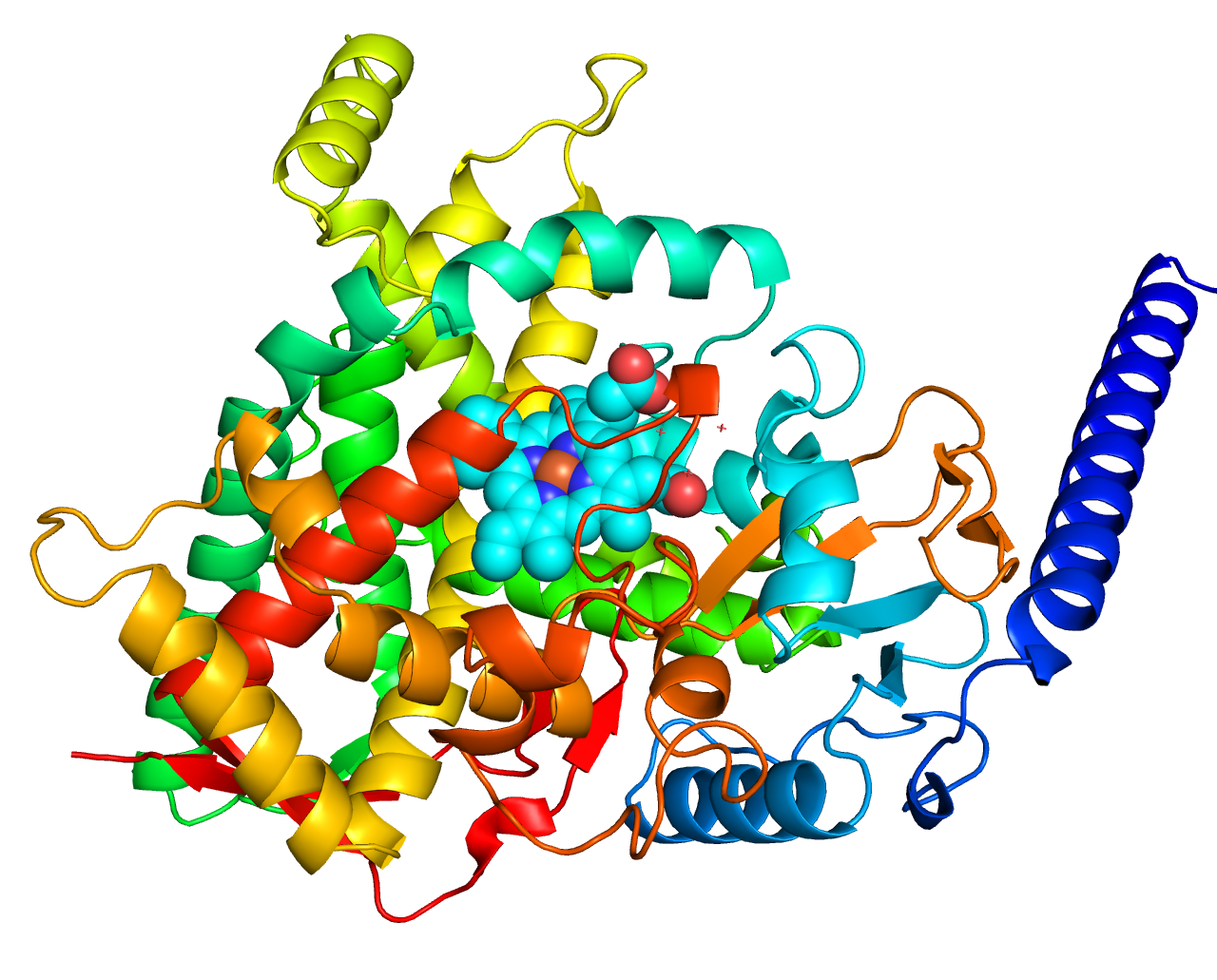
- Protein structure of cytochrome P450 4F2 (leukotriene-B_{4} omega-hydroxylase 1) enzyme

Identifiers
- EC no.: 1.14.14.94
- CAS no.: 90119-11-2
- Alt. names: CYP4F2, 20-HETE synthase; 20-hydroxyeicosatetraenoic acid synthase; CYPIVF2; arachidonic acid omega-hydroxylase; cytochrome P450, family 4, subfamily F, polypeptide 2; cytochrome P450, subfamily IVF, polypeptide 2; cytochrome P450-LTB-omega; docosahexaenoic acid omega-hydroxylase; leucotriene-B_{4} ω-hydroxylase; leukotriene-B(4) 20-monooxygenase 1; leukotriene-B(4) omega-hydroxylase 1; LTB4 omega-hydroxylase; phylloquinone omega-hydroxylase CYP4F2.

Databases
- BRENDA: enzyme data
- ExPASy: NiceZyme view
- KEGG: enzyme entry
- MetaCyc: metabolic pathway
- Rhea: reactions
- PDB structures: RCSB PDB PDBe PDBsum
Search
- PMC: articles
- PubMed: articles
- NCBI: proteins

Cytochrome P450 4F2 (CYP4F2) is a human enzyme belonging to the cytochrome P450 (CYP) superfamily. It regulates inflammation by inactivating leukotriene B_{4}, a potent inflammatory mediator, and genetic variations in its encoding gene (CYP4F2, part of a cluster of cytochrome P450 genes on chromosome 19) affect the dosing of the anticoagulant warfarin.

CYP enzymes function primarily as monooxygenases, adding a hydroxy group to their substrates. They are most highly expressed in the liver and are responsible for about 80% of oxidative metabolism and about 50% of the elimination of commonly used drugs in humans.

The primary substrate of CYP4F2 is leukotriene B_{4} (LTB4), an eicosanoid inflammatory mediator. By hydroxylating LTB4 to its inactivated form 20-hydroxy-LTB4, the enzyme helps regulate inflammation. CYP4F2 also metabolizes other eicosanoids derived from arachidonic acid in white blood cells.

CYP4F2 also metabolizes certain fatty acids and fat-soluble vitamins, including vitamin E and vitamin K, and bioactivates prodrugs such as pafuramidine. Genetic variations in CYP4F2 affect enzymatic activity, with implications for vitamin K bioavailability and the dosing of vitamin K antagonists like warfarin.

== Gene ==
The cytochrome P450 4F2 protein is encoded by the CYP4F2 gene in humans.

CYP4F2 is part of a cluster of cytochrome P450 genes located on chromosome 19, with another closely related gene, CYP4F11, located approximately 16 kbp away. The CYP4F2 gene is composed of no fewer than 13 exons. The protein-coding sequence of the gene is from the second through the thirteenth exon, whereas the first exon contains a 49‑base‑pair segment forming part of the 5′ untranslated region, which makes the overall genomic organization of CYP4F2 very similar to that of CYP4F3.

Gene polymorphisms (variants) in CYP4F2 affect liver mRNA levels and enzymatic activity of the protein encoded.

The analysis of the gene on a molecular level presents several difficulties:

- CYP4F2 is highly polymorphic, meaning that many genetic variants are present within the population; this makes it challenging to identify specific causal variants responsible for phenotypic effects or disease associations.
- CYP4F2 is located within a cluster of genes of the CYP4F subfamily; these genes exhibit high homology, which can lead to difficulties in distinguishing between different subfamily members during genetic analysis, including distinguishing functional genes from pseudogenes within the cluster.
- The genes of the CYP4F subfamily tend to be closely linked on the chromosome and inherited together due to linkage disequilibrium, making it challenging to differentiate one gene's sequence from closely related genes or pseudogenes.

== Protein ==
The crystal structure of CYP4F2 has not been experimentally determined. Researchers have used homology modeling and molecular docking to construct theoretical models of the enzyme's structure and predict how it interacts with its substrates.

== Species ==
The CYP4F subfamily is conserved across vertebrates, including mammals, birds, amphibians, and ray-finned fishes. However, CYP4F2 is a human gene designation; other species have their own CYP4F genes with different numbers (for example, the mouse ortholog is Cyp4f14). The CYP4 family has also been identified in invertebrate groups such as Ascidiacea, Echinoidea, Gastropoda, and Insecta, though these organisms have distinct CYP4 subfamily members rather than direct CYP4F2 equivalents.

CYP4 enzymes from the same subfamily are often assumed to have similar functions across species, but this may not hold true, as CYP4 enzymes may have diverged in their biochemical properties and gene expression patterns over evolutionary time.

== Tissue and subcellular distribution ==
In humans, CYP4F2 is expressed in various tissues, including the liver, duodenum, small intestine, kidney, bone marrow, epididymis, and prostate, with the highest expression in the liver. CYP4F2 expression can be influenced by various factors, such as genetic variations, dietary intake, drug interactions, and inflammatory conditions.

The CYP4F2 protein localizes to the endoplasmic reticulum (ER) membrane. Specifically, CYP4F2 resides in the smooth endoplasmic reticulum, where it interacts with electron transfer partners such as NADPH-cytochrome P450 reductase and cytochrome b_{5}. The Human Protein Atlas has not yet completed experimental immunofluorescence imaging for CYP4F2 in its cell line panel.

== Function ==
=== The cytochrome P450 superfamily ===
CYP4F2 is a member of the cytochrome P450 (CYP) superfamily, a group of hemoprotein enzymes bound to cell membranes that are most abundant in the liver. CYP enzymes are involved in cellular metabolism, hormone synthesis, and cholesterol metabolism, and are responsible for about 80% of oxidative metabolism and about 50% of drug elimination in humans. CYP enzymes are frequently targeted in drug development due to their roles in vascular function, sex hormone biosynthesis, and inflammatory response.

=== The CYP4F subfamily ===
The CYP4F subfamily of CYP enzymes exhibits diverse metabolic specificities, but is characterized by the ω-hydroxylation of very long-chain fatty acids (VLCFA), eicosanoids, lipophilic (fat-soluble) vitamins, and hydroxyeicosatetraenoic acids (HETEs). The cytochrome P450 4F2 protein is an enzyme also known as "leukotriene-B_{4} ω-hydroxylase 1", because it starts the process of inactivating and degrading leukotriene B_{4} (LTB4), a potent mediator of inflammation, by ω-hydroxylating it to 20-hydroxy-LTB4.

CYP4F2 and CYP4F3 catalyze the omega-hydroxylation of pro- and anti-inflammatory leukotrienes, modulating their biological activities. Other CYP4F subfamily members have related but distinct roles: CYP4F8 and CYP4F12 metabolize prostaglandins and arachidonic acid, while CYP4F11 and CYP4F12 can also hydroxylate xenobiotics such as certain drugs. The related CYP4X and CYP4Z subfamilies remain classified as "orphan" enzymes with incompletely characterized physiological functions.

The CYP4F subfamily plays a role in the development of cancer. Enzymes such as CYP4F2 and CYP4F3B convert arachidonic acid into 20-Hydroxyeicosatetraenoic acid (20-HETE), an eicosanoid metabolite of arachidonic acid. This metabolite impacts the progression of tumors, the formation of new blood vessels (angiogenesis), and the regulation of blood pressure in blood vessels and kidneys.

=== CYP4F2 within the subfamily ===
Beyond its role in degrading LTB4, CYP4F2 metabolizes various endogenous substrates including fatty acids, eicosanoids, and fat-soluble vitamins. It regulates the bioavailability of vitamin E by catalyzing the rate-limiting step in vitamin E catabolism, and also regulates the bioavailability of vitamin K, a co-factor required for blood clotting.

Gene polymorphisms in CYP4F2 affect enzymatic activity. Variations that alter vitamin K bioavailability also affect the dosing of vitamin K antagonists such as warfarin, coumarin, or acenocoumarol.

CYP4F2 also regulates the bioactivation of certain drugs, such as the anti-parasitic prodrug pafuramidine, by catalyzing the initial oxidative O-demethylation in human liver and intestinal microsomes to produce its active form, furamidine. The enzyme additionally plays a role in renal water homeostasis through its production of 20-HETE.

=== Metabolism of leukotriene B_{4} ===
==== Biosynthesis of leukotriene B_{4} from arachidonic acid ====
Leukotriene B_{4} (LTB4) is a type of lipid mediator that belongs to the family of leukotrienes, which are derived from arachidonic acid by the action of 5-lipoxygenase (5-LOX).

Arachidonic acid is a polyunsaturated fatty acid that is present in the phospholipids of cell membranes. This fatty acid can be released from the membrane by the action of phospholipase A2, a peripheral membrane protein, which is activated by stimuli such as hormones, cytokines, growth factors and stress. Arachidonic acid can then be metabolized by three major pathways: the cyclooxygenase (COX) pathway, the lipoxygenase (LOX) pathway, and the cytochrome P450 (CYP) pathway. These pathways produce different types of lipid mediators, which are collectively called eicosanoids.

Eicosanoids are a group of bioactive molecules that have diverse and potent effects on physiological and pathological processes such as inflammation, immunity, pain, fever, blood pressure, blood clotting, reproduction and cancer. There are multiple types of eicosanoids, such as prostaglandins, leukotrienes, hydroxyeicosatetraenoic acids (HETEs), and so on.

Leukotriene B_{4} (LTB4) is one of the eicosanoids that is produced by the LOX pathway. LTB4 is synthesized from arachidonic acid by the sequential actions of 5-LOX, 5-lipoxygenase-activating protein, and leukotriene A4 hydrolase.

LTB4 is produced by activated innate immune cells, such as neutrophils, macrophages and mast cells. It induces the activation of polymorphonuclear leukocytes, monocytes and fibroblasts, the production of superoxide and the release of cytokines to attract neutrophils.

==== The role of leukotriene B_{4} in inflammatory response ====
LTB4 initiates and maintains inflammation, as it can recruit and activate immune cells such as neutrophils, macrophages, mast cells, monocytes and fibroblasts. LTB4 also stimulates the production of reactive oxygen species, cytokines, chemokines and cell adhesion molecules, which further amplify the inflammatory response.

==== Inactivation of leukotriene B_{4} by CYP4F2 ====
Hydroxylation of Leukotriene B_{4} catalyzed by CYP4F2

Excessive or prolonged inflammation can be harmful to the host, as it can cause tissue damage and chronic diseases, so that the inflammatory process must be tightly regulated and resolved in a timely manner. One of the mechanisms that contributes to the resolution of inflammation is the enzymatic inactivation and degradation of LTB4 by the cytochrome P450 (CYP) family of enzymes. CYP enzymes are mainly expressed in the liver, but they can also be found in other tissues, such as the lungs, kidneys, intestines, and skin.

Among the CYP enzymes, CYP4F2 is the most important for the metabolism of LTB4. It catalyzes the omega-hydroxylation of LTB4 as the first step of inactivation, converting it to 20-hydroxy-LTB4, which has much lower biological activity. CYP4F2 then converts 20-hydroxy-LTB4 to 20-oxo-LTB4 and then to 20-carboxy-LTB4, which are both inactive and can be excreted from the body.

=== Fatty acid ω-hydroxylation ===
CYP4F2 belongs to cytochrome P450 omega hydroxylase set of enzymes that catalyze the addition of a hydroxy functional group (−OH) to a molecule of the fatty acid substrate. Specifically, CYP4F2 performs ω-hydroxylation of fatty acids, which means that the functional group is added to the ω- or (ω-1)-C atom. In the context of fatty acids, the ω (omega) atom refers to the carbon atom (C) at the end of the hydrocarbon chain, furthest from the carboxyl group, so that the ω- or (ω-1)-C atom refers to the last carbon atom or the second-to-last carbon atom in the hydrocarbon chain of the fatty acid: the hydroxy group (−OH) is added to one of these atoms during the ω-hydroxylation process.

The enzymes which are members of the CYP4A and CYP4F sub-families, including CYP4F2, may ω-hydroxylate and thereby reduce the activity of fatty acid metabolites of arachidonic acid such as LTB4, 5-HETE, 5-oxo-eicosatetraenoic acid, 12-HETE, and several prostaglandins. These enzymatic reactions lead to the production of metabolites involved in regulating inflammatory and vascular responses in animals and humans. By reducing the activity of these fatty acid metabolites, ω-hydroxylation plays a role in dampening inflammatory pathways and maintaining immune system balance.

Certain single-nucleotide polymorphisms (SNPs) in the CYP4F2 have been associated with human diseases like Crohn's disease and Coeliac disease. These genetic variations may impact the function or expression level of the enzyme, influencing its ability to perform ω-hydroxylation reactions effectively.

The CYP4F2 enzyme also catalyzes ω-hydroxylation of 3-hydroxy fatty acids. It converts monoepoxides of linoleic acid leukotoxin and isoleukotoxin to ω-hydroxylated metabolites. By ω-hydroxylating 3-hydroxy fatty acids, the enzyme contributes to the modification of these molecules, which can have implications for their signaling functions in cellular processes. The production of ω-hydroxylated metabolites from monoepoxides derived from linoleic acid leukotoxin and isoleukotoxin helps regulate inflammation by reducing their activity as pro-inflammatory mediators.

The enzyme also contributes to the degradation of VLCFAs by catalyzing successive ω-oxidations and chain shortening. This enzymatic activity ensures efficient breakdown and clearance of these fatty acids, preventing accumulation that could lead to metabolic imbalances or contribute to disease pathology.

=== Fatty acid chain shortening ===
The process of chain shortening refers to the modification of a fatty acid molecule by removing carbon atoms from its chain. Fatty acids are organic molecules consisting of a long hydrocarbon chain, typically with an even number of carbon (C) atoms. These chains can vary in length, and their length affects their biological activities. CYP4F2 acts on fatty acids and introduces oxidative reactions that lead to the removal of carbon atoms from the chain. This process is often accompanied by the addition of oxygen to the fatty acid molecule, resulting in the formation of metabolites or breakdown products. By shortening the fatty acid chains, the CYP4F2 enzyme plays a role in vitamin metabolism. This process can affect the bioavailability, transportation, and utilization of certain fat-soluble vitamins in the body. The specific impact of chain shortening on vitamin metabolism may vary depending on the specific fatty acid and vitamin involved. This process is essential for maintaining lipid homeostasis and regulating biological activities influenced by fatty acids.

Fatty acid chain shortening by CYP4F2 is performed by their α-, β-, and ω-oxidation, with the preferred pathway being the β-oxidation in the mitochondria and peroxisomes. VLCFAs cannot be β-oxidized. The number of carbon atoms in the chains of such acids exceeds 22. Such chains must be shortened before being oxidized by mitochondria. The CYP4F2 enzyme is involved in catalyzing the ω-oxidation and chain shortening of such acids. CYP4F2 also mediates the metabolism of long-chain polyunsaturated fatty acids (PUFAs), such as ω−3 and ω−6 fatty acids, which are required for physiological processes such as brain development, inflammation modulation, and cardiovascular health.

=== Metabolism of vitamins ===
The enzyme plays its role in metabolism of vitamins E and K by chain shortening, i.e., by reducing the number of carbon atoms in certain hydrocarbon chains of the molecules of the vitamin, depending on a particular vitamin molecule. This process is also known as ω-hydroxylation, because it involves adding a hydroxy group (-OH) to the last carbon atom (omega position) of the chain. This hydroxylation makes the vitamin molecule more polar (increase chemical polarity) and less stable, and opens it to further degradation by other enzymes.

CYP4F2 is the only known enzyme to ω-hydroxylate tocotrienols and tocopherols which are forms (vitamers) of vitamin E, thus making it a key regulator of circulating plasma vitamin E levels. It catalyzes ω-hydroxylation of the phytyl chain of tocopherols, with preference for γ-tocopherols over α-tocopherols, thus promoting retention of α-tocopherols in tissues.

Vitamin E is a collective term for eight different molecules that have antioxidant properties and protect cell membranes from oxidative damage. They are divided into two groups: tocotrienols and tocopherols. Both groups have a chromanol ring, which is the active part of the molecule, and a phytyl chain, which is a long hydrocarbon tail. CYP4F2 shortens the phytyl chain of both tocopherols and tocotrienols by ω-hydroxylation, which reduces their biological activity and stability.

Vitamin K is a collective term for two natural forms of vitamin K: vitamin K_{1} (phylloquinone) and vitamin K_{2} (menaquinone). Vitamin K is essential for the synthesis of several proteins involved in blood clotting and bone metabolism. Vitamin K_{1} has a phytyl chain, similar to vitamin E, while vitamin K_{2} has an isoprenoid chain, which is a series of five-carbon units. CYP4F2 shortens the phytyl chain of vitamin K_{1} and the isoprenoid chain of vitamin K_{2} by ω-hydroxylation, which reduces their biological activity and stability.

Both types of Vitamin K (K_{1} and K_{2}) can be used as co-factors for γ-glutamyl carboxylase, an enzyme that catalyzes the post-translational modification of Vitamin K-dependent proteins, thus biochemically activating the proteins involved in blood coagulation and bone mineralization.

CYP4F2 modulates circulating levels of vitamin K_{1} by ω-hydroxylating and deactivating it: in the liver, where this enzyme is predominantly expressed, it is the primary oxidase that metabolizes vitamin K_{1} into hydroxylated forms. By doing so, it acts synergistically with VKORC1 enzyme to prevent excessive accumulation of biologically active vitamin K in the body. Termed the "siphoning" pathway, this mechanism primarily occurs when there is an excess amount of vitamin K_{1} present. Through this process, CYP4F2 is a negative regulator of active vitamin K_{1} levels in the body.

=== Biosynthesis of 20-HETE ===
CYP4F2 along with CYP4A22, CYP4A11, CYP4F3 and CYP2U1 enzymes also metabolize arachidonic acid to 20-hydroxyeicosatetraenoic acid (20-HETE) by an ω-oxidation reaction, with the predominant 20-HETE-synthesizing enzymes in humans being CYP4F2, followed by CYP4A11.

One of the main roles of 20-HETE is to regulate various physiological processes within the body, such as blood flow, vascularization (or angiogenesis, that is the growth of blood vessels), maintenance of proper blood pressure, and kidney tubule absorption of ions in rodents and possibly humans. By controlling blood flow and vascularization, it helps with the formation of new blood vessels when needed. To influence blood pressure levels, it regulates the diameter of blood vessels and constriction or relaxation of smooth muscles that line them. To regulate ion transport and water reabsorption in kidney tubules, it regulates how ions are absorbed or excreted by kidney cells, ultimately impacting electrolyte balance within the bodies. Research on animal models suggests that changes in levels or activity of 20-HETE may be involved in conditions such as hypertension (high blood pressure), renal diseases (kidney disorders), cerebral ischemia (reduced blood flow to the brain), and even cancer progression.

The production and actions of 20-HETE can be influenced by genetic variations known in the CYP4F2 gene. These variations may alter how efficiently arachidonic acid is converted into 20-HETE, affecting its overall impact on bodily functions.

=== Drug metabolism ===
Drug metabolism involves the breakdown and transformation of drugs into their active or inactive forms. The CYP4F2 enzyme regulates the bioactivation of certain drugs.

Specifically, the enzyme regulates the bioactivation of the anti-parasitic drug pafuramidine, a prodrug that requires enzymatic conversion to its bioactive form furamidine. Several studies have identified CYP4F2 as one of the key enzymes responsible for this conversion in human liver microsomes and enteric microsomes. CYP4F2 is also involved in the metabolism of fingolimod, a drug used to treat multiple sclerosis.

== Clinical significance ==
=== Genetic variants ===
Genetic variations in CYP4F2 play a role in physiological processes and health outcomes. Genetic variations in CYP4F2 are considered in personalized treatments related to drug dosages.

Confirmed variations in CYP4F2 are biomarkers for individual differences in response to warfarin—adjusting warfarin dosage based on genetic information has demonstrated a decrease in negative clinical outcomes.

Warfarin dosing algorithms that specifically incorporate the CYP4F2 genetic variants are a subset of the broader range of warfarin dosing algorithms. As of May 2020, 92 out of 433 described warfarin dosing algorithms in the literature included CYP4F2 variants; the other covariates included in these algorithms have been age, concomitant medications, weight, and the variants in the other genes: CYP2C9 and VKORC1.

One specific genetic variant which produces the enzyme with valine residue replaced to methionine residue at position 433 of the protein (V433M substitution), a single-nucleotide polymorphism denoted as CYP4F2*3 (rs2108622), that is present in 28% of global population, leads to reduced enzymatic activity due to decrease in steady-state hepatic concentrations of the enzyme. This variant has a role in eicosanoid and Vitamin E metabolism, in the bioavailability of Vitamin K, in affecting doses of anticoagulants such as warfarin or coumarin, and is also associated with hypertension, with increased risk of cerebral infarction (i.e. ischemic stroke) and myocardial infarction. Individuals who carry this genetic variant, either in heterozygous form (on one chromosome) or homozygous form (on both chromosomes), may have an increased risk of excessive anticoagulation when treated with warfarin, although not all studies confirm this association. This variant accounted for a difference in warfarin dose of approximately 1 mg/day between CC and TT subjects. Most of the studies on warfarin pharmacogenetics, including those involving CYP4F2, have been conducted in European ancestry patients; still, there has been significant activity in developing dosing algorithms for individuals of Asian ancestry.

The CYP4F2 enzyme also regulates the bioactivation of anti-parasitic drug pafuramidine; as such, genetic variations in the CYP4F2 that alter enzyme function can impact the efficacy and safety of these drugs for patients receiving therapy. For example, individuals with a variation that leads to reduced activity of the enzyme may not fully metabolize pafuramidine, leading to lower drug concentrations and reducing its effectiveness against malaria. In contrast, variations associated with increased enzyme activity could result in faster metabolism of pafuramidine and furamidine, leading to higher than expected drug concentrations which may increase the risk of adverse effects.

=== Drug interactions ===
There can be interactions between the drugs that rely on CYP4F2 on their metabolism or bioactivation (e.g., fingolimod, furamidine, warfarin) and the substances that inhibit or induce CYP4F2 expression, such as statins and peroxisome proliferators, 25-hydroxycholesterol, vitamin K, ketoconazole, sesamin, and others. For example, ketoconazole inhibits CYP4F2 and has been observed to increase the plasma concentrations of fingolimod.

=== Biological target ===
CYP4F2, along with the other enzymes that convert arachidonic acid to 20-HETE, can be a drug target in disease-modifying therapy for cancer. 20-HETE is a molecule that affects tumor progression, angiogenesis, and blood pressure regulation in the circulatory system and kidneys. In the tumor microenvironment, proinflammatory cytokines can induce or inhibit CYP4F2 and other enzymes, which can promote carcinogenesis and affect chemotherapy, leading to adverse effects, toxicity, or therapeutic failure. CYP enzymes could be targeted to modify the course of diseases like cancer. Targeting CYPs in preclinical and clinical trials for chemoprevention and chemotherapy has become an effective way to improve antitumor treatment outcomes. Intratumoral CYP enzymes can play a role in the fate of antitumor agents by drug activation or inactivation. Still, they can also provide a mechanism for drug resistance due to their aberrant expression and their supporting roles in tumor progression and metastasis.

== History ==
The CYP4F2 gene was mapped to chromosome 19 in 1997 through analysis of monochromosomal human-rodent cell hybrids. The gene was subsequently isolated and its genomic organization characterized, revealing at least 13 exons with a structure similar to CYP4F3. The CYP4F2 protein was shown to be constitutively expressed in the HepG2 hepatoma cell line and to play a role in inactivating leukotriene B_{4}.

A key functional polymorphism, the V433M substitution (CYP4F2*3, rs2108622), was identified in 2007 with a minor allele frequency of 9-21% in African and European American populations. In vitro assays showed this variant decreased 20-HETE production to 56-66% of normal levels while leaving LTB4 omega-hydroxylation unaffected. The following year, this variant was linked to altered warfarin dose requirements, and subsequent genotyping of 963 individuals across 7 geographic regions confirmed its relevance to warfarin dosing algorithms worldwide. More recently, computational analysis using 14 bioinformatics tools has demonstrated that the V433M substitution reduces protein compactness and stability, altering the overall structural conformation and flexibility of the CYP4F2 enzyme.
