= CYP4F11 =

Protein-coding gene in the species Homo sapiens

Identifiers
- Aliases: CYP4F11, CYPIVF11, cytochrome P450 family 4 subfamily F member 11
- External IDs: OMIM: 611517; MGI: 3645508; GeneCards: CYP4F11
Enzyme activity
EC #	BRENDA	ExPASy	KEGG	MetaCyc
1.14.14.1	↗	↗	↗	↗
1.14.14.78	↗	↗	↗	↗
1.14.14.79	↗	↗	↗	↗
1.14.14.80	↗	↗	↗	↗

Gene location (Human)
Chr.	Chromosome 19 (human)
Band	19p13.12	Start	15,912,367 bp
Band	19p13.12	End	15,934,867 bp

Gene location (Mouse)
Chr.	Chromosome 17 (mouse)
Band	17|17 B1	Start	32,877,874 bp
Band	17|17 B1	End	32,895,888 bp
RNA expression pattern
Bgee	Human / Mouse (ortholog); Top expressed in: right lobe of liver; gallbladder; mucosa of transverse colon; islet of Langerhans; Descending thoracic aorta; mucosa of esophagus; right adrenal cortex; corpus epididymis; ascending aorta; gastric mucosa / Top expressed in: ileum; jejunum; colon; duodenum; morula; testicle; pancreas; blastocyst; placenta; stomach; More reference expression data
BioGPS	n/a
Gene ontology
Molecular function	iron ion binding; oxidoreductase activity; oxidoreductase activity, acting on paired donors, with incorporation or reduction of molecular oxygen, NAD(P)H as one donor, and incorporation of one atom of oxygen; heme binding; oxidoreductase activity, acting on paired donors, with incorporation or reduction of molecular oxygen; metal ion binding; monooxygenase activity; fatty acid binding
Cellular component	integral component of membrane; organelle membrane; endoplasmic reticulum membrane; endoplasmic reticulum; membrane; intracellular membrane-bounded organelle
Biological process	phylloquinone catabolic process; inflammatory response; blood coagulation; vitamin K catabolic process; menaquinone catabolic process; fatty acid metabolic process
Sources:Amigo / QuickGO
Orthologs
Databases	NCBI: entry; OMA: entry
Species	Human	Mouse
Entrez	57834	631304
Ensembl	ENSG00000171903	ENSMUSG00000090700
UniProt	Q9HBI6	G3UW81
RefSeq (mRNA)	NM_001128932; NM_021187	NM_001101588; NM_001368735
RefSeq (protein)	NP_001122404; NP_067010	NP_001095058; NP_001355664
Location (UCSC)	Chr 19: 15.91 – 15.93 Mb	Chr 17: 32.88 – 32.9 Mb
PubMed search
- Wikidata
View/Edit Human	View/Edit Mouse

CYP4F11 (cytochrome P450, family 4, subfamily F, polypeptide 11) is a protein that in humans is encoded by the CYP4F11 gene. This gene encodes a member of the cytochrome P450 superfamily of enzymes. The cytochrome P450 proteins are monooxygenases which catalyze many reactions involved in drug metabolism and synthesis of cholesterol, steroids and other lipids. This gene is part of a cluster of cytochrome P450 genes on chromosome 19. Another member of this family, CYP4F2, is approximately 16 kb away. Alternatively spliced transcript variants encoding the same protein have been found for this gene.

== Expression ==
CYP4F11 is expressed in liver, kidney, heart, brain, and skeletal muscle and is overexpressed in ovarian and colon cancers; perhaps relativant to its overexpression in ovarian cancer, its gene has an estrogen receptor α responsive site in its Promoter (genetics) site.

== Activities and possible functions ==
CYP4F11 is active in metabolism of many drugs including benzphetamine, ethylmorphine, chlorpromazine, imipramine, and erythromycin;.

The cytochrome is also able to hydroxylate short-chain and 3-hydroxylated medium chain fatty acids by attaching a hydroxyl residue to their terminal carbon by omega oxidation in a reaction that may be critical to the processing of these fatty acids. It likewise omega-hydroxylates Vitamin Ks including menaquinone in a metabolic step which is essential for their further metabolism by beta oxidation and probably thereby their removal by catabolism to regulate their tissue levels.

CYP4F11 omega-hydroxylates leukotriene B4 (LTB4) to 20-hydroxy-LTB4, 5-Hydroxyicosatetraenoic acid (5-HETE) to 20-hydroxy-5-HETE (i.e. 5,20-diHETE), 12-hydroxyeicosatetraenoic acid (12-HETE) to 12,20-diHETE, lipoxins and possibly 5-oxo-eicosatetraenoic acid (5-oxo-ETE) to their 20-hydroxy metabolites; these reactions begin the inactivation of these pro- (LTB4, 5-HETE, 12-HETE, and 5-oxo-ETE) and anti- (lipoxins) cell signaling agents; however, it is relatively weak compared to, and therefore possibly not as physiologically relevant as, other CYP4Fs such as CYP4F2, CYP4F3a, CYP4F3b, CYP4A11 and CYP4F2 in doing so. The enzyme also hydroxylates arachidonic acid (i.e. eicosatetraenoic acid to 20-Hydroxyeicosatetraenoic acid) (20-HETE) although other cytochromes such as CYP4A11 and CYP4F2 appear more important in this metabolic conversion. 20-HETE is a short-lived potent signaling agent that functions to regulate blood flow, vascularization, blood pressure, and kidney tubule absorption of ions in rodents and possibly humans. Gene polymorphism variants of CYP4A11 are associated with the development of hypertension and cerebral infarction (i.e. ischemic stroke) in humans (see 20-Hydroxyeicosatetraenoic acid). In spite of its relative impotency and/or importance in accomplishing these omega-hydroxylations, CYP4F11 may contribute to them in certain tissues.
