= Cytochrome P450 omega hydroxylase =

Group of enzymes hydroxylating fatty acids

Cytochrome P450 omega hydroxylases, also termed cytochrome P450 ω-hydroxylases, CYP450 omega hydroxylases, CYP450 ω-hydroxylases, CYP omega hydroxylase, CYP ω-hydroxylases, fatty acid omega hydroxylases, cytochrome P450 monooxygenases, and fatty acid monooxygenases, are a set of cytochrome P450-containing enzymes that catalyze the addition of a hydroxyl residue to a fatty acid substrate. The CYP omega hydroxylases are often referred to as monoxygenases; however, the monooxygenases are CYP450 enzymes that add a hydroxyl group to a wide range of xenobiotic (e.g. drugs, industrial toxins) and naturally occurring endobiotic (e.g. cholesterol) substrates, most of which are not fatty acids. The CYP450 omega hydroxylases are accordingly better viewed as a subset of monooxygenases that have the ability to hydroxylate fatty acids. While once regarded as functioning mainly in the catabolism of dietary fatty acids, the omega oxygenases are now considered critical in the production or break-down of fatty acid-derived mediators which are made by cells and act within their cells of origin as autocrine signaling agents or on nearby cells as paracrine signaling agents to regulate various functions such as blood pressure control and inflammation.

== Action ==
The omega oxygenases metabolize fatty acids (RH) by adding a hydroxyl (OH) to their terminal (i.e. furthest from the fatty acids' carboxy residue) carbons; in the reaction, the two atoms of molecular oxygen(O_{2}[ are reduced to one hydroxyl group and one water (H_{2}O molecule) by the concomitant oxidation of NAD(P)H (see monooxygenase).

RH + O_{2} + NADPH + H^{+} → ROH + H_{2}O + NADP^{+}

== Functions ==
CYP450 enzymes belong to a superfamily which in humans is composed of at least 57 CYPs; within this superfamily, members of six CYP4A subfamilies, (which are CYP4A, CYP4B, CYP4F, CYP4V, CYP4X, and CYP4z) possess ω-hydroxylase activity viz., CYP4A, CYP4B, and CYP4F CYP2U1 also possesses ω hydroxylase activity. These CYP ω-hydroxylases can be categorized into several groups based on their substrates and consequential function

- 1) The only member of the CYP4B subfamily, CYP4B1, shows a preference for ω-oxidizing short-chain fatty acids, i.e. fatty acids that are 7-9 carbons long; CYP4B1 is far more weakly expressed in humans than that expressed in other mammals that were tested. Subsequent to their ω-hydroxylation, these products are converted to their acylcarnitine derivatives and transferred to mitochondria for complete oxidized by beta oxidation (see also omega oxidation).
- 2) A member of the CYP4A subfamily, CYP4A11, preferentially ω-hydroxylate medium-chain fatty acids, i.e. fatty acids that are 10-16 carbons long; CYP4A11, CYP4F2, CYP4F3A, CYP4F3B, CYP4F11, CYP4V2, and CYP4Z1 also metabolize these fatty acids. Subsequent to their ω-hydroxylation, these products are converted to their acylcarnitine derivatives and transferred to mitochondria for complete oxidized by beta oxidation (see also omega oxidation).
- 3) Members of the CYP4F family, i.e. CYPA11, CYP4F2, CYP4F3A, CYP4F3B, and CYP4F11, as well as CYP2U1 ω-hydroxylate long chain fatty acids, i.e. fatty acids that are 18 to 20 carbons long. These hydroxyl fatty acids are then serially metabolized by alcohol dehydrogenase, aldehyde dehydrogenase, and dicarboxylyl CoA synthetase to form their respective Coenzyme A (CoA)-bound dicarboxylic acids and transferred to peroxisomes where they may undergo chain shortening or, as acylcarnitine derivatives or free acids, transferred to mitochondria for complete beta oxidation. The chain-shortened products of peroxisome metabolism may also be converted to phospholipids, triglycerides, and cholesterol esters.
- 4) Members of the CYP4F family, i.e. CYP4F2 and CYP4F3B, ω-hydroxylate very long chain fatty acids, i.e. fatty acids that are 22 to 26 carbons long. These hydroxyl fatty acids are then serially metabolized by alcohol dehydrogenase, aldehyde dehydrogenase, and dicarboxylyl CoA synthetase to form their respective CoA-bound dicarboxylic acids and transferred to peroxisomes where they may undergo chain shortening or, as acylcarnitine derivatives or free acids, transferred to mitochondria for complete beta oxidation. The chain-shortened products of peroxisome metabolism may also be converted to phospholipids, triglycerides, and cholesterol esters.
- 5) CYP4F22 ω-hydroxylates extremely long very long chain fatty acids, i.e. fatty acids that are 28 or more carbons long. The ω-hydroxylation of these special fatty acids is critical to creating and maintaining the skins water barrier function; autosomal recessive inactivating mutations of CYP4F22 are associated with the lamellar ichthyosis subtype of congenital ichthyosiform erythroderma in humans.
- 6) CYP4F2, CYP4F3A, CYP4F3B, and CYP4F11 ω-hydroxylate leukotriene B4 and very probably 5-hydroxyeicosatetraenoic acid and 5-oxo-eicosatetraenoic acid. This hydroxylation greatly reduces the ability of these arachidonic acid metabolites to stimulate cells that mediate inflammation and allergic reactions and may thereby limit and contribute to the resolution of these innate immunity reactions. One or more of these CYPs also omega hydroxylate 12-hydroxyeicosatetraenoic acid, lipoxins, hepoxilins, and acylceramides and may thereby contribute to limiting there biological effects. (However, the 20-hydroxy metabolite of 12-hydroxyeicosatetraenoic acid proved able to contract coronary arteries.)
- 7) CYP4A11, CYP4F2, CYP4F3B, CYP4F11, CYP4F12, CYP4V2, CYP2U1, and possibly CYP4Z1 metabolize arachidonic acid to 20-Hydroxyeicosatetraenoic acid (20-HETE). Animal and human tissue studies suggest that the CYP-dependent production of 20-HETE contributes to the regulation of blood pressure, the growth of certain cancers, and the metabolic syndrome while genetic studies on single nucleotide polymorphism in humans support roles for: a) CYP4F11-dependent 20-HETE production in the prevention of hypertension; b) CYP4F2-dependent 20-HETE production of 20-HETE in the prevention of hypertension, ischemic stroke, and myocardial infarction; and c) CYP2U1 in Hereditary spastic paraplegia, possibly by a 20-HETE-dependent mechanism in a small percentage of patients with this disease (see 20-Hydroxyeicosatetraenoic acid#Human studies). Some or possibly even all of these CYPs may also omega hydroxylate eicosapentaenoic acid (EPA) and docosahexaenoic acid (DHA). 20-hydroxy EPA and 20-hydroxy-DHA do stimulate Peroxisome proliferator-activated receptor alpha but their range of biological activities have yet to be investigated.

== Clinical significance ==
Cytochrome P450 (CYP) ω-hydroxylases are enzymes that play a role in the metabolism of fatty acids and their derivatives. These enzymes add a hydroxyl group to the ω- or (ω-1)-C atom of substrates such as arachidonic acid, docosahexaenoic acid, eicosapentaenoic acid, leukotrienes, and prostaglandins. The metabolites produced by CYP ω-hydroxylases, particularly 20-HETE, have been found to have pleiotropic effects in inflammation and many inflammation-associated diseases. These enzymes are part of the larger family of CYP enzymes that mediate oxidation reactions in the human body. They are mainly expressed in various tissues and organs, including the liver, kidney, lung, endothelial cells, platelets, and immunocytes. The expression levels of CYP ω-hydroxylases can be influenced by gender and inflammatory stimuli.

== Future directions ==
Inflammation-related diseases involve an imbalance between pro-inflammatory and anti-inflammatory mediators. CYP ω-hydroxylase-mediated eicosanoids can function as pro-inflammatory and anti-inflammatory mediators depending on the context. For example, 20-HETE has been shown to promote vascular inflammation by activating endothelial cells and induction of inflammatory cytokines. Up-regulation of CYP ω-hydroxylases may be a pathogenic mechanism in many inflammation-associated diseases. Targeting these enzymes may hold therapeutic potential for treating such conditions.
