= CYP4A22 =

Protein found in humans

Identifiers
- Aliases: CYP4A22, cytochrome P450 family 4 subfamily A member 22
- External IDs: OMIM: 615341; MGI: 3611747; GeneCards: CYP4A22
Enzyme activity
EC #	BRENDA	ExPASy	KEGG	MetaCyc
1.14.14.80	↗	↗	↗	↗

Gene location (Human)
Chr.	Chromosome 1 (human)
Band	1p33	Start	47,137,435 bp
Band	1p33	End	47,149,727 bp

Gene location (Mouse)
Chr.	Chromosome 4 (mouse)
Band	4|4 D1	Start	115,268,821 bp
Band	4|4 D1	End	115,296,231 bp
RNA expression pattern
Bgee	Human / Mouse (ortholog); Top expressed in: right lobe of liver; human kidney; testicle; subcutaneous adipose tissue; right lung; tibial nerve; gastric mucosa; Achilles tendon; olfactory zone of nasal mucosa; lactiferous gland / Top expressed in: renal cortex; right kidney; proximal tubule; hepatobiliary system; liver; human kidney; outer renal medulla; respiratory epithelium; metanephros; nose; More reference expression data
BioGPS	n/a
Gene ontology
Molecular function	iron ion binding; oxidoreductase activity; heme binding; oxidoreductase activity, acting on paired donors, with incorporation or reduction of molecular oxygen; metal ion binding; monooxygenase activity; arachidonic acid omega-hydroxylase activity; laurate hydroxylase activity; 16-hydroxypalmitate dehydrogenase activity
Cellular component	organelle membrane; endoplasmic reticulum membrane; endoplasmic reticulum; membrane; intracellular membrane-bounded organelle; extracellular space; integral component of membrane
Biological process	lipid hydroxylation; omega-hydroxylase P450 pathway
Sources:Amigo / QuickGO
Orthologs
Databases	NCBI: entry; OMA: entry
Species	Human	Mouse
Entrez	284541	13118
Ensembl	ENSG00000162365	ENSMUSG00000078597
UniProt	Q5TCH4	A2A974
RefSeq (mRNA)	NM_001010969; NM_001308102	NM_172306; NM_007821
RefSeq (protein)	NP_001010969; NP_001295031; NP_001295031.1	NP_758510
Location (UCSC)	Chr 1: 47.14 – 47.15 Mb	Chr 4: 115.27 – 115.3 Mb
PubMed search
- Wikidata
View/Edit Human	View/Edit Mouse

CYP4A22 (cytochrome P450, family 4, subfamily A, polypeptide 22) also known as fatty acid omega-hydroxylase is a protein which in humans is encoded by the CYP4A22 gene.

This gene encodes a member of the cytochrome P450 superfamily of enzymes. The cytochrome P450 proteins are monooxygenases which catalyze many reactions involved in drug metabolism and synthesis of cholesterol, steroids and other lipids. This gene is part of a cluster of cytochrome P450 genes on chromosome 1p33.

CYP4A22 was once considered, along with CYP4A11, CYP4F2, and CYP4F3, as active in metabolizing arachidonic acid to 20-hydroxyeicosatetraenoic acid (20-HETE) by an omega oxidation reaction with the predominant 20-HETE-synthesizing enzymes in humans being CYP4F2 followed by CYP4A11; 20-HETE regulates blood flow, vascularization, blood pressure, and kidney tubule absorption of ions in rodents and possibly humans. However, human CYP4A22 is expressed at very low levels in few tissues and may not be a functional enzyme in regard to the metabolism of arachidonic acid to 20-HETE.
