= Leukotriene-B4 20-monooxygenase =

Class of enzymes

Identifiers
- EC no.: 1.14.14.94
- CAS no.: 90119-11-2

Databases
- IntEnz: IntEnz view
- BRENDA: BRENDA entry
- ExPASy: NiceZyme view
- KEGG: KEGG entry
- MetaCyc: metabolic pathway
- PRIAM: profile
- PDB structures: RCSB PDB PDBe PDBsum
- Gene Ontology: AmiGO / QuickGO
Search
- PMC: articles
- PubMed: articles
- NCBI: proteins

Leukotriene-B4 20-monooxygenase (EC 1.14.14.94) is an enzyme that catalyzes the chemical reaction

leukotriene B4
+ NADPH
O_{2} + H^{+}
H_{2}O
20-hydroxy-leukotriene B4
+ NADP^{+}

The four substrates of this enzyme are leukotriene B4, reduced nicotinamide adenine dinucleotide phosphate (NADPH), oxygen and a proton. Its products are 20-hydroxy-leukotriene B4, oxidised NADP^{+}, and water.

This enzyme is a cytochrome P450 omega hydroxylase that uses molecular oxygen as oxidant and incorporates one of its atoms into the starting material. The systematic name of this enzyme class is (6Z,8E,10E,14Z)-(5S,12R)-5,12-dihydroxyicosa-6,8,10,14-tetraenoate,N ADPH:oxygen oxidoreductase (20-hydroxylating). Other names in common use include leukotriene-B4 20-hydroxylase, leucotriene-B4 omega-hydroxylase, LTB4 20-hydroxylase, and LTB4 omega-hydroxylase. It participates in arachidonic acid metabolism and contains heme.
