= C20H32O3 =

The molecular formula C_{20}H_{32}O_{3} (molar mass: 320.473 g/mol) may refer to:

- Epoxyeicosatrienoic acids
- Hydroxyeicosatetraenoic acids
  - 5-Hydroxyeicosatetraenoic acid
  - 12-Hydroxyeicosatetraenoic acid
  - 15-Hydroxyeicosatetraenoic acid
  - 20-Hydroxyeicosatetraenoic acid
  - 19-Hydroxyeicosatetraenoic acid (see 20-Hydroxyeicosatetraenoic acid)
- Isocupressic acid
