= Leukotriene-C4 synthase =

leukotriene-C_{4} synthase
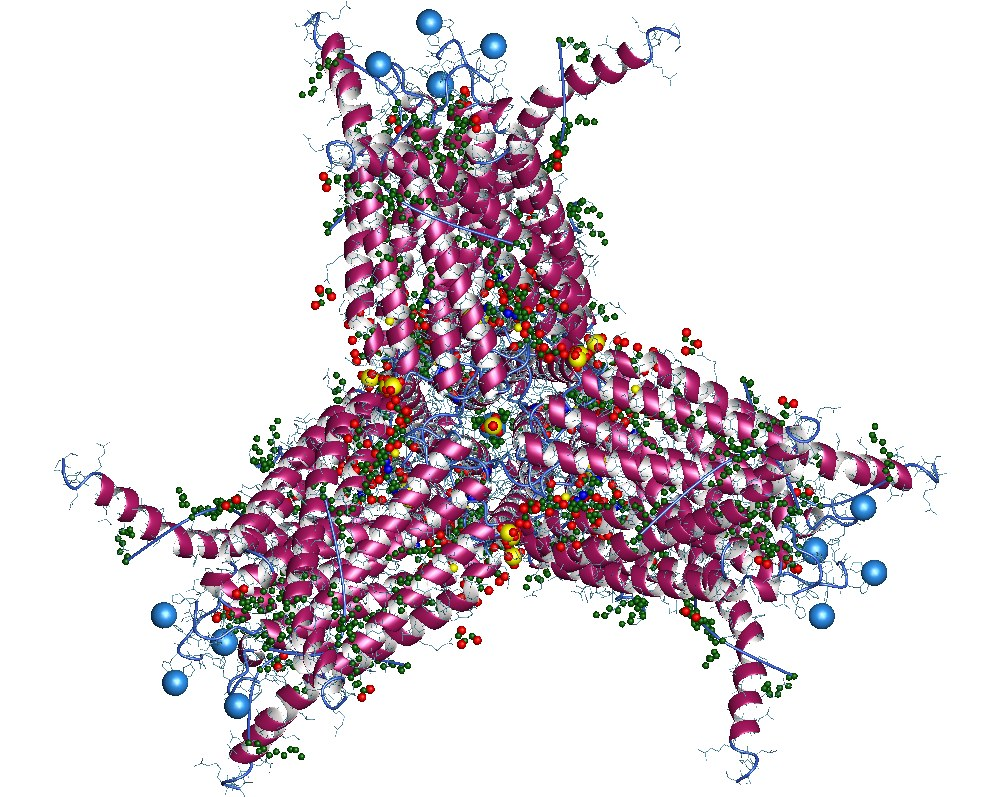
- Leukotriene C_{4} synthase dodecamer, Human

Identifiers
- EC no.: 4.4.1.20
- CAS no.: 90698-32-1

Databases
- IntEnz: IntEnz view
- BRENDA: BRENDA entry
- ExPASy: NiceZyme view
- KEGG: KEGG entry
- MetaCyc: metabolic pathway
- PRIAM: profile
- PDB structures: RCSB PDB PDBe PDBsum
- Gene Ontology: AmiGO / QuickGO
Search
- PMC: articles
- PubMed: articles
- NCBI: proteins

The enzyme leukotriene-C_{4} synthase (EC 4.4.1.20) catalyzes the reaction

leukotriene C_{4} $\rightleftharpoons$ leukotriene A_{4} + glutathione

This enzyme belongs to the family of lyases, specifically the class of carbon-sulfur lyases. The systematic name of this enzyme class is leukotriene-C_{4} glutathione-lyase (leukotriene-A_{4}-forming). Other names in common use include leukotriene C_{4} synthetase, LTC4 synthase, LTC4 synthetase, leukotriene A_{4}:glutathione S-leukotrienyltransferase, (7E,9E,11Z,14Z)-(5S,6R)-5,6-epoxyicosa-7,9,11,14-tetraenoate:glutathione leukotriene-transferase, (epoxide-ring-opening), (7E,9E,11Z,14Z)-(5S,6R)-6-(glutathion-S-yl)-5-hydroxyicosa-7,9,11,14-tetraenoate glutathione-lyase (epoxide-forming). This enzyme participates in arachidonic acid metabolism.

== Structural studies ==
As of late 2007, 3 structures have been solved for this class of enzymes, with PDB accession codes 2PNO, 2UUH, and 2UUI.
