= Pneumocystis pneumonia =

Lung inflammation due to fungal infection

- Other names: Pneumocystis pneumonia; Pneumocystis jirovecii pneumonia; Pneumocystis jiroveci pneumonia; Pneumocystis carinii pneumonia [outdated term]; pneumocystosis; pneumocystiasis; interstitial plasma cell pneumonia; plasma cell pneumonia
- Pneumocystis jirovecii cysts from bronchoalveolar lavage, stained with Toluidine blue O stain
- Specialty: Infectious disease, Pulmonology
- Causes: Pneumocystis jirovecii
- Risk factors: Weakened immune system
- Differential diagnosis: Other types of pneumonia
- Medication: co-trimoxazole, steroids, pentamidine, trimetrexate, dapsone, atovaquone, primaquine, pafuramidine maleate and clindamycin.

Pneumocystis pneumonia (PCP), also known as Pneumocystis jirovecii pneumonia (PJP), is a form of pneumonia that is caused by the yeast-like fungus Pneumocystis jirovecii.

Pneumocystis specimens are commonly found in the lungs of healthy people although it is usually not a cause for disease. However, they are a source of opportunistic infection and can cause lung infections in people with a weak immune system or other predisposing health conditions. PCP is seen in people with HIV/AIDS (who account for 30-40% of PCP cases), those using medications that suppress the immune system, and people with cancer, autoimmune or inflammatory conditions, and chronic lung disease.

== Signs and symptoms ==
Signs and symptoms may develop over several days or weeks and may include: shortness of breath and/or difficulty breathing (of gradual onset), fever, dry/non-productive cough, weight loss, night sweats, chills, and fatigue. Uncommonly, the infection may progress to involve other visceral organs (such as the liver, spleen, and kidney).

- Cough - typically dry/non-productive because sputum becomes too viscous to be coughed up. The dry cough distinguishes PCP from typical pneumonia.

=== Complications ===
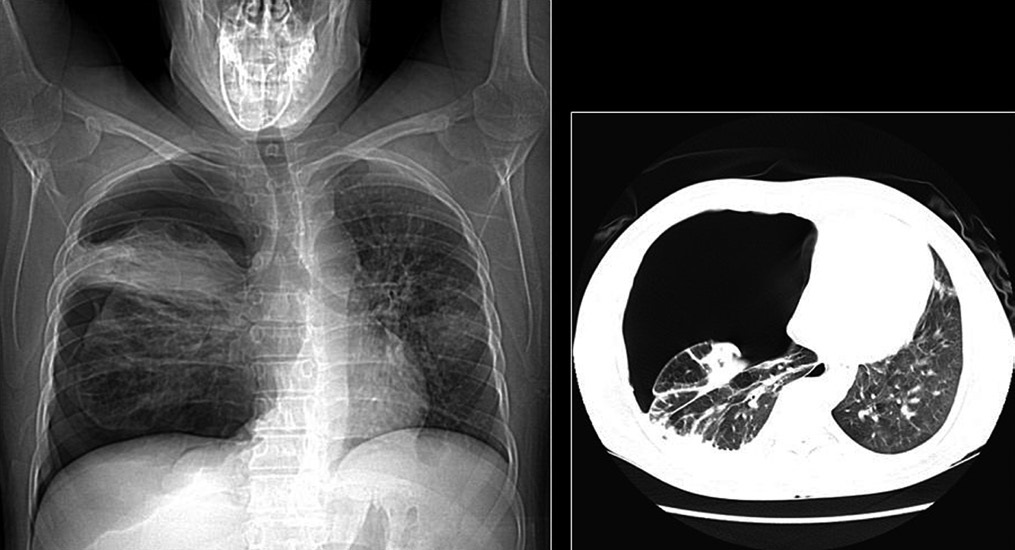
X-ray and CT of ground glass opacities and pneumothorax in pneumocystis pneumonia.

Pneumothorax is a well-known complication of PCP. Also, a condition similar to acute respiratory distress syndrome (ARDS) may occur in patients with severe Pneumocystis pneumonia, and such individuals may require intubation.

== Pathophysiology ==
The risk of PCP increases when CD4-positive T-cell levels are less than 400 cells/μL. In these immunosuppressed individuals, the manifestations of the infection are highly variable. The disease attacks the interstitial, fibrous tissue of the lungs, with marked thickening of the alveolar septa and alveoli, leading to significant hypoxia, which can be fatal if not treated aggressively. In this situation, lactate dehydrogenase levels increase and gas exchange is compromised. Oxygen is less able to diffuse into the blood, leading to hypoxia, which along with high arterial carbon dioxide (CO_{2}) levels, stimulates hyperventilatory effort, thereby causing dyspnea (breathlessness).

In addition, in symptomatic cases of P. jirovecii pneumonia, the overgrowth of the fungus is associated to a co-infection with trichomonads, unicellular flagellated parabasalid protist (Parabasalia) of the family Trichomonadidae. These parasites (including the commensal Trichomonas tenax, Trichomonas vaginalis and Tritrichomonas foetus) exhibit an amoeboid form, without flagellum, which makes it difficult to identify them under the microscope. Amoeboid transformation is an argument in favor of a deleterious action, which nevertheless remains conjectural.

== Diagnosis ==
The diagnosis can be confirmed by the characteristic appearance of the chest X-ray and an arterial oxygen level (PaO_{2}) that is strikingly lower than would be expected from symptoms. Gallium 67 scans are also useful in the diagnosis. They are abnormal in about 90% of cases and are often positive before the chest X-ray becomes abnormal. Chest X-ray typically shows widespread pulmonary infiltrates. CT scan may show pulmonary cysts (not to be confused with the cyst-forms of the pathogen).

Chest X-ray of increased opacification (whiteness) in the lower lungs.

These chest radiographs are of two patients. Both show ground glass opacities. The left X-ray shows a much more subtle ground-glass appearance while the right X-ray shows a much more gross ground-glass appearance mimicking pulmonary edema.

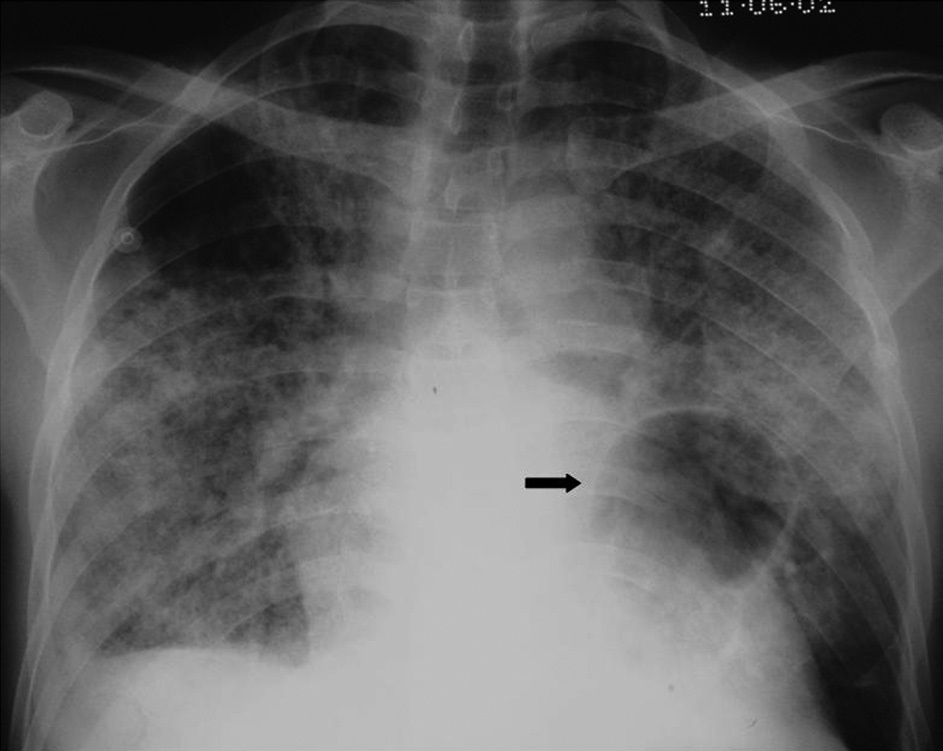
X-ray of a cyst in pneumocystis pneumonia

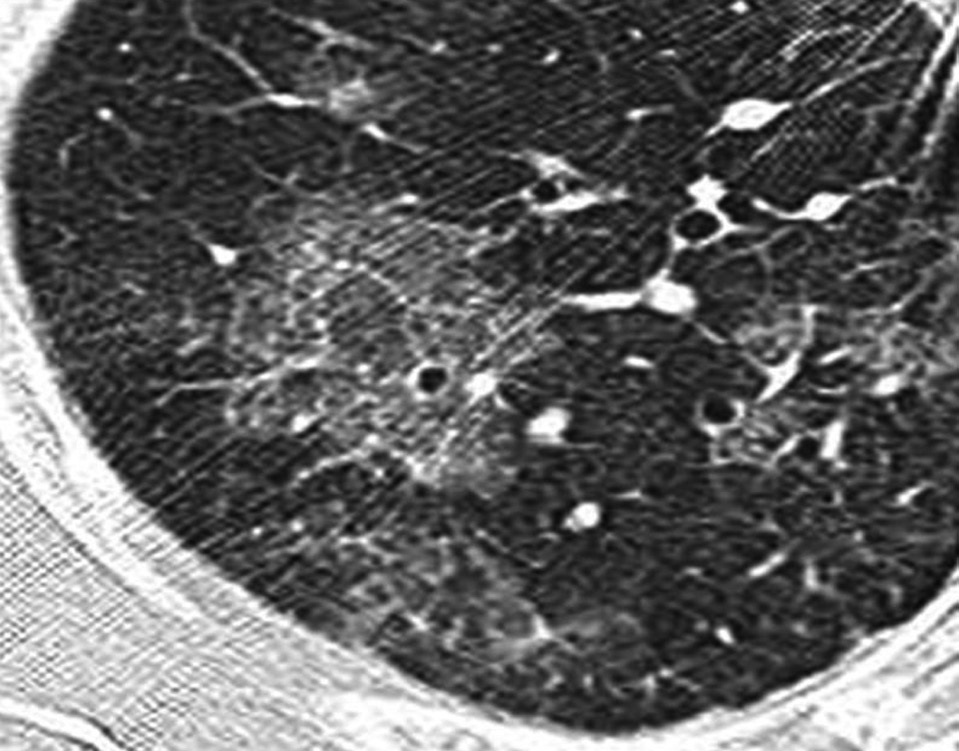
High-resolution computed tomography (HRCT) showing ground-glass attenuation with a geographic or mosaic distribution.

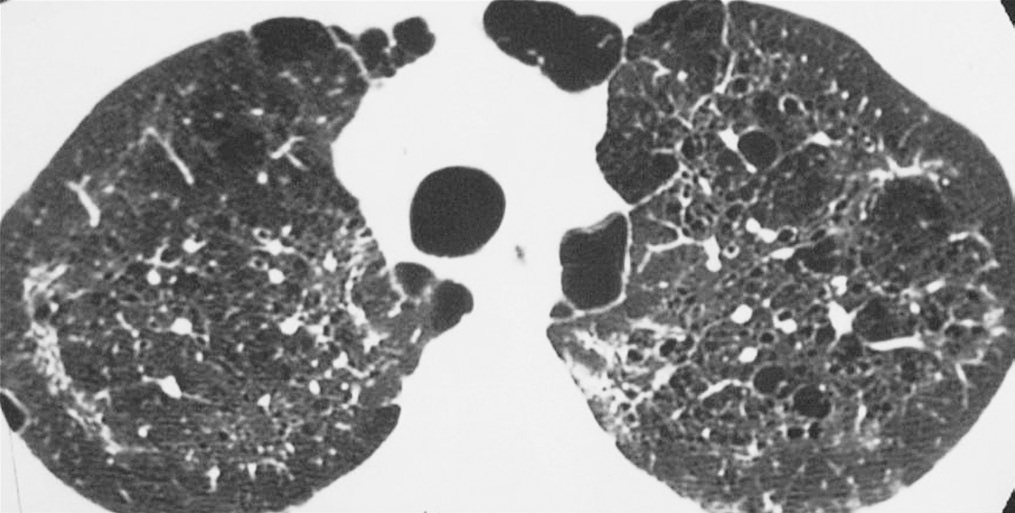
HRCT of cysts of pneumocystis pneumonia. These are usually multiple and bilateral, but range in size, shape and distribution.

The diagnosis can be definitively confirmed by histological identification of the causative organism in sputum or bronchoalveolar lavage (lung rinse). Staining with toluidine blue, silver stain, periodic acid-Schiff stain, or an immunofluorescence assay shows the characteristic cysts. The cysts resemble crushed ping-pong balls and are present in aggregates of two to eight (and not to be confused with Histoplasma or Cryptococcus, which typically do not form aggregates of spores or cells). A lung biopsy would show thickened alveolar septa with fluffy eosinophilic exudate in the alveoli. Both the thickened septa and the fluffy exudate contribute to dysfunctional diffusion capacity that is characteristic of this pneumonia.

Pneumocystis infection can also be diagnosed by immunofluorescent or histochemical staining of the specimen, and more recently by molecular analysis of polymerase chain reaction products comparing DNA samples. Notably, simple molecular detection of P. jirovecii in lung fluids does not mean that a person has PCP or infection by HIV. The fungus appears to be present in healthy individuals in the general population. A blood test to detect β-D-glucan (a part of the cell wall of many different types of fungi) can also help in the diagnosis of PCP.

== Prevention ==
In immunocompromised people, prophylaxis with co-trimoxazole (trimethoprim/sulfamethoxazole), atovaquone, or regular pentamidine inhalations may help prevent PCP.

== Treatment ==
Antipneumocystic medication is used with concomitant steroids to avoid inflammation, which causes an exacerbation of symptoms about 4 days after treatment begins if steroids are not used. By far, the most commonly used medication is trimethoprim/sulfamethoxazole, but patients are often unable to tolerate this treatment due to adverse reactions, especially if they are HIV positive. Other medications that are used, alone or in combination, include pentamidine, trimetrexate, dapsone, atovaquone, primaquine, pafuramidine maleate (under investigation), and clindamycin. Treatment is usually for a period of about 21 days. Pentamidine is less often used, as its major limitation is the high frequency of side effects. These include acute pancreatic inflammation, kidney failure, liver toxicity, decreased white blood cell count, rash, fever, and low blood sugar.

== Epidemiology ==
=== Current epidemiology ===
Pneumocystis jirovecii

The disease PCP is relatively rare in people with normal immune systems, but common among people with weakened immune systems, such as premature or severely malnourished children, the elderly, and especially persons living with HIV/AIDS (in whom it is most commonly observed). PCP can also develop in patients who are taking immunosuppressive medications. It can occur in patients who have undergone solid organ transplantation or bone marrow transplantation and after surgery. Infections with Pneumocystis pneumonia are also common in infants with hyper IgM syndrome, an X-linked or autosomal recessive trait.

The causative organism of PCP is distributed worldwide and Pneumocystis pneumonia has been described in all continents except Antarctica. More than 75% of children are seropositive by the age of four, which suggests a high background exposure to the organism. A post mortem study conducted in Chile of 96 persons who died of unrelated causes (suicide, traffic accidents, and so forth) found that 65 (68%) of them had pneumocystis in their lungs, which suggests that asymptomatic pneumocystis infection is extremely common. Up to 20% of adults may be asymptomatic carriers at any given time, and asymptomatic infection may persist for months before being cleared by an immune response.

P. jirovecii is commonly believed to be a commensal organism (dependent upon its human host for survival). The possibility of person-to-person transmission has recently gained credence, with supporting evidence coming from many different genotyping studies of P. jirovecii isolates from human lung tissue. For example, in one outbreak of 12 cases among transplant patients in Leiden, it was suggested as likely, but not proven, that human-to-human spread may have occurred.

==== PCP and AIDS ====
Since the start of the AIDS epidemic, PCP has been closely associated with AIDS. Because it only occurs in an immunocompromised host, it may be the first clue to a new AIDS diagnosis if the patient has no other reason to be immunocompromised (e.g. taking immunosuppressive drugs for organ transplant). An unusual rise in the number of PCP cases in North America, noticed when physicians began requesting large quantities of the rarely used antibiotic pentamidine, was the first clue to the existence of AIDS in the early 1980s.

Prior to the development of more effective treatments, PCP was a common and rapid cause of death in persons living with AIDS. Much of the incidence of PCP has been reduced by instituting a standard practice of using oral co-trimoxazole (Bactrim / Septra) to prevent the disease in people with CD4 counts less than 200/μL. In populations who do not have access to preventive treatment, PCP continues to be a major cause of death in AIDS.

== History ==
The first cases of Pneumocystis pneumonia were described in premature infants in Europe following the Second World War. At the time the disease was referred to as plasma cellular interstitial pneumonitis of the newborn.

Before the detection of HIV/AIDS in humans and the advent of clinical transplant immunology, and widespread immunomodulatory therapy for autoimmune diseases, the neonatal and infantile population was the principal immunity-limited population. A 1955 review article stated, "Interstitial plasma cell pneumonia is a type of infantile pneumonia, occurring chiefly in Europe." It also stated, "The etiology is unknown, but the disease acts like an infection in its epidemiology. No present-day therapeutic measures seem to be of any definite value."

== Nomenclature ==
Both Pneumocystis pneumonia and pneumocystis pneumonia are orthographically correct; one uses the genus name per se and the other uses the common noun based on it. (This is the same reason, for example, why "group A Streptococcus" and "group A streptococcus" are both valid.) Synonyms for PCP include pneumocystosis (pneumocystis + -osis), pneumocystiasis (pneumocystis + -iasis), and interstitial plasma cell pneumonia.

The older species name Pneumocystis carinii (which now applies only to the Pneumocystis species that is found in rats) is still in common usage. As a result, Pneumocystis pneumonia (PCP) is also known as Pneumocystis jiroveci[i] pneumonia and (incorrectly) as Pneumocystis carinii pneumonia.

Regarding nomenclature, when the name of Pneumocystis pneumonia (PCP) changed from P. carinii pneumonia to P. jirovecii pneumonia, it was at first asked whether "PJP" should replace "PCP". However, because the short name "PCP" was already well established among physicians that managed patients with Pneumocystis infection, it was widely accepted that this name could continue to be used, as it could now stand for pneumocystis pneumonia.
