= Omega oxidation =

Metabolic process in some animals

Omega oxidation (ω-oxidation) is a process of fatty acid metabolism in some species of animals. It is an alternative pathway to beta oxidation that, instead of involving the β carbon, involves the oxidation of the ω carbon (the carbon most distant from the carboxyl group of the fatty acid). The process is normally a minor catabolic pathway for medium-chain fatty acids (10-12 carbon atoms), but becomes more important when β oxidation is defective.

In vertebrates, the enzymes for ω oxidation are located in the smooth ER of liver and kidney cells, instead of in the mitochondria as with β oxidation. The steps of the process are as follows:

Reaction type	Enzyme	Description	Reaction
Hydroxylation	mixed function oxidase	The first step introduces a hydroxyl group onto the ω carbon. The oxygen for the group comes from molecular oxygen in a complex reaction conduced by certain members of the CYP4A and CYP4F subfamilies viz., CYP4A11, CYP4F2, and CYP4F3 or by two other CYP450 enzymes, CYP2U1 and CYP4Z1, that involves cytochrome P450 and the electron donor NADPH (see Cytochrome P450 omega hydroxylase).	
Oxidation	alcohol dehydrogenase	The next step is the oxidation of the hydroxyl group to an aldehyde by NAD^{+}.	
Oxidation	aldehyde dehydrogenase	The third step is the oxidation of the aldehyde group to a carboxylic acid by NAD^{+}. The product of this step is a fatty acid with a carboxyl group at each end.	

After these three steps, either end of the fatty acid can be attached to coenzyme A. The molecule can then enter the mitochondrion and undergo β oxidation. The final products after successive oxidations include succinic acid, which can enter the citric acid cycle, and adipic acid.

The first step in ω-oxidation, i.e. addition of a hydroxy residue to the omega carbon of short, intermediate, and long chain unsaturated or saturated fatty acids, can serve to produce or inactivate signaling molecules. In humans, a subset of Cytochrome P450 (CYP450) microsome-bound ω-hydroxylases (termed Cytochrome P450 omega hydroxylases) metabolize arachidonic acid (also known as eicosatetraenoic acid) to 20-hydroxyeicosatetraenoic acid (20-HETE). 20-HETE possesses a range of activities in animal and cellular model systems, e.g. it constricts blood vessels, alters the kidney's reabsorption of salt and water, and promotes the growth of cancer cells; genetic studies in humans suggest that 20-HETE contributes to hypertension, myocardial infarction, and brain stroke (see 20-Hydroxyeicosatetraenoic acid). Among the CYP450 superfamily, members of the CYP4A and CYP4F subfamilies viz., CYP4A11, CYP4F2, CYP4F3, are considered the predominant cytochrome P450 enzymes responsible in most tissues for forming 20-HETE. CYP2U1 and CYP4Z1 contribute to 20-HETE production in a more limited range of tissues. The cytochrome ω-oxidases including those belonging to the CYP4A and CYP4F sub-families and CYPU21 also ω-hydroxylate and thereby reduce the activity of various fatty acid metabolites of arachidonic acid including LTB4, 5-HETE, 5-oxo-eicosatetraenoic acid, 12-HETE, and several prostaglandins that are involved in regulating various inflammatory, vascular, and other responses in animals and humans. This hydroxylation-induced inactivation may underlie the proposed roles of the cytochromes in dampening inflammatory responses and the reported associations of certain CYP4F2 and CYP4F3 single nucleotide variants with human Crohn's disease and Celiac disease, respectively.

== See also ==
- Beta oxidation
- Alpha oxidation
