= 20-Hydroxyeicosatetraenoic acid =

Names
- Preferred IUPAC name (5Z,8Z,11Z,14Z)-20-Hydroxyicosa-5,8,11,14-tetraenoic acid
- Other names 20-HETE, 20-Hydroxy-5,8,11,14-eicosatetraenoic, 20-Hydroxyeicosatetraenoic acid

Identifiers
CAS Number	79551-86-3
3D model (JSmol)	Interactive image
ChEBI	CHEBI:34306
ChemSpider	4446281
IUPHAR/BPS	4103
KEGG	C14748
MeSH	acid 20-hydroxy-5,8,11,14-eicosatetraenoic acid
PubChem CID	5283157
CompTox Dashboard (EPA)	DTXSID601009895
- InChI: Key: NNDIXBJHNLFJJP-DTLRTWKJSA-N; InChI=1S/C20H32O3/c21-19-17-15-13-11-9-7-5-3-1-2-4-6-8-10-12-14-16-18-20(22)23/h1,3-4,6-7,9-10,12,21H,2,5,8,11,13-19H2,(H,22,23)/b3-1-,6-4-,9-7-,12-10-
- SMILES: C(CC/C=C\C/C=C\C/C=C\C/C=C\CCCC(=O)O)CCO

Properties
Chemical formula	C_{20}H_{32}O_{3}
Molar mass	320.473 g·mol^{−1}
- Except where otherwise noted, data are given for materials in their standard state (at 25 °C [77 °F], 100 kPa). Infobox references

20-Hydroxyeicosatetraenoic acid, also known as 20-HETE or 20-hydroxy-5Z,8Z,11Z,14Z-eicosatetraenoic acid, is an eicosanoid metabolite of arachidonic acid that has a wide range of effects on the vascular system including the regulation of vascular tone, blood flow to specific organs, sodium and fluid transport in the kidney, and vascular pathway remodeling. These vascular and kidney effects of 20-HETE have been shown to be responsible for regulating blood pressure and blood flow to specific organs in rodents; genetic and preclinical studies suggest that 20-HETE may similarly regulate blood pressure and contribute to the development of stroke and heart attacks. Additionally the loss of its production appears to be one cause of the human neurological disease, hereditary spastic paraplegia. Preclinical studies also suggest that the overproduction of 20-HETE may contribute to the progression of certain human cancers, particularly those of the breast.

== Biosynthesis ==
=== Production in humans ===
A subset of cytochrome P450 (CYP450) microsome-bound ω-hydroxylases, the cytochrome P450 omega hydroxylases, metabolize arachidonic acid to 20-HETE by an omega oxidation reaction. CYP450 enzymes belong to a superfamily which in humans is composed of at least 57 members and in mice at least 120 members. Among this superfamily, certain members of the CYP4A and CYP4F subfamilies in the CYP4 family are considered predominant cytochrome P450 enzymes that are responsible in most tissues for forming 20-HETE and, concurrently, smaller amounts of 19-hydroxy-5Z,8Z,11Z,14Z-eicosatetraenoic acid (19-HETE). However, CYP2U1 may also contribute to the production of these two HETEs and CYP4F8 can metabolize arachidonic acid to 19-HETE while forming little or no 20-HETE.

The production of 19-HETE with 20-HETE may be significant since 19(R)-HETE, although not its stereoisomer, 19(S)-HETE, inhibits the action of 20-HETE on vascular endothelial cells. Based on studies analyzing the production of other HETEs by CYP enzymes, the production of 19-HETE by these enzymes may include both its R and S stereoisomers.

In humans, the CYP4 ω-hydroxylases include CYP4A11, CYP4F2, and CYP4F3 with the predominant 20-HETE-synthesizing enzymes being CYP4F2, which is the major 20-HETE producing enzyme in the human kidney, followed by CYP4A11. CYP4F3 is expressed as two distinct enzymes, CYP4F3A and CYP4F3B, due to alternative splicing of a single pre-mRNA precursor molecule; CYP4F3A is mostly expressed in leukocytes, CYP4F3B mostly in the liver. Human CYP4Z1, which is expressed in a limited range of tissues such as human breast and ovary, may also metabolize arachidonic acid to 20-HETE while human CYP4A22, once considered as contributing to 20-HETE production, is now regarded as being metabolically inactive. Finally, CYP2U1, the only member of the human CYP2U subfamily, is highly expressed in brain and thymus and to lesser extents in numerous other tissues such as kidney, lung and heart. CYP2U1 protein is also highly expressed, compared to several other cytochrome P450 enzymes, in malignant breast tissue; the MCF-7 human breast cancer cell line express messenger RNA for this cytochrome.

=== Production by rodents and other animals ===
In mice, the only 20-HETE- and 19-HETE-producing enzymes of the Cyp4a subfamily are two extensively homologous ones, Cyp4a12a and Cyp4a12b; Cyp4a12a is expressed in the male kidney in an androgen hormone-dependent manner. In rats, Cyp4a1, Cyp4a2, Cyp4a3, and Cyp4a8 make 20-HETE. The tissue distribution of these enzymes differs from those of humans making extrapolations from rodent studies to humans somewhat complicated.

Mouse CYP2J9, rat CYP2J3, and sheep CYP2J metabolize arachidonic acid primarily to 19-HETE but also to smaller amounts of 20-HETE, and, in the case of the sheep enzyme, 18-HETE; human CYP2J2, however, is an epoxygenase, metabolizing arachidonic acid to epoxide products.

=== Factors regulating 20-HETE production ===
Many agents stimulate cells and tissues to produce 20-HETE in vitro and in vivo. Androgens are particularly potent stimulators of this production. Other stimulators include the powerful vasoconstriction-inducing agents, angiotensin II, endothelins, and alpha adrenergic compounds (e.g. norepinephrine).

Nitric oxide, carbon monoxide, and superoxide inhibit 20-HETE production; these non-pharmacological agents do so by binding to the Heme binding site of the 20-HETE producing cytochrome p450 enzymes. Drugs that are substrates for the UDP-glucuronosyltransferase (UGT) enzymes which metabolize 20-HETE such as non-steroidal anti-inflammatory agents, opioids, gemfibrozil, Lasix, propanol, and various COX-2 inhibitors may act as perhaps unwanted side effects to increase the levels of 20-HETE. There are a variety of pharmacological agents which inhibit the synthesis of 20-HETE including various fatty acid analogs that compete reversibly with arachidonic acid for the substrate binding site in the CYP enzymes and benzene-based drugs.

=== Proviso on 20-HETE production ===
The cytochrome ω-oxidases including those belonging to the CYP4A and CYP4F sub-families and CYPU21 hydroxylate not only arachidonic acid but also various shorter chain (e.g. lauric acid) and/or longer chain (e.g. docosahexaenoic acid) fatty acids. They can also ω-hydroxylate and thereby reduce the activity of various fatty acid metabolites (e.g. LTB4, 5-HETE, 5-oxo-eicosatetraenoic acid, 12-HETE, and several prostaglandins) that regulate inflammation, vascular responses, and other reactions. This metabolism-induced inactivation may underlie the proposed roles of the cytochromes in dampening inflammatory responses and the reported associations of certain CYP4F2 and CYP4F3 single nucleotide variants with human Krohn's disease and Coeliac disease, respectively. While many of the effects and diseases associated with the over- or under-expression, pharmacological inhibition, and single nucleotide or mutant variants of the cytochrome ω-hydroxylases have been attributed to their impact on 20-HETE production, the influence of these alternate metabolic actions have frequently not been defined.

== Metabolism ==
Glucuronidation of 20-HETE by UDP-glucuronosyltransferases (UGTs) is thought to be a primary pathway of 20-HETE elimination and thereby inactivation in humans.

There are several other pathways that metabolize 20-HETE. Human platelets and other tissues metabolize it via cyclooxygenase(s) to form the 20-hydroxy analogs of prostaglandin G2, thromboxane A2, thromboxane B2 and to 11(R)-hydroperoxy-20-hydroxy-5Z,8Z,11Z,14Z-eicosatetraenoic acid which is rapidly reduced to 11,20-dihydroxy-5Z,8Z,11Z,14Z-eicosatetraenoic acid; they also metabolize it through 12-lipoxygenase to form 12(S)-hydroperoxy-20-hydroxy-5Z,8Z,101E,14Z-eicosatetraenoic acid which is also rapidly reduced to 12,20-dihydroxy-5Z,8Z,101E,14Z-eicosatetraenoic acid. (The chirality of the hydroperoxy and hydroxyl residues at positions 11 and 12 in the eicosatetraenoic acids are predicted based on studies defining the chirality of the arachidonic metabolites made by these enzymes.) Since the prostaglandin and thromboxane metabolites of 20-HETE lack the platelet-stimulating activities to their prostaglandin and thromboxane precursors and since the 12-hydroxy and 11-hydroxy metabolites of 20-HETE may also be inactive, these metabolic pathways appear to function in inactivating 20-HETE with respect to the platelet system. However, the 20-hydroxy prostaglandin metabolites are able to contract rat aorta rings and thereby could contribute to the hypertensive actions of 20-HETE.

Cultured smooth muscle and endothelial cells from mouse brain microvasculature oxidize 20-HETE to its 20-carboxy analog, 20-carboxy- 5Z,8Z,11Z,14Z-eicosatetraenoic acid, then to 18-carboxy-5Z,8Z,10Z,14Z-octadecatetraenoic acid, and then to the further chain-shortened dicarboxylic acid, 16-carboxy-5Z,8Z,10E-hexadecatrrenoic acid, in a series of Beta oxidation reactions. These shortening pathways also are likely to serve in inactivating 20-HETE, although the initial product of this shortening pathway, 20-carboxy-HETE, dilates coronary microvessels in the pig heart and thereby could serve to antagonize the vasoconstrictor actions of 20-HETE, at least in this organ and species. Coronary artery endothelial cells isolated from pigs incorporate 20-HETE primarily into the sn-2 position of phospholipids through a coenzyme A-dependent process. It is likely, although not yet shown, that these mouse and pig 20-HETE metabolizing pathways also occur in humans.

== Tissue distribution of 20-HETE-producing enzymes and/or activity ==
20-HETE-synthesizing enzymes are widely distributed to liver, kidney, brain, lung, intestine and blood vessels. In most vascular systems, 20-HETE synthesizing activity is limited to vascular smooth muscle of small blood vessels with little or no such activity in the vessel's endothelial cells or in large blood vessels. However, both the smooth muscle and endothelial cells obtained from mouse brain microvasculature, produce 20-HETE in culture.

20-HETE is produced by human neutrophils and platelets and by the ascending tubule cells in the medulla as well the pre-glomerular arterioles and certain other localized areas of the rabbit kidney.

== Vascular-related activities ==
=== Rodent studies ===
==== Blood vessel contraction ====
In various rodent models, 20-HETE, at low concentrations (<50 nanomolar), acts to constrict arteries by sensitizing (i.e. increasing) the contraction responses of these artery's smooth muscle cells to other contracting agents such as alpha adrenergic agonists, vasopressin, endothelin, and a product of renin angiotensin system, angiotensin II. 20-HETE has a particularly complex interaction with the renin angiotensin system: angiotensin II stimulates the preglomerular microvessels of the rat kidney to produce 20-HETE; this production is required for angiotensin II to exert its full constrictor effects; and 20-HETE induces transcription of the enzyme which converts angiotensin I to angiotensin II, i.e. angiotensin-converting enzyme. Other agents such as Androgens and alpha adrenergic compounds such as norepinephrine. likewise stimulate 20-HETE production and have vasoconstrictive actions which are enhanced by 20-HETE. These circular or positive feedback interactions may serve to perpetuate vasoconstrictor responses.

Again in rodent models, 20-HETE acts to block Calcium-activated potassium channels to promote the entry of ionic calcium into vascular smooth muscle cells through the L-type calcium channel; the attendant rise in intracellular calcium triggers these muscles to contract.

Studies in rats also indicate that in vascular endothelial cells 20-HETE inhibits the association of the nitric oxide-producing enzyme, endothelial nitric oxide synthase (eNOS) with heat shock protein 90; this inhibits the ability of eNOS to become activated. The endothelial cells become dysfunctional in exhibiting decreased ability to produce the vasodilating agent, nitric oxide, and in containing elevated levels of a potentially injurious oxygen radical, superoxide anion; the blood vessels to which these dysfunctional endothelial cells belong are less able to dilate in response to the vasodilator, acetylcholine.

20-HETE can also constrict rodent (and human) artery preparations by directly activating the receptor for thromboxane A2. While significantly less potent than thromboxane A2 in activating this receptor, studies on rat and human cerebral artery preparations indicate that increased blood flow through these arteries triggers production of 20-HETE which in turn binds to thromboxane receptors to constrict these vessels and thereby reduce their blood blow. Acting in the latter capacity, 20-HETE, it is proposed, functions as a mediator regulating blood flow to the brain.

These vasoconstrictor effects of 20-HETE can reduce blood flow to specific parts of the body, not only to brain (see previous paragraph) but also to kidney, liver, heart and other organs, as well as to portions of these organs; they can also contribute to systemic hypertension as well as to the physiological and pathological effects of thromboxane receptor-activation .

==== Blood vessel injury ====
Sprague Dawley rats that underwent balloon injury of the common carotid artery exhibited elevated levels of CYP4A enzyme immunostaining in the smooth muscle of the injured arteries as well as elevated levels of 20-HETE in the injured arteries. Inhibition of 20-HETE production by two different agents greatly reduced the vascular intima hyperplasia and vascular remodeling that occurred after balloon injury. The studies suggest that the increase in expression of CYP4A and production of 20-HETE contribute to vascular intima growth, remolding, and thereby healing of injured rat carotid arteries.

==== Blood vessel thrombosis ====
In the C57BL/6 mouse laboratory model, 20-HETE pretreatment accelerates the development of thrombosis and reduces blood flow caused by the thrombosis-inducing agent, ferric chloride, in the common carotid and femoral arteries; companion studies on human umbilical vein endothelial cells indicate that 20-HETE stimulates the activation of extracellular signal-regulated kinases to cause ERK-dependent and L-type calcium channel-dependent release of von Willebrand factor which in turn stimulates the adhesion of platelets to the endothelial cells. The endothelial, platelet, and pro-clotting actions of 20-HETE may contribute to its ability to disrupt blood flood to tissues.

==== Renal absorption ====
In animal models, 20-HETE stimulates the activation of protein kinase C in the epithelial cells of the proximal tubules of the kidney; the kinase then phosphorylates and thereby inhibits the Na+/K+-ATPase and concurrently also blocks the Na-K-Cl cotransporter and 70 pS K+ channel in the thick Ascending limb of loop of Henle (TALH); these effects reduce the absorption of sodium and fluids in the nephron and thereby tend to reduce blood pressure.

==== Hypertension ====
As indicated above, 20-HETE may raise blood pressure by constricting arterial blood vessels but also may lower blood pressure by promoting the loss of sodium and fluids in the kidneys. The effects of 20-HETE therefore are complex, as indicated in studies of the following animal models. Many of these models appear relevant to hypertension in humans in that they parallel the human disease, i.e. men have higher rates of hypertension than women, and women with increased levels of androgens (e.g. postmenopausal women and women with polycystic ovarian disease) and higher rates of hypertension.

===== Spontaneously hypertensive model =====
Spontaneously hypertensive rats exhibit elevated levels of CYP4A2 and 20-HETE; blockade of 20-HETE production lowers blood pressure in this model. The effect is particularly well seen in female rats: aging post-menopausal but not pre-menopausal female spontaneously hypertensive rats exhibit highly significant falls in blood pressure when treated with non-selective or selective inhibitors of CYP-induced 20-HETE production.

===== Salt-sensitive hypertension models =====
Dahl salt-sensitive rats develop hypertension that develops more quickly and exacerbated by high intake of salt (sodium chloride) and ameliorated by low salt intake. In this model, rats exhibit an up-regulated CYP4A/20-HETE pathway within their cerebral vasculature and vascular endothelial cell overproduction of reactive oxygen species that in turn stimulates the CYp4A/20-HETE pathway. Non-selective and non-selective inhibitors of CYP4A and 20-HETE production reduce hypertension in this model. The hypertension in this model is more severe in male rats and appears to be mediated at least in part by vasopressin, the renin-angiotensin system, and androgens.

Lewis rats (see Laboratory rat models) that had one kidney removed and then fed a high salt diet are hypertensive. Kidney medullary interstitial infusion of an inhibitor of 20-HETE production reduced the formation of 20-HETE in the outer medulla of the infused kidney, had no effect on the production of 20-HETE in the cortex of the infused kidney, and produced a mean arterial pressure rise from 115 at baseline to 142 mm of mercury; this study indicates that the hypertensive versus hypotensive effects of 20-HETE depend not only on the organ of its production but also, with respect to the kidney, the site within the organ where it is produced.

===== Androgen-induced hypertensive model =====
Androgen treatment causes hypertension in normal male and female rats; this hypertensive response is greatly reduced by diverse inhibitors of Cyp4a and 20-HETE production.

===== Genetically engineered models of hypertension =====
Cyp4a12-transgenic mice overexpressing Cyp4a12 develop androgen-independent hypertension that is associated with increased levels of 20-HETE; this hypertension is fully reversible by treatment with a Cyp4a selective inhibitor of 20-HETE production.

Mice depleted of Cyp4a14 by gene knockout (Cyp4a14(-/-) mice develop male-specific, androgen-dependent hypertension. This seemingly paradoxical result is due to the overexpression of Cyp4a12a; the knockout of Cyp4a14 (Cyp4a14 does not produce 20-HETE) leads to the overexpression of the 20-HETE-producing cytochrome, Cyp4a149(-/-), and consequent overproduction of 20-HETE. The model involves increased plasma androgens, increased vascular and urinary levels of 20-HETE, relief of hypertension by castration, and hypertension which is driven by excessive fluid reabsorption in the kidney's proximal tubule secondary to the overexpression of Sodium–hydrogen antiporter 3; these effects are presumed but not yet shown to be due to the overproduction of 20-HETE. The Cyp4a12-transgenic model (above) is referred to in support of this presumption.

Mice depleted of Cyp4a10 maintain normal blood pressure on a low salt diet but become hypertensive on normal or high salt diets; this paradoxical result appears due to a decrease in kidney levels of Cyp2C44 caused by the loss of Cyp4a10. Cyp2C44 metabolizes arachidonic acid a family of vasodilation-inducing and anti-hypertensive products, the Epoxyeicosatrienoic acids (EETs). The model involves normal levels of 20-HETE, reduced expression of Cyp2c44, reduced levels of EETs, and deficiencies in kidney tubule absorption of sodium regulated by EETs, and the normalization of hypertensive blood pressure by increasing expression of Cyp2c44 by treating the mice with an inducer of its expression, an activator of PPARα.

== Other activities ==
20-HETE activates the mouse and human transient receptor potential cation channel subfamily V member 1 (TRPV1, also known as the capsaicin receptor and the vanilloid receptor 1), and through this receptor, cultured dorsal root ganglion cells taken from mice.

== Human studies ==
=== Genetic studies ===
==== CYP4A11 polymorphism ====
Human CYP4A11 has 72.69% amino acid identity with murine cyp4a14 and 73.02% identity with murine cyp4a10 suggesting that it plays a role in humans similar to that of cyp4a14 and/or cyp4a10 in mice. The association of hypertension with defective CYP4A11 in humans as indicated below seems to parallel the hypertension associated with Cyp4a14 gene knockout in mice (see above section on genetic models).

The gene polymorphism rs1126742 variant of CYP4A11 switches thymidine to cytosine at nucleotide 8590 [T8590C] and leads to a phenylalanine-to-serine substitution at amino acid 434); this F434S variant has significantly reduced ability to ω-oxidize arachidonic acid to 20-HETE and has been associated with essential hypertension in: 512 white males from Tennessee (Odds ratio=2.31); 1538 males and females from the Framingham Heart Study (Odds ratio=1.23); males but not females in 732 black Americans with hypertensive renal disease participating in the African American Study of Kidney Disease; males in a sample of 507 individuals in Japan and in the third MONICA (MONitoring trends and determinants In Cardiovascular disease survey of 1397 individuals the homozygous C8590C genotype to the homozygous T8590T genotype with odds ratios of 3.31 for all subjects, 4.30 for males 2.93 for women);

A study of 1501 participants recruited from the Tanno-Sobetsu Study found that the variant -845G in the promoter region of CYP411 (−845A is the predominant genotype) is associated with reduced transcription of CYP411 as well as with hypertension (odds ratio of homozygous and heterozygous -845G genotype versus homozygous -845A was 1.42);

A haplotype tagging single-nucleotide polymorphism (SNP) (see Tag SNP) variant of CYP4A11, C296T (cytosine to thymine at position 296), was associated with a significantly increased risk of ischemic stroke (adjusted odds ratio of 1.50 in comparing homozygous and heterozygous C296T subjects to homozygous C286C subjects) in >2000 individuals taken from the Han Chinese population. The effect of the −296C>T single base pair substitution on baseline CYP411 transcriptional activity was not significant, suggesting that this polymorphism may not be the causal variant but instead may be in linkage disequilibrium with the causal variant. Regardless, this SNP may serve as a genetic marker for large vessel disease stroke risk in this population.

==== CYP4F2 polymorphism ====
The T allele at rs2108622, which has been designated as CYP4F2*3 in the Human CYP Allele Nomenclature Database by the Pharmacogene Variation Consortium, produces the CYP4F2 enzyme with methionine residue instead of valine at position 433 (the Val433Met variant), a single-nucleotide polymorphism (1347C>T; NM_001082.5:c.1297G>A; p. Val433Met; rs2108622). This variant of the CYP4F2 enzyme has reduced capacity to metabolize arachidonic acid to 20-HETE but increased urinary excretion of 20-HETE. Studies found that: a) among 161 hypertensive and 74 normotensive subjects in Australia, the incidence of the Val433Met variant was significantly increased in the hypertensive subjects; b) among a large number of Swedish patients enrolled and monitored over 10 years in the cardiovascular cohort of the Malmö Diet and Cancer Study only males with this variant exhibited hypertension; c) among several hundred subjects in India, the variant was associated with hypertension; and d) in comparing 249 patients with hypertension to 238 age-matched controls in Japan, the variant was not associated with hypertension. The maintenance of the lower blood pressure that followed diet-induced weight loss was more difficult for carriers of the Val433Met variant and may be related to increased arterial stiffness and increased 20-HETE synthesis.

The Val433Met variant is also associated with an increased incidence of cerebral infarction (i.e. ischemic stroke) in a study of 175 subjects with infarction compared to 246 control subjects in Japan, in 507 stroke patients compared to 487 age- and sex-matched 487 controls in India, and in males but not females in a study of 558 patients compared to 557 controls in China. The variant is associated with myocardial infarction in a study of 507 patients compared to 487 age- and sex-matched controls in India, in males but not females in a study of 234 patients compared to 248 control subjects in Japan, and in male but not female patients in Sweden enrolled in the cardiovascular cohort of the Malmo Diet and Cancer Study. The incidence of cerebral and myocardial infarction in these studies appears to be independent of hypertension. (The platelets of individuals heterozygous or homozygous for the Val433Met variant exhibit increased platelet aggregation responses to epinephrine. This platelet hyper-responsiveness to epinephrine, particularly if also exhibited to other platelet-aggregating agents, could contribute to cerebral and coronary infarctions.)

The Single-nucleotide polymorphism rs1558139 guanine to cytosine variant in an intron of CYP4F2 is associated with essential hypertension in men only in a study of 249 hypertensive versus 238 age-matched controls in Japan. The impact of this variant on CYP4F2 expression is not known.

Researchers have identified at least 3 more single-nucleotide polymorphisms of CYP4F2 (2024C>G P85A; 80 C>T A27V rs771576634; 139C>T R47C rs115517770) which may affect conversion of arachidonic acid to HETE-20.

==== CYP2U1 mutations ====
A mutation (c.947A>T) in CYP2U1 has been associated with a small number of patients with Hereditary spastic paraplegia in that it segregates with the disease at the homozygous state in two afflicted families. The mutation affects an amino acid (p.Asp316Val) highly conserved among CYP2U1 orthologs as well as other cytochrome P450 proteins; the p.Asp314Val mutation is located in the enzyme's functional domain, is predicted to be damaging to the enzyme's activity, and is associated with mitochondria dysfunction. A second homozygous enzyme-disabling mutation has been identified in CYP2U1, c.1A>C/p.Met1?, that is associated with <1% of hereditary spastic paraplegia sufferers. While the role of 20-HETE in these mutations has not been established, the reduction in 20-HETE production and thereby 20-HETE's activation of the TRPV1 receptor in nerve tissues, it is hypothesized, may contribute to the disease.

=== Cancer ===
==== Breast cancer ====
Two human breast cancer cell lines, T47D and BT-474, made to overexpress CYP4Z1 by transfection overexpress messenger RNA for and overproduce vascular endothelial growth factor A while under expressing message and protein for tissue inhibitor of metalloproteinase-2. T47D cells that overexpress CYP4Z1 also overproduce 20-HETE and when transplanted into athymic Balb/c mice show a greater increase in tumor weight and vascularity compared to control T47D cells; these increases are prevented by an inhibitor of 20-HETE production. Isoliquiritigenin, a proposed drug for treating cancer, cause cultured MDA-MB-231 and MCF-7 human breast cancer cells to die by triggering apoptosis. Among its many other effects, the drug caused these cells to decrease their levels of 20-HETE in vitro; the addition of 20-HETE to these cultures rescued the cells from apoptosis. Isoliquiritigenin also inhibits the in vivo lung metastasis of MDA-MB-231 cell transplants while concurrently decreasing the tumor's levels of 20-HETE. The growth of MDA-MB-231 cells implanted into athymic nude female mice as well as the cells' production of a large variety of agents stimulating vascularization including vascular endothelial growth factor were inhibited by treating the mice with an inhibitor of 20-HETE production.

Messenger RNAs not only for CYP4Z2 but also for CYP4A11, CYP4A22, CYP4F2, and CYP4F3 are more highly expressed in samples of human breast cancer tumors compared to normal breast tissue. The Three prime untranslated regions (3'UTRs) of the CYP4Z1 gene and its Pseudogene, CYP4Z2P, share several miRNA-binding sites, including those for miR-211, miR-125a-3p, miR-197, miR-1226, and miR-204'. Since these miRNA's reduce the translation of CYP4Z1, the expression of CYP4Z2P can bind these miRNAs to reduce their interference with CYP4Z1 and thereby increase the production of CYP4Z1 protein and perhaps 20-HETE; indeed, force expression of these 3'UTRs promoted in vitro tumor angiogenesis in breast cancer cells partly via miRNA-dependent activation of the phosphoinositide 3-kinase-MAPK/ERK pathway and thereby stimulating the production of vascular endothelium growth factor and possibly other endothelium growth factors. Taken together, these pre-clinical studies suggest that 20-HETE made by one or more of the cited cytochrome P450 enzymes may contribute to the progression of breast cancer by promoting its survival, growth, and vascular endothelial growth factor-induced neovascularization.

==== Other cancers ====
20-HETE stimulated the proliferation of cultured human brain Glioma cell line U251 and, when forced to overexpress CYP4Z1 by gene transfection, overproduced 20-HETE and exhibited a dramatically increased rate of growth that was blocked by inhibiting the cells from producing 20-HETE. A similar set of findings was found with human non-small cell lung cancer cells. A selective inhibitor of 20-HETE synthesis and a 20-HETE antagonist reduced the growth of two human kidney cancer 786-O and 769-P cell lines in culture; the 20-HETE antagonist also inhibited the growth of 786-O cells transplanted into athymic nude mice.

Messenger RNAs for CYP4A11, CYP4A22, CYP4F2, and/or CYP4F3 are more highly expressed in ovary, colon, thyroid, lung, ovary, cancers compared to their normal tissue counterparts; in ovarian cancer, this higher expression is associated with an increased level of CYP4F2 protein expression and an increased ability to metabolize arachidonic acid to 20-HETE. Ovarian cancers also overexpress CYP4Z1 mRNA protein; this overexpression is associated with a poorer disease outcome.

While these studies suggest that CYP4A11, CYP4A22, CYP4F2, and/or CYP4F3 produce 20-HETE which in turn promotes the growth of the cited cancers in model systems and therefore may do so in the human cancers, this suggestion clearly needs much further study. For example, an inhibitor of 20-HETE production blocks the growth of human brain U251 glioma cells in culture; since these cells could not be shown to produce 20-HETE, it was proposed that some other metabolite may by the inhibitor's targeted cytochrome enzymes was responsible for maintaining these cells growth. It is also possible that any such inhibitor has off-target effects that are responsible for its actions.

=== Platelet aggregation ===
20-HETE inhibits the aggregation of human platelets by competing with arachidonic acid for the enzymes that produce prostaglandin H2 and thromboxane A2. These products are formed in response to platelet stimulation and then act through the thromboxane receptor to mediate and/or promote the ensuing platelet aggregation response to most stimuli. The platelets metabolize 20-HETE to the 20-hydroxy analogs of prostaglandin H2 and thromboxane A2, products that are essentially inactive in platelets, while consequently form less of the arachidonic acid-derived prostaglandin and thromboxane products. In addition, 20-HETE itself blocks prostaglandin and thromboxane metabolites from interacting with the thromboxane receptor. Both effects, i.e. replacement of prostaglandin and thromboxane production with platelet-inactive products and thromboxane A2 receptor blockade, are responsible for 20-HETE's platelet aggregation-inhibiting action. However, the platelet anti-aggregating activity of 20-HETE requires micromolar levels and therefore may be more of a pharmacological than physiological activity.

=== Vasculature ===
20-HETE constricts human artery preparations by directly activating the receptor for thromboxane A2. While significantly less potent than thromboxane A2 in activating this receptor, studies on human cerebral artery preparations indicate that increased blood flow through these arteries triggers production of 20-HETE which in turn binds to thromboxane receptors to constrict these vessels and thereby reduce their blood blow. Acting in the latter capacity, 20-HETE, it is proposed, functions as a mediator regulating blood flow to the human brain.

=== Metabolic syndrome ===
One study found that 30 patients with the metabolic syndrome exhibited significantly elevated levels of plasma and urinary 20-HETE compared to matched controls; women with the syndrome had particularly higher urinary 20-HETE levels.
