= Pafuramidine =

Names
- IUPAC name N′-Methoxy-4-[5-[4-[(Z)-N′-methoxycarbamimidoyl]phenyl]furan-2-yl] benzenecarboximidamide
- Other names DB289

Identifiers
CAS Number	186953-56-0; 837369-26-3 (maleate)
3D model (JSmol)	Interactive image
ChEMBL	ChEMBL319669
ChemSpider	4586633
PubChem CID	5480200
UNII	H1VG379J2X; K27F04K3A9 (maleate)
CompTox Dashboard (EPA)	DTXSID10870377
- InChI: InChI=1S/C20H20N4O3/c1-25-23-19(21)15-7-3-13(4-8-15)17-11-12-18(27-17)14-5-9-16(10-6-14)20(22)24-26-2/h3-12H,1-2H3,(H2,21,23)(H2,22,24) Key: UKOQVLAXCBRRGH-UHFFFAOYSA-N; InChI=1/C20H20N4O3/c1-25-23-19(21)15-7-3-13(4-8-15)17-11-12-18(27-17)14-5-9-16(10-6-14)20(22)24-26-2/h3-12H,1-2H3,(H2,21,23)(H2,22,24) Key: UKOQVLAXCBRRGH-UHFFFAOYAE
- SMILES: CO/N=C(\N)/C1=CC=C(C=C1)C2=CC=C(O2)C3=CC=C(C=C3)/C(=N/OC)/N

Properties
Chemical formula	C_{20}H_{20}N_{4}O_{3}
Molar mass	364.405 g·mol^{−1}

Pharmacology
Routes of administration	Oral
Legal status	Investigational
- Except where otherwise noted, data are given for materials in their standard state (at 25 °C [77 °F], 100 kPa). Infobox references

Pafuramidine (formulated as the maleic acid salt pafuramidine maleate) is an experimental drug for the treatment of pneumocystis pneumonia (PCP). In 2006, pafuramidine was given orphan drug status by the US Food and Drug Administration for PCP in patients with HIV/AIDS. Preliminary clinical trials indicated that pafuramide was effective against pneumocystis pneumonia and had the potential for fewer side effects than the standard treatment with trimethoprim/sulfamethoxazole (TMP-SMX).

Pafuramidine also reached Phase III clinical trials for the treatment of first stage African sleeping sickness, but development was halted in 2008 over concerns about kidney toxicity.
