= VKORC1 =

Protein-coding gene in the species Homo sapiens

Identifiers
- Aliases: VKORC1, EDTP308, IMAGE3455200, MST134, MST576, VKCFD2, VKOR, vitamin K epoxide reductase complex subunit 1
- External IDs: OMIM: 608547; MGI: 106442; GeneCards: VKORC1
Enzyme activity
EC #	BRENDA	ExPASy	KEGG	MetaCyc
1.17.4.4	↗	↗	↗	↗

Gene location (Human)
Chr.	Chromosome 16 (human)
Band	16p11.2	Start	31,090,842 bp
Band	16p11.2	End	31,095,980 bp

Gene location (Mouse)
Chr.	Chromosome 7 (mouse)
Band	7 F3|7 69.81 cM	Start	127,492,235 bp
Band	7 F3|7 69.81 cM	End	127,494,789 bp
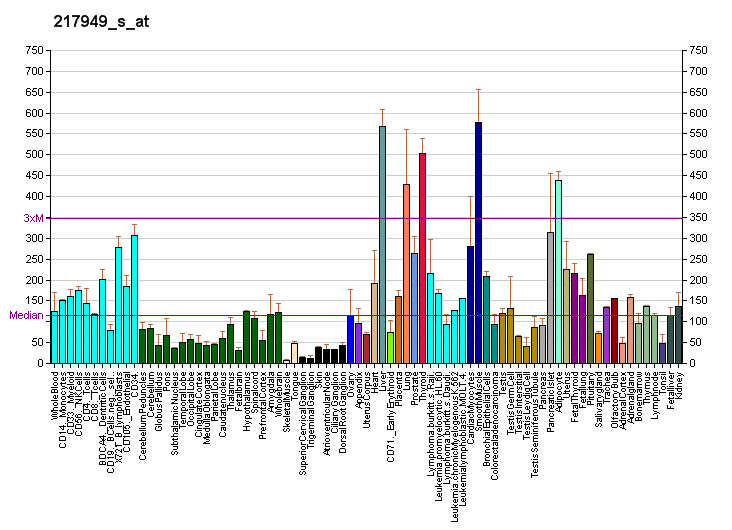
RNA expression pattern
Bgee	Human / Mouse (ortholog); Top expressed in: stromal cell of endometrium; right lobe of liver; thoracic aorta; ascending aorta; Descending thoracic aorta; right coronary artery; body of pancreas; left coronary artery; right ovary; pituitary gland / Top expressed in: primary oocyte; secondary oocyte; zygote; islet of Langerhans; yolk sac; urinary bladder; liver; right kidney; proximal tubule; white adipose tissue; More reference expression data
BioGPS	More reference expression data
Gene ontology
Molecular function	oxidoreductase activity; vitamin-K-epoxide reductase (warfarin-sensitive) activity; quinone binding; vitamin-K-epoxide reductase (warfarin-insensitive) activity
Cellular component	integral component of membrane; endoplasmic reticulum membrane; membrane; endoplasmic reticulum; intracellular membrane-bounded organelle
Biological process	peptidyl-glutamic acid carboxylation; blood coagulation; bone development; vitamin K metabolic process; response to organonitrogen compound; response to organic cyclic compound; regulation of blood coagulation; response to antibiotic
Sources:Amigo / QuickGO
Orthologs
Databases	NCBI: entry; OMA: entry
Species	Human	Mouse
Entrez	79001	27973
Ensembl	ENSG00000167397	ENSMUSG00000096145
UniProt	Q9BQB6	Q9CRC0
RefSeq (mRNA)	NM_001311311; NM_024006; NM_206824	NM_178600
RefSeq (protein)	NP_001298240; NP_076869; NP_996560	NP_848715
Location (UCSC)	Chr 16: 31.09 – 31.1 Mb	Chr 7: 127.49 – 127.49 Mb
PubMed search
- Wikidata
View/Edit Human	View/Edit Mouse

Vitamin K epOxide Reductase Complex subunit 1 (VKORC) is an enzyme that in humans is encoded by the VKORC1 gene. This enzymatic protein complex is responsible for reducing vitamin K 2,3-epoxide to its active form, which is important for effective clotting (coagulation). In humans, mutations in this gene can be associated with deficiencies in vitamin-K-dependent clotting factors.

== Gene ==
The human gene is located on chromosome 16. Two pseudogenes have been identified on chromosome 1 and the X chromosome.

== Structure ==
VKORC1 is a 163 amino acid integral membrane protein associated with the endoplasmic reticulum and VKORC1 mRNA is broadly expressed in many different tissues.

== Function ==
The VKORC1 protein is a key enzyme in the vitamin K cycle. VKORC1 is involved in the vitamin K cycle by reduction of vitamin K epoxide to vitamin K, which is the rate-limiting step in the physiological process of vitamin K recycling. The availability of reduced vitamin K is of importance for activation vitamin K 2,3-epoxide. The reduction of vitamin K epoxide is then responsible for the carboxylation of glutamic acid residues in some blood-clotting proteins, including factor VII, factor IX, and factor X. VKORC1 is of therapeutic interest both for its role in contributing to high interpatient variability in coumarin anticoagulant dose requirements and as a potential player in vitamin K deficiency disorders.

== Clinical relevance ==
=== Clotting ===
In humans, mutations in this gene are associated with deficiencies in vitamin-K-dependent clotting factors. Fatal bleeding (internal) and hemorrhage can result from a decreased ability to form clots.

The product of the VKORC1 gene encodes a subunit of the enzyme that is responsible for reducing vitamin K 2,3-epoxide to the activated form. A genetic polymorphism on the VKORC1 gene results alter substrate stereo-selectivity (contributing to warfarin resistance) and VKORC1 activity (such as warfarin metabolism).

Warfarin is an anticoagulant that opposes the procoagulant effect of vitamin K by inhibiting the VKORC enzyme. A patient's VKORC1 genotype will dictate the optimal dosage of warfarin as mutations in the VKORC1 gene can be associated with decreased enzymatic activity resulting in higher warfarin concentrations. Genetic testing can reveal the presence of the genetic mutation and FDA recommends lower starting doses of warfarin in these patients.

The prevalence of these variants also varies by race, with 90–95% of Asians, 37% of Caucasians and 14% of Africans carrying the A allele. The end result is a decreased amount of clotting factors and therefore, a decreased ability to clot. These isoform mutations are rare except in Ethiopian and Ashkenazi Jewish populations.

=== Warfarin ===
Warfarin is a commonly prescribed oral anticoagulant, or blood thinner used to treat blood clots such as deep vein thrombosis and pulmonary embolism and to prevent stroke in people who have atrial fibrillation, valvular heart disease or artificial heart valves. Warfarin causes inhibition on VKORC1 activities and leads to a reduced amount of vitamin K available to serve as a cofactor for clotting proteins. Inappropriate dosing of warfarin has been associated with a substantial risk of both major and minor hemorrhage. As the pharmacological target of warfarin, VKORC1 is considered a candidate gene for the variability in warfarin response. Previous researches have shown that the CYP2C9 genotype of patients also played a role in warfarin metabolism and response.
