= Hydroxyeicosatetraenoic acid =

Hydroxyeicosatetraenoic acid may refer to:

- 5-Hydroxyeicosatetraenoic acid
- 12-Hydroxyeicosatetraenoic acid (12-HETE)
- 15-Hydroxyeicosatetraenoic acid
- 20-Hydroxyeicosatetraenoic acid (20-HETE)
- 19-Hydroxyeicosatetraenoic acid (see 20-Hydroxyeicosatetraenoic acid)
