= CYP4F3 =

Protein-coding gene in the species Homo sapiens

Identifiers
- Aliases: CYP4F3, CPF3, CYP4F, LTB4H, cytochrome P450 family 4 subfamily F member 3, CYPIVF3
- External IDs: OMIM: 601270; MGI: 2158641; GeneCards: CYP4F3
Enzyme activity
EC #	BRENDA	ExPASy	KEGG	MetaCyc
1.14.14.1	↗	↗	↗	↗
1.14.14.79	↗	↗	↗	↗
1.14.14.94	↗	↗	↗	↗

Gene location (Human)
Chr.	Chromosome 19 (human)
Band	19p13.12	Start	15,640,897 bp
Band	19p13.12	End	15,662,825 bp

Gene location (Mouse)
Chr.	Chromosome 17 (mouse)
Band	17|17 B1	Start	33,143,662 bp
Band	17|17 B1	End	33,166,376 bp
RNA expression pattern
Bgee	Human / Mouse (ortholog); Top expressed in: right lobe of liver; trabecular bone; blood; bone marrow; kidney tubule; bone marrow cell; metanephric glomerulus; jejunal mucosa; gallbladder; human kidney / Top expressed in: granulocyte; neural layer of retina; right kidney; yolk sac; duodenum; muscle of thigh; jejunum; left lobe of liver; lip; proximal tubule; More reference expression data
BioGPS	n/a
Gene ontology
Molecular function	iron ion binding; alpha-tocopherol omega-hydroxylase activity; tocopherol omega-hydroxylase activity; metal ion binding; monooxygenase activity; heme binding; oxidoreductase activity, acting on paired donors, with incorporation or reduction of molecular oxygen; oxidoreductase activity; 20-hydroxy-leukotriene B4 omega oxidase activity; leukotriene-B4 20-monooxygenase activity; 20-aldehyde-leukotriene B4 20-monooxygenase activity
Cellular component	integral component of membrane; organelle membrane; endoplasmic reticulum membrane; membrane; intracellular membrane-bounded organelle; endoplasmic reticulum
Biological process	leukotriene metabolic process; lipid metabolism; icosanoid metabolic process; leukotriene B4 catabolic process
Sources:Amigo / QuickGO
Orthologs
Databases	NCBI: entry; OMA: entry
Species	Human	Mouse
Entrez	4051	170716
Ensembl	ENSG00000186529	ENSMUSG00000024055
UniProt	Q08477	n/a
RefSeq (mRNA)	NM_000896; NM_001199208; NM_001199209; NM_001369696	NM_130882
RefSeq (protein)	NP_000887; NP_001186137; NP_001186138; NP_001356625	n/a
Location (UCSC)	Chr 19: 15.64 – 15.66 Mb	Chr 17: 33.14 – 33.17 Mb
PubMed search
- Wikidata
View/Edit Human	View/Edit Mouse

Cytochrome P450 4F3, also leukotriene-B(4) omega-hydroxylase 2, is an enzyme that in humans is encoded by the CYP4F3 gene. CYP4F3 encodes two distinct enzymes, CYP4F3A and CYP4F3B, which originate from the alternative splicing of a single pre-mRNA precursor molecule; selection of either isoform is tissue-specific with CYP3F3A being expressed mostly in leukocytes and CYP4F3B mostly in the liver.

== Function ==
The cytochrome P450 proteins are monooxygenases which catalyze many reactions involved in drug metabolism and synthesis of cholesterol, steroids, fatty acids and other lipids. CYP4F3 actually encodes two splice-variants, CYP4F3A and CYP4F3B, of the cytochrome P450 superfamily of enzymes. The gene is part of a cluster of cytochrome P450 genes on chromosome 19. Another member of this family, CYP4F8, is approximately 18 kb away. Both variants localize on the endoplasmic reticulum and metabolize leukotriene B4 and very likely 5-hydroxyeicosatetraenoic acid, 5-oxo-eicosatetraenoic acid, and 12-hydroxyeicosatetraenoic acid by an omega oxidation reaction, i.e. by adding a hydroxyl residue to their terminal (i.e. C-20) carbon. This addition starts the process of inactivating and degrading all of these well-known mediators of inflammation CYP3FA is the major enzyme accomplishing these omega oxidations in leukocytes.

CYP4F3A and/or CYP43FB also omega oxidize arachidonic acid to 20-hydroxyeicosatetraenoic acid (20-HETE) as well as epoxyeicosatrienoic acids (EETs) to 20-hydroxy-EETs. 20-HETE regulates blood flow, vascularization, blood pressure, and kidney tubule absorption of ions in rodents and possibly humans; it has also been proposed to be involved in regulating the growth of various types of human cancers (see 20-Hydroxyeicosatetraenoic acid § Cancer). EETs have a similar set of regulatory functions but often act in a manner opposite to 20-HETE (see Epoxyeicosatrienoic acid § Cancer); since, however, the activities of the 20-HEETs have not been well-defined, the function of EET omega oxidation is unclear.

== Genetic variants ==
The hydroxylation-induced inactivation of the mediators of inflammation, perhaps particularly of leukotriene B4, may underlie the proposed roles of these cytochromes in dampening inflammatory responses as well as the reported associations of certain CYP4F3 single nucleotide variants (SNPs) with human Crohn's disease (SNPs are designated rs1290617 and rs1290620 and celiac disease (rs1290622 and rs1290625).

There is also a study that have found an association within Guangzhou population between the single nucleotide variation rs3794987 and susceptibility to the SARS-CoV-1 virus, discovered in 2003. The GG/AG genotype was associated with an increased susceptibility to SARS-CoV-1, comparing to the AA genotype. However, the results of this association were not replicated in another study, on the Beijing population. The combined analysis of the two studies does not show any association of the CYP4F3 SNPs analyzed with SARS-CoV-1 susceptibility.
