= CYP4A11 =

Protein-coding gene in humans

Identifiers
- Aliases: CYP4A11, CP4Y, CYP4A2, CYP4AII, cytochrome P450 family 4 subfamily A member 11, CYPIVA11
- External IDs: OMIM: 601310; MGI: 88611; GeneCards: CYP4A11
Enzyme activity
EC #	BRENDA	ExPASy	KEGG	MetaCyc
1.14.14.1	↗	↗	↗	↗
1.14.14.80	↗	↗	↗	↗

Gene location (Human)
Chr.	Chromosome 1 (human)
Band	1p33	Start	46,929,177 bp
Band	1p33	End	46,941,484 bp

Gene location (Mouse)
Chr.	Chromosome 4 (mouse)
Band	4 D1|4 53.05 cM	Start	115,375,461 bp
Band	4 D1|4 53.05 cM	End	115,390,846 bp
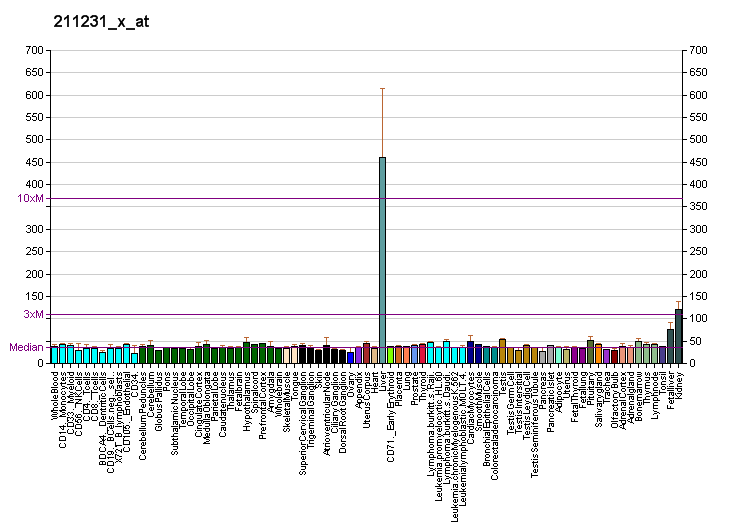

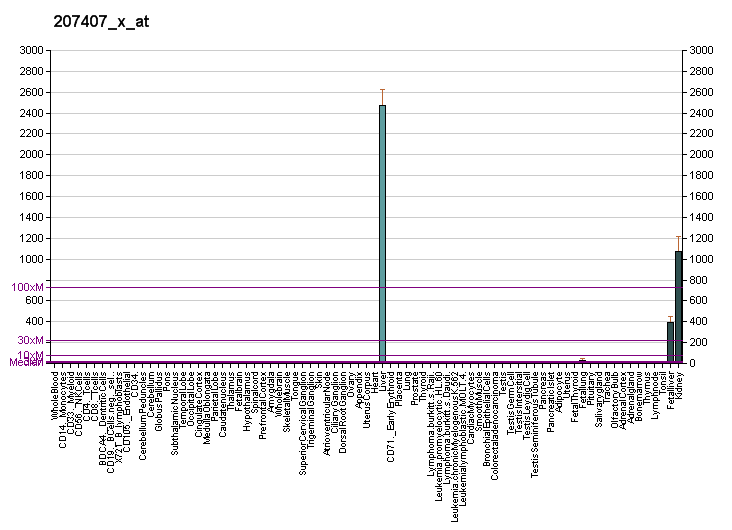

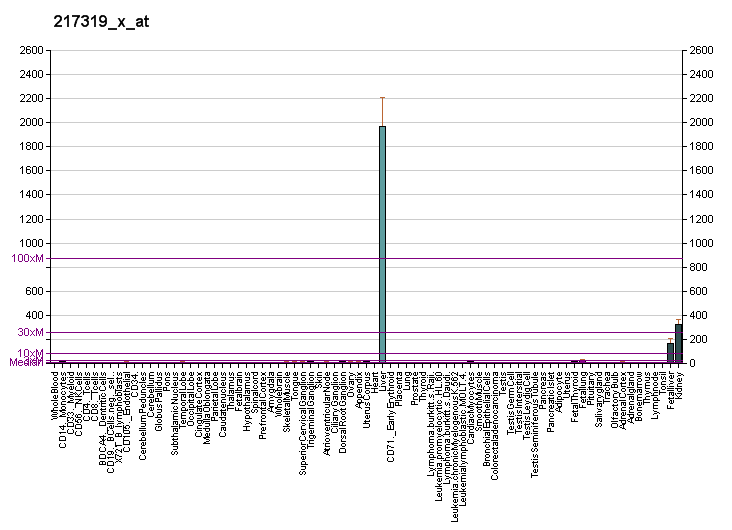
RNA expression pattern
Bgee	Human / Mouse (ortholog); Top expressed in: right lobe of liver; Achilles tendon; sural nerve; human kidney; gonad; renal cortex; duodenum; gallbladder; subcutaneous adipose tissue; superior frontal gyrus / Top expressed in: left lobe of liver; right kidney; human kidney; gallbladder; proximal tubule; duodenum; sexually immature organism; primary visual cortex; muscle of thigh; embryo; More reference expression data
BioGPS	More reference expression data
Gene ontology
Molecular function	iron ion binding; leukotriene-B4 20-monooxygenase activity; arachidonic acid epoxygenase activity; metal ion binding; alkane 1-monooxygenase activity; heme binding; oxidoreductase activity, acting on paired donors, with incorporation or reduction of molecular oxygen; oxidoreductase activity; monooxygenase activity
Cellular component	cytoplasm; organelle membrane; endoplasmic reticulum membrane; intracellular membrane-bounded organelle; membrane; apical plasma membrane; endoplasmic reticulum
Biological process	leukotriene metabolic process; epoxygenase P450 pathway; fatty acid metabolic process; pressure natriuresis; omega-hydroxylase P450 pathway; renal water homeostasis; positive regulation of icosanoid secretion; sodium ion homeostasis; long-chain fatty acid metabolic process; leukotriene B4 catabolic process; arachidonic acid metabolic process; regulation of lipid metabolic process
Sources:Amigo / QuickGO
Orthologs
Databases	NCBI: entry; OMA: entry
Species	Human	Mouse
Entrez	1579	13117
Ensembl	ENSG00000187048	ENSMUSG00000066072
UniProt	Q02928	O88833
RefSeq (mRNA)	NM_000778; NM_001319155; NM_001363587	NM_010011
RefSeq (protein)	NP_000769; NP_001306084; NP_001350516	NP_034141
Location (UCSC)	Chr 1: 46.93 – 46.94 Mb	Chr 4: 115.38 – 115.39 Mb
PubMed search
- Wikidata
View/Edit Human	View/Edit Mouse

Cytochrome P450 4A11 is a protein that in humans is codified by the CYP4A11 gene.

== Family ==
This gene encodes a member of the cytochrome P450 superfamily of enzymes. The cytochrome P450 proteins are monooxygenases, catalyzing many reactions involved in drug metabolism as well as the synthesis of cholesterol, steroids, and other lipids.

== Tissue and subcellular distribution ==
CYP4A11 is highly expressed in the liver and kidney. Its primary subcellular localization is in the endoplasmic reticulum, where it participates in the hydroxylation of medium-chain fatty acids such as laurate and myristate.

== Function ==
CYP4A11 plays a crucial role in metabolizing arachidonic acid into 20-Hydroxyeicosatetraenoic acid (20-HETE) via an Omega oxidation reaction. In humans, the predominant enzymes synthesizing 20-HETE are CYP4F2 and CYP4A11. 20-HETE regulates blood flow, vascularization, blood pressure, and renal ion absorption, particularly in rodents and potentially in humans.

In addition to its role in omega oxidation, CYP4A11 exhibits epoxygenase activity, converting docosahexaenoic acid to epoxydocosapentaenoic acids (EDPs) and eicosapentaenoic acid to epoxyeicosatetraenoic acids (EEQs). Notably, CYP4A11 does not convert arachidonic acid to epoxides, a function primarily performed by CYP2C and CYP2J subfamily members. EDPs and EEQs generally oppose the effects of 20-HETE, demonstrating potent actions in lowering blood pressure, inhibiting thrombosis and inflammation, and reducing cancer cell growth.

Omega-3-rich diets significantly elevate serum and tissue levels of EDPs and EEQs in both animals and humans, making these metabolites the most prominent polyunsaturated fatty acid derivatives resulting from such diets.

Members of the CYP4A and CYP4F subfamilies, along with CYP2U1, also ω-hydroxylate various fatty acid metabolites of arachidonic acid—including LTB4, 5-HETE, 5-oxo-eicosatetraenoic acid, 12-HETE, and several prostaglandins—thereby modulating inflammatory, vascular, and other biological responses.

== Clinical significance ==
Polymorphisms in CYP4A11 are associated with susceptibility to hypertension and cerebral infarction (ischemic stroke) in humans. The T8590C single nucleotide polymorphism (SNP), rs1126742, results in a CYP4A11 variant with significantly reduced enzymatic activity, likely due to a loss-of-function mutation. This variant may reduce the production of EEQs and EDPs, contributing to blood pressure dysregulation. Dietary sesamin, a major lignan in sesame, inhibits CYP4A11, reducing 20-HETE synthesis and lowering its plasma and urinary levels. This inhibition has been demonstrated in both in vitro and human studies. Furthermore, hydroxylation-induced inactivation by CYP4A and CYP4F enzymes is implicated in modulating inflammation, potentially explaining the links between CYP4F2 and CYP4F3 variants and human Crohn's disease and Coeliac disease.
