= Arachidonic acid =

20-Carbon polyunsaturated fatty acid

- Structural formula of arachidonic acid

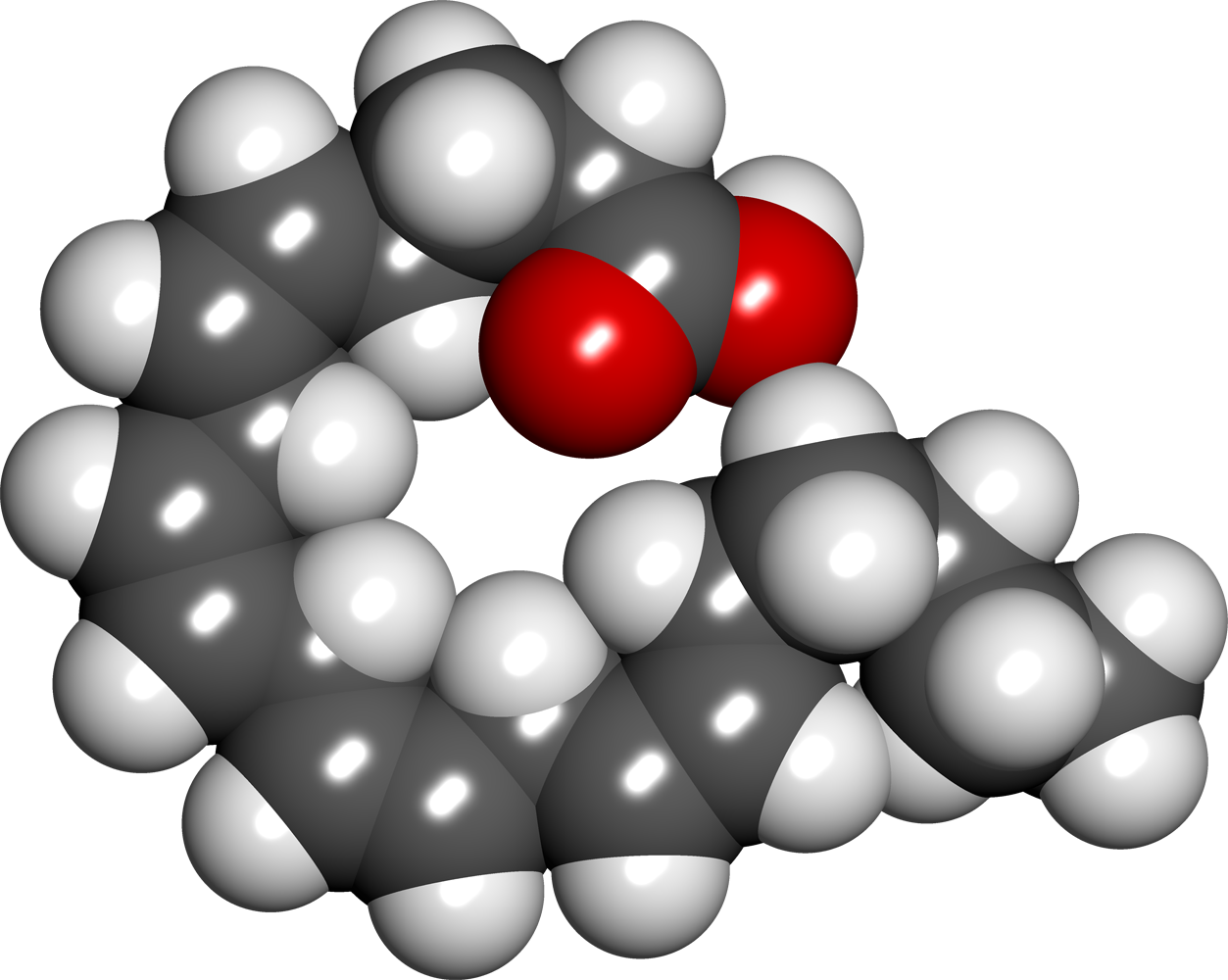

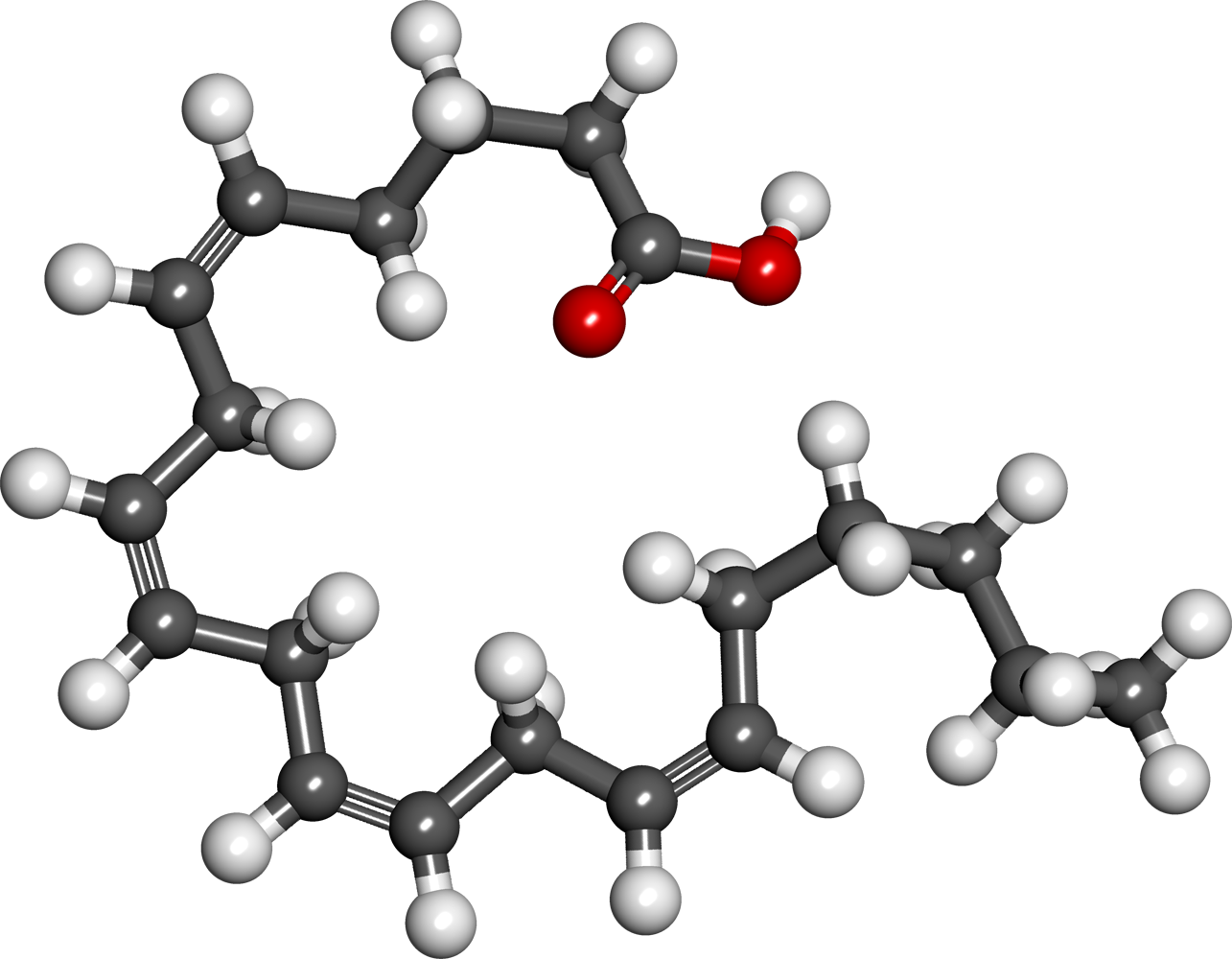

Names
- Preferred IUPAC name (5Z,8Z,11Z,14Z)-Icosa-5,8,11,14-tetraenoic acid
- Other names 5,8,11,14-all-cis-Eicosatetraenoic acid all-cis-5,8,11,14-Eicosatetraenoic acid

Identifiers
CAS Number	506-32-1
3D model (JSmol)	Interactive image
Beilstein Reference	1713889
ChEBI	CHEBI:15843
ChEMBL	ChEMBL15594
ChemSpider	392692
DrugBank	DB04557
ECHA InfoCard	100.007.304
EC Number	208-033-4
Gmelin Reference	58972
IUPHAR/BPS	2391
KEGG	C00219
MeSH	Arachidonic+acid
PubChem CID	444899
RTECS number	CE6675000
UNII	27YG812J1I
CompTox Dashboard (EPA)	DTXSID4040420
- InChI: InChI=1S/C20H32O2/c1-2-3-4-5-6-7-8-9-10-11-12-13-14-15-16-17-18-19-20(21)22/h6-7,9-10,12-13,15-16H,2-5,8,11,14,17-19H2,1H3,(H,21,22) Key: YZXBAPSDXZZRGB-UHFFFAOYSA-N; InChI=1S/C20H32O2/c1-2-3-4-5-6-7-8-9-10-11-12-13-14-15-16-17-18-19-20(21)22/h6-7,9-10,12-13,15-16H,2-5,8,11,14,17-19H2,1H3,(H,21,22)/b7-6-,10-9-,13-12-,16-15-; Key: YZXBAPSDXZZRGB-DOFZRALJSA-N
- SMILES: CCCCC/C=C\C/C=C\C/C=C\C/C=C\CCCC(=O)O

Properties
Chemical formula	C_{20}H_{32}O_{2}
Molar mass	304.474 g·mol^{−1}
Density	0.922 g/cm^{3}
Melting point	−49 °C (−56 °F; 224 K)
Boiling point	169 to 171 °C (336 to 340 °F; 442 to 444 K) at 0.15 mmHg
log P	6.994
Acidity (pK_{a})	4.752

Hazards
- GHS labelling
Pictograms	(GHS07: Exclamation mark)
Signal word	Warning
Hazard statements	H302, H312, H315, H319, H332, H335
Precautionary statements	P261, P264, P270, P271, P280, P301+P312, P302+P352, P304+P312, P304+P340, P305+P351+P338, P312, P321, P322, P330, P332+P313, P337+P313, P362, P363, P403+P233, P405, P501
NFPA 704 (fire diamond)	1 1 0
Flash point	113 °C (235 °F; 386 K)

Related compounds
Related compounds	Eicosatetraenoic acid
- Except where otherwise noted, data are given for materials in their standard state (at 25 °C [77 °F], 100 kPa). verify (what is ?) Infobox references

Arachidonic acid (AA, sometimes ARA) is a polyunsaturated omega−6 fatty acid 20:4(ω−6), or 20:4(5,8,11,14). It is a precursor in the formation of leukotrienes, prostaglandins, and thromboxanes.

Together with omega−3 fatty acids and other omega−6 fatty acids, arachidonic acid provides energy for body functions, contributes to cell membrane structure, and participates in the synthesis of eicosanoids, which have numerous roles in physiology as signaling molecules.

It was named after the similarly structured arachidic acid, a constituent of peanut oil whose name in turn derives from the ancient Greek neologism arachis 'peanut'. Peanut oil does not contain any arachidonic acid, itself. Arachidonate is the name of the derived carboxylate anion (conjugate base of the acid), salts, and some esters.

== Chemistry ==
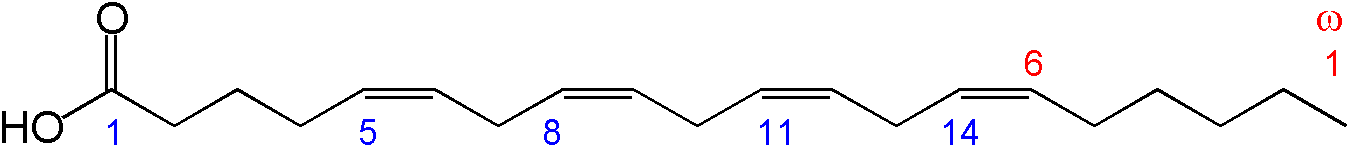

In chemical structure, arachidonic acid is a carboxylic acid with a 20-carbon chain and four cis-double bonds; the first double bond is located at the sixth carbon from the omega end.

Some chemistry sources define 'arachidonic acid' to designate any of the eicosatetraenoic acids. However, almost all writings in biology, medicine, and nutrition limit the term to all cis-5,8,11,14-eicosatetraenoic acid.

== Biology ==
Arachidonic acid is a polyunsaturated fatty acid present in the phospholipids (especially phosphatidylethanolamine, phosphatidylcholine, and phosphatidylinositides) of membranes of the body's cells, and is abundant in the brain, muscles, and liver. Skeletal muscle is an especially active site of arachidonic acid retention, accounting for roughly 10–20% of the phospholipid fatty acid content typically.

In addition to being involved in cellular signaling as a lipid second messenger involved in the regulation of signaling enzymes, such as PLC-γ, PLC-δ, and PKC-α, -β, and -γ isoforms, arachidonic acid is a key inflammatory intermediate and can also act as a vasodilator. (Note separate synthetic pathways, as described in section below.)

== Biosynthesis and cascade in humans ==
=== De novo ===
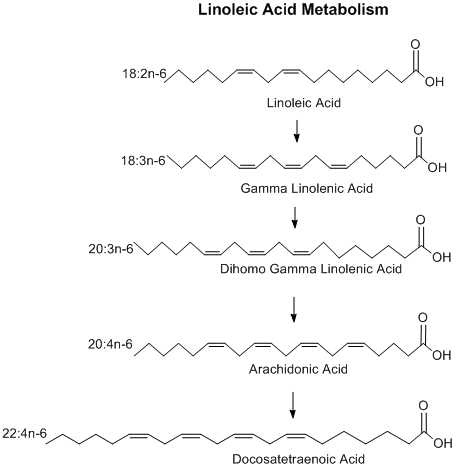
Linoleic acid metabolism

Arachidonic acid is synthesized from linoleic acid (LA) via a process starting with the conversion of LA into gamma-linolenic acid (GLA), effected by Δ6 desaturase.

=== By hydrolysis ===
Eicosanoid synthesis

Arachidonic acid is freed from phospholipids that contain an arachidonic acid sidechain by hydrolysis, catalyzed by the phospholipase A_{2} (PLA_{2}).

Arachidonic acid for signaling purposes appears to be derived by the action of group IVA cytosolic phospholipase A_{2} (cPLA_{2}, 85 kDa), whereas inflammatory arachidonic acid is generated by the action of a low-molecular-weight secretory PLA_{2} (sPLA_{2}, 14-18 kDa).

Arachidonic acid is a precursor to a wide range of eicosanoids:

- The enzymes cyclooxygenase-1 and -2 (i.e. prostaglandin G/H synthase 1 and 2 [PTGS1 and PTGS2]) convert arachidonic acid to prostaglandin G_{2} and prostaglandin H_{2}, which in turn may be converted to various prostaglandins, to prostacyclin, to thromboxanes, and to the 17-carbon product of thromboxane metabolism of prostaglandin G_{2}/H_{2}, 12-hydroxyheptadecatrienoic acid (12-HHT).
- The enzyme 5-lipoxygenase catalyzes the oxidation of arachidonic acid to 5-hydroperoxyeicosatetraenoic acid (5-HPETE), which in turn converts to various leukotrienes (i.e., leukotriene B_{4}, leukotriene C_{4}, leukotriene D_{4}, and leukotriene E_{4}) as well as to 5-hydroxyeicosatetraenoic acid (5-HETE) which may then be further metabolized to 5-HETE's more potent 5-keto analog, 5-oxo-eicosatetraenoic acid (5-oxo-ETE) (also see 5-hydroxyeicosatetraenoic acid).
- The enzymes 15-lipoxygenase-1 (ALOX15) and 15-lipoxygenase-2 (ALOX15B). ALOX15B catalyzes the oxidation of arachidonic acid to 15-hydroperoxyeicosatetraenoic acid (15-HPETE), which may then be further converted to 15-hydroxyeicosatetraenoic acid (15-HETE) and lipoxins; 15-Lipoxygenase-1 may also further metabolize 15-HPETE to eoxins in a pathway analogous to (and presumably using the same enzymes as used in) the pathway which metabolizes 5-HPETE to leukotrienes.
- The enzyme 12-lipoxygenase (ALOX12) catalyzes oxidation of arachidonic acid to 12-hydroperoxyeicosatetraenoic acid (12-HPETE), which may then be metabolized to 12-hydroxyeicosatetraenoic acid (12-HETE) and to hepoxilins.
- Arachidonic acid is also a precursor to anandamide.
- Some arachidonic acid is converted into hydroxyeicosatetraenoic acids (HETEs) and epoxyeicosatrienoic acids (EETs) by epoxygenase.

The production of these derivatives and their actions in the body are collectively known as the "arachidonic acid cascade"; see Essential fatty acid interactions and the enzyme and metabolite linkages given in the previous paragraph for more details.

==== PLA_{2} activation ====
PLA_{2}, in turn, is activated by ligand binding to receptors, including:

- 5-HT2 receptors
- mGLUR1
- bFGF receptor
- IFN-α receptor
- IFN-γ receptor

Furthermore, any agent increasing intracellular calcium may cause activation of some forms of PLA_{2}.

==== PLC activation ====
Alternatively, arachidonic acid may be cleaved from phospholipids after phospholipase C (PLC) cleaves off the inositol trisphosphate group, yielding diacylglycerol (DAG), which subsequently is cleaved by DAG lipase to yield arachidonic acid.

Receptors that activate this pathway include:

- A_{1} receptor
- D_{2} receptor
- α_{2} adrenergic receptor
- 5-HT1 receptor

PLC may also be activated by MAP kinase. Activators of this pathway include PDGF and FGF.

== In the body ==
=== Cell membranes ===
Along with other omega−6 and omega−3 fatty acids, arachidonic acid contributes to the structure of cell membranes. When incorporated into phospholipids, the omega fatty acid affects cell membrane properties, such as permeability and the activity of enzymes and cell-signaling mechanisms.

=== Brain ===
Arachidonic acid, one of the most abundant fatty acids in the brain, is present in similar quantities to docosahexaenoic acid, with the two accounting for about 20% of brain fatty-acid content. Arachidonic acid is involved in the early neurological development of infants.

== Dietary supplement ==
Arachidonic acid is marketed as a dietary supplement. A 2019 review of clinical studies investigating the potential health effects of arachidonic acid supplementation of up to 1500 mg per day on human health found there were no clear benefits. There were no adverse effects in adults of using high daily doses (1500 mg) of arachidonic acid on several biomarkers of blood chemistry, immune function, and inflammation.

A 2009 review indicated that consumption of 5−10% of food energy from omega−6 fatty acids including arachidonic acid may reduce the risk of cardiovascular diseases compared to lower intakes. A 2014 meta-analysis of possible associations between heart disease risk and individual fatty acids reported a significantly reduced risk of heart disease with higher levels of EPA, DHA, and arachidonic acid.

== Veterinary medicine ==
Cats have low Δ6 desaturase activity and cannot efficiently convert linoleic acid into arachidonic acid. As a result, they need to acquire it from food.

== See also ==
- Aspirin—inhibits cyclooxygenase enzyme, preventing conversion of arachidonic acid to other signal molecules
- Docosadienoic acid
- Fish oil
- Juniperonic acid, an isomer
- Polyunsaturated fat
