= Leukotriene B4 =

Leukotriene B_{4}

Names
- Preferred IUPAC name (5S,6Z,8E,10E,12R,14Z)-5,12-Dihydroxyicosa-6,8,10,14-tetraenoic acid

Identifiers
CAS Number	71160-24-2
3D model (JSmol)	Interactive image
ChEBI	CHEBI:15647
ChEMBL	ChEMBL65061
ChemSpider	4444132
IUPHAR/BPS	2487
KEGG	C02165
PubChem CID	5280492
UNII	1HGW4DR56D
CompTox Dashboard (EPA)	DTXSID4037162
- InChI: InChI=1S/C20H32O4/c1-2-3-4-5-6-9-13-18(21)14-10-7-8-11-15-19(22)16-12-17-20(23)24/h6-11,14-15,18-19,21-22H,2-5,12-13,16-17H2,1H3,(H,23,24)/b8-7+,9-6-,14-10+,15-11-/t18-,19-/m1/s1 Key: VNYSSYRCGWBHLG-AMOLWHMGSA-N
- SMILES: CCCCC/C=C\C[C@H](/C=C/C=C/C=C\[C@H](CCCC(=O)O)O)O

Properties
Chemical formula	C_{20}H_{32}O_{4}
Molar mass	336.472 g·mol^{−1}
- Except where otherwise noted, data are given for materials in their standard state (at 25 °C [77 °F], 100 kPa). Infobox references

Leukotriene B_{4} (LTB_{4}) is a leukotriene involved in inflammation. It has been shown to promote insulin resistance in obese mice.

== Biochemistry ==
LTB_{4} is a leukotriene involved in inflammation. It is produced from leukocytes in response to inflammatory mediators and is able to induce the adhesion and activation of leukocytes on the endothelium, allowing them to bind to and cross it into the tissue. In neutrophils, it is also a potent chemoattractant, and is able to induce the formation of reactive oxygen species and the release of lysosomal enzymes by these cells. It is synthesized by leukotriene-A4 hydrolase from leukotriene A_{4}.

Eicosanoid synthesis (leukotrienes at right)

== Diabetes ==
A study at the University of California, San Diego School of Medicine has shown that LTB_{4} promotes insulin resistance in obese mice. Obesity is the major cause of insulin resistance in type 2 diabetes.
