= 12-Hydroxyeicosatetraenoic acid =

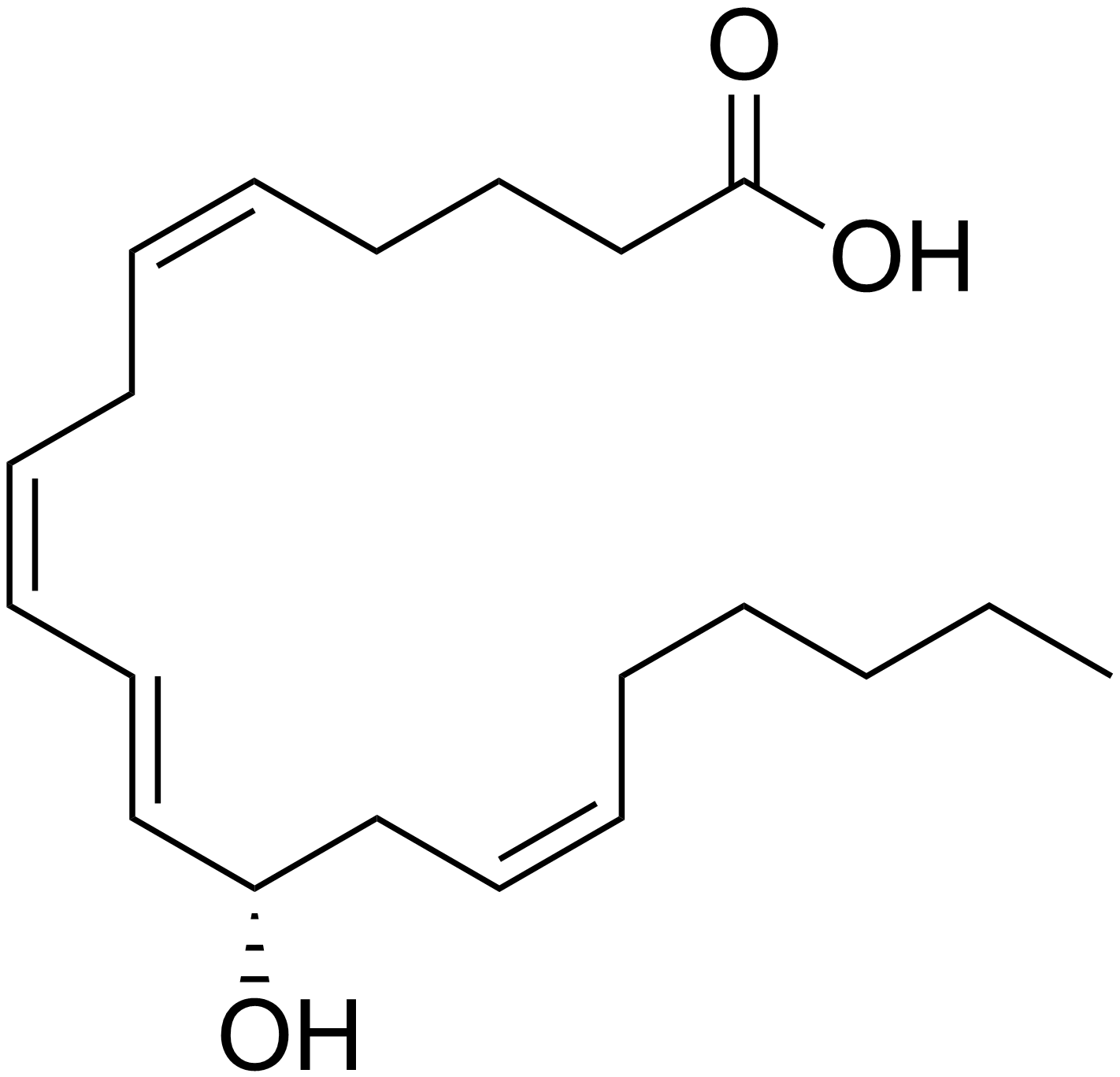

Names
- Preferred IUPAC name (5Z,8Z,10E,12S,14Z)-12-Hydroxyicosa-5,8,10,14-tetraenoic acid
- Other names 12-HETE; 12(S)-HETE

Identifiers
CAS Number	71030-37-0; 54397-83-0 (S); 59985-28-3 (non-specific)
3D model (JSmol)	Interactive image; Interactive image
ChEBI	CHEBI:34146
ChemSpider	4446279
IUPHAR/BPS	3404
PubChem CID	13786989
UNII	Q6F9H3VPC0; WG8M7C9ALT (S)
CompTox Dashboard (EPA)	DTXSID001028839
- InChI: InChI=1S/C20H32O3/c1-2-3-4-5-10-13-16-19(21)17-14-11-8-6-7-9-12-15-18-20(22)23/h7-11,13-14,17,19,21H,2-6,12,15-16,18H2,1H3,(H,22,23)/b9-7-,11-8-,13-10-,17-14+/t19-/m0/s1 Key: ZNHVWPKMFKADKW-LQWMCKPYSA-N; InChI=1/C20H32O3/c1-2-3-4-5-10-13-16-19(21)17-14-11-8-6-7-9-12-15-18-20(22)23/h7-11,13-14,17,19,21H,2-6,12,15-16,18H2,1H3,(H,22,23)/b9-7-,11-8-,13-10-,17-14+/t19-/m0/s1 Key: ZNHVWPKMFKADKW-LQWMCKPYBD
- SMILES: CCCCC/C=C\C[C@@H](/C=C/C=C\C/C=C\CCCC(=O)O)O; O=C(O)CCC\C=C/C/C=C\C=C\[C@@H](O)C\C=C/CCCCC

Properties
Chemical formula	C_{20}H_{32}O_{3}
Molar mass	320.473 g·mol^{−1}
- Except where otherwise noted, data are given for materials in their standard state (at 25 °C [77 °F], 100 kPa). verify (what is ?) Infobox references

12-Hydroxyeicosatetraenoic acid (12-HETE) is a derivative of the 20 carbon polyunsaturated fatty acid, arachidonic acid, containing a hydroxyl residue at carbon 12 and a 5Z,8Z,10E,14Z cis–trans configuration (Z=cis, E=trans) in its four double bonds. It was first found as a product of arachidonic acid metabolism made by human and bovine platelets through their 12S-lipoxygenase (i.e. ALOX12) enzyme(s). However, the term 12-HETE is ambiguous in that it has been used to indicate not only the initially detected "S" stereoisomer, 12S-hydroxy-5Z,8Z,10E,14Z-eicosatetraenoic acid (12(S)-HETE or 12S-HETE), made by platelets, but also the later detected "R" stereoisomer, 12(R)-hydroxy-5Z,8Z,10E,14Z-eicosatetraenoic acid (also termed 12(R)-HETE or 12R-HETE) made by other tissues through their 12R-lipoxygenase enzyme, ALOX12B. The two isomers, either directly or after being further metabolized, have been suggested to be involved in a variety of human physiological and pathological reactions. Unlike hormones which are secreted by cells, travel in the circulation to alter the behavior of distant cells, and thereby act as endocrine signalling agents, these arachidonic acid metabolites act locally as autocrine signalling and/or paracrine signaling agents to regulate the behavior of their cells of origin or of nearby cells, respectively. In these roles, they may amplify or dampen, expand or contract cellular and tissue responses to disturbances.

== Production ==
In humans, arachidonate 12-lipoxygenase (12-LO, 12-LOX, ALO12, or platelet type 12-lipoxygenase) is encoded by the ALOX12 gene and expressed primarily in platelets and skin. ALOX12 metabolizes arachidonic acid almost exclusively to 12(S)-hydroperoxy-5Z,8Z,10E,14Z-eicosatetraenoic acid (12(S)-HpETE or 12S-HpETE). Arachidonate 15-lipoxygenase-1 (15-LO-1, 15-LOX-1, ALOX15), which is expressed in far more tissues that ALOX12, metabolizes arachidonic acid primarily to 15(S)-HpETE along with other metabolites of the 15-hydroxyicosatetraenoic acid family; during this metabolism, however, ALOX15 also forms 12(S)-HpETE as a minor product. Arachidonate 12-lipoxygenase, 12R type, also termed 12RLOX and encoded by the ALOX12B gene, is expressed primarily in skin and cornea; it metabolizes arachidonic acid to 12(R)-HpETE. Cytochrome P450 enzymes convert arachidonic acid to a variety of hydroperoxy, epoxy, and dihydroxy derivatives including racemic mixtures of 12(S)-HpETE and 12(R)-HpETE or 12(S)-HETE and 12(R)-HETE; the R stereoisomer predominates in these mixtures. The initial 12(S)-HpETE and 12(R)-HpETE products, regardless of their pathway of formation, are rapidly reduced to 12(S)-HETE and 12(R)-HETE, respectively, by ubiquitous cellular peroxidases, including in particular glutathione peroxidases or, alternatively, are further metabolized as described below.

Sub-primate mammals, such as the mouse, rat, rabbit, cow, and pig, express platelet type 12-lipoxygenase but also a leukocyte type 12-lipoxygenase (also termed 12/15-lipoxygenase, 12/15-LOX or 12/15-LO) which is an ortholog of, and metabolically equivalent to, human 15-LO-1 in that it forms predominantly 15(S)-HpETE with 12(S)-HpETE as a minor product. Mice also express an epidermal type 15-lipoxygenase (e-12LO) which has 50.8% amino acid sequence identity to human 15-LOX-2 and 49.3% sequence identity to mouse arachidonate 8-lipoxygenase. Mouse e-12LO metabolizes arachidonic acid predominantly to 12(S)-HETE and to a lesser extent 15(S)-HETE.

Sub-human primates, although not extensively examined, appear to have 12-lipoxygenase expression patterns that resemble those of sub-primate mammals or humans depending on the closeness of there genetic relatedness to these species.

== Further metabolism ==
In human (and mouse) skin epidermis, 12(R)-HpETE is metabolized by Epidermis-type lipoxygenase, i.e. eLOX3 (encoded by the ALOXE3 gene), to two products: a) a specific hepoxilin, 8R-hydroxy-11R,12R-epoxy-5Z,9E,14Z-eicosatetraenoic acid (i.e. 8R-hydroxy-11R,12R-epoxy-hepoxilin A3 or 8R-OH-11R,12R-epoxy-hepoxilin A3) and b) 12-oxo-5Z,8Z,10E,14Z-eicosatetraenoic acid (12-oxo-HETE, 12-oxoETE, 12-Keto-ETE, or 12-KETE); 8R-hydroxy-11R,12R-epoxy-hepoxilin A3 is further metabolized by soluble epoxide hydrolase 2 (sEH) to 8R,11R,12R-trihydroxy-5Z,9E,14Z-eicosatetraenoic acid. 12(R)-HpETE also spontaneously decomposes to a mixture of hepoxilins and trihydroxy-eicosatetraenoic acids that possess R or S hydroxy and epoxy residues at various sites while 8R-hydroxy-11R,12R-epoxy-hepoxilin A3 spontaneously decomposes to 8R,11R,12R-trihydroxy-5Z,9E,14Z-eicosatetraenoic acid. These decompositions may occur during tissue isolation procedures. Recent studies indicate that the metabolism by ALOXE3 of the R stereoisomer of 12-HpETE made by ALOX12B and therefore possibly the S stereoisomer of 12-HpETE made by ALOX12 or ALOX15 is responsible for forming various hepoxilins in the epidermis of human and mouse skin and tongue and possibly other tissues.

Human skin metabolizes 12(S)-HpETE in reactions strictly analogous to those of 12(R)-HpETE; it metabolized 12(S)-HpETE by eLOX3 to 8R-hydroxy-11S,12S-epoxy-5Z,9E,14Z-eicosatetraenoic acid and 12-oxo-ETE, with the former product then being metabolized by sEH to 8R,11S,12S-trihydroxy-5Z,9E,14Z-eicosatetraenoic acid. 12(S)-HpETE also spontaneously decomposes to a mixture of hepoxilins and trihydroxy-eicosatetraenoic acids (trioxilins) that possess R or S hydroxy and R,S or S,R epoxide residues at various sites while 8R-hydroxy-11S,12S-epoxy-hepoxilin A3 spontaneously decomposes to 8R,11S,12S-trihydroxy-5Z,9E,14Z-eicosatetraenoic acid.

In other tissues and animal species, numerous hepoxilins form but the hepoxilin synthase activity responsible for their formation is variable. (Hepoxilin A3 [8R/S-hydroxy-11,12-epoxy-5Z,9E,14Z-eicosatrienoic acid] and hepoxilin B3 [10R/S-hydroxy-11,12-epxoy-5Z,8Z,14Z-eicosatrienoic acid] refer to a mixture of diastereomers and/or enantiomers derived from arachidonic acid.) Cultured RINm5F rat insulinoma cells convert 12(S)-HpETE to hepoxilin A3 in a reaction that is completely dependent on, and co-localizes with, the cells' leukocyte type 12-LOX; furthermore, recombinant rat and porcine leukocyte type 12-LOX as well as human platelet type 12-LOX metabolize 12(S)-HpETE to hepoxilin A3. However, transfection of HEK293 human embryonic kidney cells with each of the 6 rat lipoxygenases, including rat eLOX3, found that hepoxilin B3 production required eLOX3; furthermore, the development of inflammation-induced tactile pain hypersensitivity (hyperesthesia; tactile allodynia) in rats required eLOX3-dependent production of hepoxilin B3 by spinal tissue. Thus, the production of hepoxilins from 12(S)-HpETE may result from the intrinsic activity of platelet or leukocyte type 12-LOX's, require eLOX3, or even result from 12(S)-HpETE spontaneous (and perhaps artefactual) decomposition during isolation. The majority of reports on hepoxilin formation have not defined the pathways evolved.

Human and other mammalian cytochrome P450 enzymes convert 12(S)-HpETE to 12-oxo-ETE.

12-HETE (stereoisomer not determined), 12(S)-HETE, 12-oxo-ETE, hepoxilin B3, and trioxilin B3 are found in the sn-2 position of phospholipids isolated from normal human epidermis and human psoriatic scales. This indicates that the metabolites are acylated into the sn-2 position after being formed and/or directly produced by the metabolism of the arachidonic acid at the sn-2 position of these phospholipids. These acylation reactions may sequester and thereby inactivate or store the metabolites for release during cell stimulation.

12(S)-HETE and 12(R)-HETE are converted to 12-oxo-ETE by microsomal NAD+-dependent 12-hydroxyeicosanoid dehydrogenase in porcine polymophonuclear leukocytes; a similar pathway may be active in rabbit corneal epithelium, cow corneal epithelium, and mouse keratinocytes although this pathway has not been described in human tissues.

12-oxo-ETE is metabolised by cytosolic NADH-dependent 12-oxoeicosinoid Δ10-reductase to 12-oxo-5Z,8Z,14Z-eicosatrienoic acid (12-oxo-ETrE); 12-ketoreductase may then reduce this 12-oxo-ETrE to 12(R)-hydroxy-5Z,8Z,14Z-eicosatrienoic acid (12(R)-HETrE) and to a lesser extent 12(S)-hydroxy-5Z,8Z,14Z-eicosatrienoic acid (12(S)-HETrE).

== Receptor targets and mechanisms of action ==
The G protein-coupled receptor, GPR31, cloned from PC3 human prostate cancer cell line is a high affinity (Kd=4.8 nM) receptor for 12(S)-HETE; GPR31 does not bind 12(R)-HETE and has relatively little affinity for 5(S)-HETE or 15(S)-HETE. GPR31 mRNA is expressed at low levels in several human cell lines including K562 cells (human myelogenous leukemia cell line), Jurkat cells, (T lymphocyte cell line), Hut78 cells (T cell lymphoma cell line), HEK 293 cells (primary embryonic kidney cell line), MCF7 cells (mammary adenocarcinoma cell line), and EJ cells (bladder carcinoma cell line). This mRNA appears to be more highly expressed in PC3 and DU145 prostate cancer cell lines as well as in human umbilical vein endothelial cells (HUVEC), human umbilical vein endothelial cells (HUVEC), human brain microvascular endothelial cells (HBMEC), and human pulmonary aortic endothelial cells (HPAC). In PC-3 prostate cancer cells, GPR31 receptor mediates the action of 12(S)-HETE in activating the mitogen-activated protein kinase kinase/extracellular signal-regulated kinases-1/2 pathway and NFκB pathway that lead to cell growth and other functions. Studies have not yet determined the role, if any, in GPR31 receptor in the action of 12(S)-HETE in other cell types.

A G protein-coupled receptor for the 5(S),12(R)-dihydroxy metabolite of arachidonic acid, leukotriene B4, vis., leukotriene B4 receptor 2 (BLT2), but not its leukotriene B4 receptor 1, mediates responses to 12(S)-HETE, 12(R)-HETE, and 12-oxo-ETE in many cell types. Based on the effects of LTB4 receptor antagonists, for example, leukotriene B4 receptor 2 mediates: the rise in cytosolic Ca^{2+} concentration (a key signal for cell activation) in human neutrophils and the rise in cytosolic Ca^{2+} concentration and chemotaxis in Chinese hamstery ovarian cells stimulated by 12(S)-HETE, 12(R)-HETE, and/or 12-oxo-ETE; the itch response to 12(S)-HETE and PMN inflammatory infiltration response to 12(R)-HETE triggered by the injection these metabolites into the skin of mice and guinea pigs, respectively; and an in vitro angiogenic response by human umbilical vein endothelial cells (HUVEC) and in vivo angiogenic response by mice to 12(S)-HETE. The BLT2 receptor, in contrast to the GPR31 receptor, appears to be expressed at a high level in a wide range of tissues including neutrophils, eosinophils, monocytes, spleen, liver, and ovary. However, 12-hydroxyheptadecatrienoic acid (i.e. 12-(S)-hydroxy-5Z,8E,10E-heptadecatrienoic acid or 12-HHT), a product made when prostaglandin H2 is metabolized to thromboxane A2 by thromboxane synthase or spontaneously rearranges non-enzymatically is the most potent BLT2 receptor agonist detected to date. To clarify the role of BLT2 versus GPC31 receptors in responses to 12(S)-HETE, and the role(s) of LTB4, 12(S)-HETE, versus 12-HHT in BLT2-mediated responses, it will be necessary to determine: a) if leukotriene B4 interacts with the GPR31 receptor; b) if BLT2 receptor antagonists interfere with the GPR31 receptor; and c) the relative concentrations and availability of LTB4, 12(S)-HETE, and 12-HHT in tissues exhibiting BLT2-dependent responses. Ultimately, both receptors and all three ligands may prove to be responsible for some tissue responses in vivo.

12(S)-HETE and 12(R)-HETE bind to and act as competitive antagonists of the thromboxane receptor which mediates the actions of thromboxane A2 and prostaglandin H2. This antagonistic activity was responsible for the ability of 12(S)-HETE and 12(R)-HETE to relax mouse mesenteric arteries pre-constricted with a thromboxane A2 mimetic, U46619.

12(S)-HETE binds with high affinity to a 50 kilodalton (kDa) subunit of a 650 kDa cytosolic and nuclear protein complex.

== Activities and possible clinical significance ==
=== Inflammation and inflammatory diseases ===
12(S)-HpETE, 12(R)-HETE, racemic mixtures of these 12-HETEs, and/or 12-oxo-ETE stimulate: a) the directed migration (chemotaxis) of human, rat, and rabbit neutrophils as well as rabbit macrophages; b) human neutrophils to adhere to each other (i.e. aggregate) and in cooperation with tumor necrosis factor alpha or platelet-activating factor, to release their granule-bound enzymes; c) the binding of human vascular epithelial cells to human monocytes; d) DNA synthesis and mitogenesis in the immortalized human keratinocyte cell line HaCaT; and e) when injected in the skin of human volunteers, the extravasation and local accumulation of circulating blood neutrophils and mononuclear cells. These results suggest these metabolites contribute to the inflammation that occurs at sites where they are formed in abnormal amounts such as in human rheumatoid arthritis, inflammatory bowel disease, contact dermatitis, psoriasis, various forms of ichthyosis including congenital ichthyosiform erythroderma, and corneal inflammatory diseases. Since BLT2 appears to mediate the responses of leukocytes to 12(S)-HpETE, 12(S)-HETE, 12(R)-HETE, and 12-oxo-ETE but GPR31 is expressed by various other cells (e.g. vascular endothelium) involved in inflammation, the pro-inflammatory actions of 12-HETE in humans may involve both types of G protein-coupled receptors.

=== Itch perception ===
12(S)-HpETE and 12(S)-HETE induce itching responses when injected into the skin of mice; this has led to the suggestion that these metabolites contribute to the itching (i.e. clinical pruritus) which accompanies such conditions as atopic dermatitis, contact dermatitis, urticaria, chronic renal failure, and cholestasis. Since it mediates 12(S)-HETE-induced itching in the mouse model, BLT2 rather than GPR31 may mediate human itch in these reactions.

=== Cancer ===
==== Prostate cancer ====
12-HETE (stereoisomer not defined) is the dominant arachidonic acid metabolite in cultured PC3 human prostate cancer cells and its levels in human prostate cancer tissue exceed by >9-fold its levels in normal human prostate tissue. Furthermore, 12(S)-HETE a) increases the expression of alpha-v beta-5 cell surface adhesion molecule and associated with this the survival of cultured PC3 cells; b) promotes the phosphorylation of retinoblastoma protein to inhibit its tumor suppressor function while promoting the proliferation of cultured PC3 cells; c) stimulates PC3 cells to activate the mitogen-activated protein kinase kinase/extracellular signal-regulated kinases-1/2 pathway and the NFκB pathways that lead to cell proliferation; d) reverses the apoptosis-inducing (i.e. cell-killing) effect of pharmacologically inhibiting 12-LO in cultured DU145 human prostate cancer cells; e) promotes the induction of cyclooxygenase-1 and thereby the synthesis of this enzyme's growth-promoting arachidonic acid metabolite, PGE2, in cultured PC3 and LNCaP human prostate cancer cells; and f) induces cultured PC3 cells to express vascular endothelial growth factor (VEGF), a protein that stimulates the formation of the microvasculature which assists in the metastasis of cancer. These results suggest that the 12(S)-HETE made by prostate cancer tissues serves to promote the growth and spread of this cancer. Since it mediates the action of 12(S)-HETE in stimulating cultured PC3 cells to activate the mitogen-activated protein kinase kinase/extracellular signal-regulated kinases-1/2 pathway and NFκB pathways, the GPR31 receptor may contribute to the pro-malignant activity of 12(S)-HETE. However, LNCaP and PC3 cells also express BLT2 receptors; in LNCaP cells, BLT2 receptors are positively linked (i.e. stimulate the expression of) to the growth- and metastasis-promoting androgen receptor; in PC3 cells, BLT2 receptors stimulate the NF-κB pathway to inhibit the apoptosis caused by cell detachment from surfaces i.e. anoikis; and, in BLT2-overexpressing PWR-1E non-malignant prostate cells, 12(S)-HETE diminish anoikis-induced apoptosis. Thus, the role of 12(S)-HETE in human prostate cancer, if any, may involve its activation of one or both of the GPR31 and BLT2 receptors.

==== Other cancers ====
Preclinical laboratory studies analogous to those conducted on the pro-malignant effects of 12(S)-HETE and growth-inhibiting effects of blocking 12-HETE production in cultured prostate cancer cell lines, have implicated 12-HETE (stereoisomer sometimes undefined) in cancer cell lines from various other human tissues including those from the liver, intestinal epithelium, lung, breast, skin (melanoma), ovary, pancrease, and possibly bladder. These studies implicate the interaction of 12-HETE with BLT2 receptors in intestinal epithelium cancer cells, and BLT2 receptors in breast, ovary, pancreas, and bladder cancer cells. While the studies on these tissues have not been as frequent or diverse as those on prostate cancer cell lines, they are suggested to indicate that 12-HETE contributes to the growth or spread of the corresponding cancer in humans.

=== Diabetes ===
12(S)-HETE, 12(S)-HpETE, and with far less potency 12(R)-HETE reduced insulin secretion and caused apoptosis in cultured human pancreatic insulin-secreting beta cell lines and prepared pancreatic islets. TNFα, IL-1β, and IFNγ also reduced insulin secretion in cultured human pancreatic INS-1 beta cells, apparently by inducing the expression of NOX1 (NADPH oxidase 1) and thereby to the production of cell-toxic reactive oxygen species; these cytokine effects were completely dependent on 12-lipoxygenase and mimicked by 12(S)-HETE but not 12(R)-HETE. 12-lipoxygenase-knockout mice (i.e., mice genetically manipulated to remove the Alox12, i.e. 12-lipoxygenase gene, see Lipoxygenase § Mouse lipoxygenases) are resistant to a) streptozotocin-induced, b) high fat diet-induced, and c) autoimmune-induced diabetes. Further studies in animal models suggest that the 12S-HETE made by pancreatic beta cells (or possibly alpha cells or other cell types indigenous to or invading the pancreatic islands) orchestrate a local immune response that results in the injury and, when extreme, death of beta cells. These results suggest that the 12-lipoxygenase-12S-HETE pathway is one factor contributing to immunity-based type I diabetes as well as low insulin output type II diabetes.

=== Blood pressure ===
12(S)-HETE and 12(S)-HpETE stimulate the dilation of rat mesenteric arteries; 12(S)-HETE stimulates the dilation of coronary microvessels in pigs and the mesenteric arteries of mice, one or more of these three metabolites are implicated in the vasodilation of rat basilar artery, 12(R)-HETE and to a slightly lesser extent 12(S)-HETE constrict the renal artery of dogs and 12-HETE (stereoisomer undetermined) is implicated in the angiotensin II-induced arterial hypertension response of human placenta. The vasodilating effect on mouse mesenteric arteries appears due to 12S-HETE's ability to act as a thromboxane receptor antagonist and thereby block the vasoconstricting actions of thromboxane A2. These results indicate that the cited metabolites have dilating or constricting effects that depend on the arterial vascular site and or species of animal examined; their role in human blood pressure regulation is unclear.

=== Toxic effects ===
Excessive 12-HETE production is implicated in psoriasis.

== See also ==
- 5-Hydroxyeicosatetraenoic acid
- 15-Hydroxyeicosatetraenoic acid
