= HETE =

HETE may refer to:

- High Energy Transient Explorer
- Hydroxyeicosatetraenoic acids:
  - 5-Hydroxyeicosatetraenoic acid
  - 8-hydroxyeicosatetraenoic acid (8-HETE)
  - 12-Hydroxyeicosatetraenoic acid (12-HETE)
  - 15-Hydroxyeicosatetraenoic acid (15-HETE)
  - 19-Hydroxyeicosatetraenoic acid (19-HETE)
  - 20-Hydroxyeicosatetraenoic acid (20-HETE)

For further details of these and other hydroxeicosatetraenoic acids, e.g. 18-HETE, 17-HETE, and 16-HETE, see eicosanoid and lipoxygenase pages.
