= NIPAL4 =

Gene

Identifiers
- Aliases: NIPAL4, ARCI6, ICHTHYIN, ICHYN, NIPA like domain containing 4, SLC57A6
- External IDs: OMIM: 609383; MGI: 2444671; GeneCards: NIPAL4

Gene location (Human)
Chr.	Chromosome 5 (human)
Band	5q33.3	Start	157,460,213 bp
Band	5q33.3	End	157,474,722 bp

Gene location (Mouse)
Chr.	Chromosome 11 (mouse)
Band	11|11 B1.1	Start	46,038,982 bp
Band	11|11 B1.1	End	46,057,335 bp
RNA expression pattern
Bgee	Human / Mouse (ortholog); Top expressed in: skin of arm; skin of abdomen; skin of leg; gingival epithelium; testicle; skin of thigh; vulva; C1 segment; human penis; nipple / Top expressed in: transitional epithelium of urinary bladder; lumbar subsegment of spinal cord; esophagus; umbilical cord; skin of external ear; skin of back; lip; skin of abdomen; decidua; otic vesicle; More reference expression data
BioGPS	n/a
Gene ontology
Molecular function	magnesium ion transmembrane transporter activity
Cellular component	integral component of membrane; membrane
Biological process	magnesium ion transmembrane transport; ion transport; magnesium ion transport
Sources:Amigo / QuickGO
Orthologs
Databases	NCBI: entry; OMA: entry
Species	Human	Mouse
Entrez	348938	214112
Ensembl	ENSG00000172548	ENSMUSG00000020411
UniProt	Q0D2K0	Q8BZF2
RefSeq (mRNA)	NM_001099287; NM_001172292	NM_172524
RefSeq (protein)	NP_001092757; NP_001165763	NP_766112
Location (UCSC)	Chr 5: 157.46 – 157.47 Mb	Chr 11: 46.04 – 46.06 Mb
PubMed search
- Wikidata
View/Edit Human	View/Edit Mouse

Nipa‐Like Domain‐Containing 4, also known as NIPAL4 or Ichthyin, is a gene that is predicted to code for a transmembrane protein with nine transmembrane domains. NIPAL4 codes for the protein magnesium transporter NIPA4, which acts as a Mg^{2+} transporter.

== Expression ==
NIPAL4 is mainly expressed in the skin, specifically in the granular layer of the epidermis.

== Function ==
NIPAL4 codes for a magnesium transporter that can also transport other divalent cations such as Ba^{2+}, Mn^{2+}, Sr^{2+} and Co^{2+}, though to a much less extent than Mg^{2+}. There is also evidence that NIPAL4 is involved in the synthesis of very long chain fatty acids involved in the epidermal lipid metabolism. Disruptions to this pathway results in impaired skin function, causing the symptoms of ARCI.

== Pathology ==
Mutations in this gene account for 16% of autosomal recessive congenital ichthyosis (ARCI) cases, making it the 2nd most common gene involved with this disease. Since its first identification in 2004, 18 disease‐causing mutations have been reported in NIPAL4.

== See also ==
- Lamellar Ichthyosis
- Congenital ichthyosiform erythroderma
- Ichthyosis
- Skin
