= Ichthyosis =

Family of disorders causing dry, thickened, scaly skin

- Other names: Ichthyoses
- Ichthyosis is characterized by generalised scaly skin.
- Specialty: Dermatology

Ichthyosis is a family of genetic skin disorders characterized by dry, thickened, scaly skin. The more than 20 types of ichthyosis range in severity of symptoms, outward appearance, underlying genetic cause and mode of inheritance (e.g., dominant, recessive, autosomal or X-linked). Ichthyosis comes from Greek ἰχθύς (ichthys) 'fish', since dry, scaly skin is the defining feature of all forms of ichthyosis.

The severity of symptoms can vary enormously, from the mildest, most common, types such as ichthyosis vulgaris, which may be mistaken for normal dry skin, up to life-threatening conditions such as harlequin-type ichthyosis. Ichthyosis vulgaris accounts for more than 95% of cases.

== Types ==
Many types of ichthyoses exist, and an exact diagnosis may be difficult. Types of ichthyoses are classified by their appearance, if they are syndromic or not, and by mode of inheritance. For example, non-syndromic ichthyoses that are inherited recessively come under the umbrella term autosomal recessive congenital ichthyosis (ARCI). In order to replace outdated or potentially stigmatizing old disease names, there is an ongoing effort to redefine the classification of epidermal differentiation disorders (EDDs), including ichthyoses, based on the affected gene. This system also distinguishes between syndromic (sEDDs) and non-syndromic forms (nEDDs).

Ichthyosis caused by mutations in the same gene can vary considerably in severity and symptoms. Some ichthyoses do not appear to fit exactly into any one type, while mutations in different genes can produce ichthyoses with similar symptoms. Of note, X-linked ichthyosis is associated with Kallmann syndrome (close to the KAL1 gene). The most common or well-known types are:

=== Non-syndromic ichthyosis ===
New name(s)	Previous name(s)	OMIM	Mode Of Inheritance	Gene(s)
FLG-nEDD	Ichthyosis vulgaris	146700	Autosomal semi-dominant	FLG
ABCA12-nEDD	Harlequin ichthyosis	242500	Autosomal recessive	ABCA12
TGMI1-nEDD, NIPAL4-nEDD, ALOX12B-nEDD, ALOXE3-nEDD, ABCA12-nEDD, LIPN-nEDD, CERS3-nEDD, PNPLA1-nEDD, CASP14-nEDD, ST14-sEDD	Lamellar ichthyosis, Congenital ichthyosiform erythoderma	242100, 242300	Autosomal recessive	TGMI1, NIPAL4, ALOX12B, ALOXE3, ABCA12, CYP4F22, LIPN, CERS3, PNPLA1, ST14, CASP14
TGMI1-nEDD	Bathing suit ichthyosis	242300	Autosomal recessive	TGMI1
KRT1-nEDD epidermolytic, KRT10-nEDD epidermolytic	Epidermolytic ichthyosis	113800	Autosomal dominant, Autosomal recessive	KRT1, KRT10
KRT2-nEDD	Superficial epidermolytic ichthyosis	146800	Autosomal dominant	KRT2
KRT1-nEDD-annular, KRT10-nEDD-annular	Annular epidermolytic ichthyosis	607602	Autosomal dominant	KRT1, KRT10
KRT1-nEDD-spiny	Ichthyosis Curth-Macklin	146590	Autosomal dominant	KRT1
KRT1-nEDD revertant mosaic, KRT10-nEDD revertant mosaic	Congenital reticular ichthyosiform erythroderma	609165	Autosomal dominant	KRT1, KRT10
KRT1-nEDD mosaic, KRT2-nEDD mosaic, KRT10-nEDD mosaic, KRT16-nEDD mosaic,	Epidermolytic nevi	113800	Postzygotic mosaicism	KRT1, KRT2, KRT10, KRT16
LOR-pEDD	Loricrin keratoderma	604117	Autosomal dominant	LOR
GJB3-nEDD, GJB4-nEDD	Erythrokeratodermia variabilis	133200	Autosomal dominant	GJB3, GJB4
CDSN-nEDD	Peeling skin disease	270300	Autosomal recessive	CDSN
POMP-nEDD	Keratosis linearis with ichthyosis congenita and sclerosing keratoderma	601952	Autosomal recessive	POMP
SLC27A4-nEDD	Ichthyosis prematurity syndrome	608649	Autosomal recessive	SLC27A4

=== Syndromic ichthyosis ===
New name(s)	Previous Name(s)	OMIM	Mode Of Inheritance	Gene (s)
STS-sEDD	X-linked recessive ichthyosis syndromic forms	308700 300500 300533	X-linked recessive	STS
MBTPS2-sEDD-IFAP, MBTPS2-sEDD-ciatricial alopecia	Ichthyosis follicularis with alopecia and photophobia syndrome	308205	X-linked recessive	MBTPS2
EBP-sEDD	Conradi-Hunermann-Happle syndrome	302960	X-linked dominant	EBP
SPINK5-sEDD	Netherton syndrome	256500	Autosomal recessive	SPINK5
ST14-sEDD	Ichthyosis-hypotrichosis syndrome	610765	Autosomal recessive	ST14
ERCC2/XBP-sEDD-TTD, ERCC3/XPB-sEDD-TTD, GTF2H5-sEDD-TTD	Trichothiodystrophy	601675	Autosomal recessive	ERCC2, ERCC3, GTF2H5
MPLKIP-sEDD	Trichothiodystrophy (non-congenital forms)	275550 211390 601675	Autosomal recessive	C7Orf11, TTDN1
ALDH3A2-sEDD	Sjögren-Larsson syndrome	270200	Autosomal recessive	ALDH3A2
PHYH-sEDD, PEX7-sEDD	Refsum's disease	266500	Autosomal recessive	PHYH, PEX7
SNAP29-sEDD	Mental retardation, enteropathy, deafness, neuropathy, ichthyosis, keratoderma syndrome	609528	Autosomal recessive	SNAP29
VPS33B-sEDD	Arthrogryposis, renal dysfunction, cholestasis syndrome	208085	Autosomal recessive	VPS33B
GJB2-sEDD-KID	Keratitis-ichthyosis-deafness syndrome	602450 148210	Autosomal dominant	GJB2
ABHD5-sEDD	Neutral lipid storage disease with ichthyosis	275630	Autosomal recessive	ABHD5
PHGDH-sEDD, PSAT1-sEDD, PSPH-sEDD	Neu–Laxova syndrome	256520 616038	autosomal recessive	PHGDH, PSAT1, PSPH

=== Non-genetic ichthyosis ===
- Ichthyosis acquisita

== Diagnosis ==
A physician often can diagnose ichthyosis by looking at the skin. A family history is also useful in determining the mode of inheritance. In some cases, a skin biopsy is done to help to confirm the diagnosis while in others genetic testing may be helpful in making a diagnosis. Diabetes has not been definitively linked to acquired ichthyosis or ichthyosis vulgaris; however, there are case reports associating new onset ichthyosis with diabetes.

Ichthyosis has been found to be more common in Native American, Asian, Mongolian groups. There is no way to prevent ichthyosis.

Ichthyosis is a genetically and phenotypically heterogeneous disease that can be isolated and restricted to the skin manifestations or associated with extracutaneous symptoms, one of which is limb reduction defect known as CHILD syndrome, a rare inborn error of metabolism of cholesterol biosynthesis that is usually restricted to one side of the body. One case with symptoms matching CHILD syndrome has been described as having a likely-different cause.

== Treatments ==
Treatments for ichthyosis often take the form of topical application of creams and emollient oils, in an attempt to hydrate the skin. Creams containing a high percentage of urea or lactic acid have been shown to work exceptionally well in some cases. Application of propylene glycol is another treatment method. Retinoids are used for some conditions.

Exposure to sunlight may improve or worsen the condition. In some cases, excess dead skin sloughs off much better from wet tanned skin after bathing or a swim, although the dry skin might be preferable to the damaging effects of sun exposure.

There can be ocular manifestations of ichthyosis, such as corneal and ocular surface diseases. Vascularizing keratitis, which is more commonly found in congenital keratitis-ichythosis-deafness (KID), may worsen with isotretinoin therapy.

== Other animals ==
Ichthyosis or ichthyosis-like disorders exist for several types of animals, including cattle, chickens, llamas, mice, and dogs. Ichthyosis of varying severity is well documented in some popular breeds of domestic dogs. The most common breeds to have ichthyosis are Golden Retrievers, American bulldogs, Jack Russell Terriers, and Cairn Terriers.

== In fiction ==
- Arthur Conan Doyle – "The Adventure of the Blanched Soldier"
- Michel Faber – The Crimson Petal and the White
- George R. R. Martin – A Song of Ice and Fire
- Bernard Minier – Sisters
- DC Comics - Killer Croc
- Osamu Tezuka - Black Jack
- The X-Files - "Humbug" (Season 2, Episode 20)

== See also ==
- Skin disease
- Ichthyosis en confetti
- List of cutaneous conditions
- List of cutaneous neoplasms associated with systemic syndromes
