= TGK =

TGK may refer to:

- Keratinocyte transglutaminase, an enzyme
- Chemical oxygen generator
- Tongkang LRT station (LRT station abbreviation), Sengkang, Singapore
