= CYP4F22 =

Protein-coding gene in the species Homo sapiens

Identifiers
- Aliases: CYP4F22, ARCI5, INLNE, LI3, cytochrome P450 family 4 subfamily F member 22
- External IDs: OMIM: 611495; MGI: 2445210; GeneCards: CYP4F22
Enzyme activity
EC #	BRENDA	ExPASy	KEGG	MetaCyc
1.14.14.177	↗	↗	↗	↗

Gene location (Human)
Chr.	Chromosome 19 (human)
Band	19p13.12	Start	15,508,525 bp
Band	19p13.12	End	15,552,317 bp

Gene location (Mouse)
Chr.	Chromosome 17 (mouse)
Band	17|17 B1	Start	32,671,697 bp
Band	17|17 B1	End	32,712,294 bp
RNA expression pattern
Bgee	Human / Mouse (ortholog); Top expressed in: skin of arm; skin of leg; skin of abdomen; vulva; human penis; gonad; skin of thigh; gums; granulocyte; gingival epithelium / Top expressed in: lip; esophagus; spermatid; skin of external ear; primary oocyte; skin of abdomen; seminiferous tubule; zygote; skin of back; lumbar spinal ganglion; More reference expression data
BioGPS	n/a
Gene ontology
Molecular function	iron ion binding; oxidoreductase activity; heme binding; oxidoreductase activity, acting on paired donors, with incorporation or reduction of molecular oxygen; metal ion binding; monooxygenase activity
Cellular component	organelle membrane; endoplasmic reticulum membrane; endoplasmic reticulum; membrane; intracellular membrane-bounded organelle
Biological process	icosanoid metabolic process
Sources:Amigo / QuickGO
Orthologs
Databases	NCBI: entry; OMA: entry
Species	Human	Mouse
Entrez	126410	320997
Ensembl	ENSG00000171954	ENSMUSG00000061126
UniProt	Q6NT55	Q8BGU0
RefSeq (mRNA)	NM_173483	NM_177307
RefSeq (protein)	NP_775754	NP_796281
Location (UCSC)	Chr 19: 15.51 – 15.55 Mb	Chr 17: 32.67 – 32.71 Mb
PubMed search
- Wikidata
View/Edit Human	View/Edit Mouse

CYP4F22 (cytochrome P450, family 4, subfamily F, polypeptide 22) is a protein that in humans is encoded by the CYP4F22 gene.

This gene encodes a member of the cytochrome P450 superfamily of enzymes. The cytochrome P450 proteins are monooxygenases which catalyze many reactions involved in drug metabolism and synthesis of cholesterol, steroids and other lipids. This gene is part of a cluster of cytochrome P450 genes on chromosome 19 and encodes an enzyme thought to play a role in the 12(R)-lipoxygenase pathway. Mutations in this gene are the cause of ichthyosis lamellar type 3.

== Function ==
CYP4F22 is a Cytochrome P450 omega hydroxylase, an enzyme that catalyzes the omega oxidation of fatty acids by introducing a hydroxyl group at the terminal (omega) position. In general, omega hydroxylation may: (a) generate biologically active signaling molecules (e.g. conversion of arachidonic acid to 20-Hydroxyeicosatetraenoic acid), (b) inactivate bioactive lipids (e.g. metabolism of 5-oxo-eicosatetraenoic acid to its ~100-fold less potent 5-oxo-20-hydroxy-eicosatetraenoic acid), or (c) initiate further metabolism of xenobiotics and endogenous compounds. CYP4F22 primarily fulfills the latter role.

CYP4F22 is a type I integral membrane protein localized to the endoplasmic reticulum of keratinocytes in the stratum granulosum of mammalian skin. Its specific substrates are exceptionally long fatty acids (≥C28), known as very long chain fatty acids (VLCFA). These VLCFA can exist as free fatty acids or be amide-linked to sphingosine to form acylceramide precursors.

The enzyme hydroxylates VLCFA within esterified omega-oxyacyl-sphingosine complexes, producing omega-hydroxyacyl-sphingosine derivatives. This modification is essential for trafficking these highly hydrophobic, wax-like VLCFA into the stratum corneum, where they are incorporated into the extracellular lipid matrix. These specialized lipids provide the physical basis of the skin’s water-impermeability barrier.

Although CYP4F22, like other CYP4F isoforms, may have additional metabolic roles, its critical and well-defined function is in omega-hydroxylation of VLCFA for skin barrier formation, as confirmed by genetic and biochemical studies.

== Clinical significance ==
A small number of newborns with Congenital ichthyosiform erythroderma have been found to have autosomal recessive lose of function mutations in CYP4F22. Of the varies subtypes of congenital ichthyosiform erythroderma, these mutations have been associated almost exclusively with the Lamellar ichthyosis subtype.
