= HX3 =

HX3 may refer to:

- a hepoxilin
- HX3 postcode, one of the postcodes in the area of Halifax
