= C20H32O5 =

The molecular formula C_{20}H_{32}O_{5} (molar mass: 352.465 g/mol) may refer to:

- Levuglandin D2
- Levuglandin E2
- Lipoxin
- Prostacyclin
- Prostaglandin D2
- Prostaglandin E2, an abortifacient
- Prostaglandin H2
- Thromboxane A2
