= KTG =

KTG may refer to:

- Keratinocyte transglutaminase, an enzyme
- Ketapang Airport, IATA code
- kinetic theory of gases, in Physics
