= Nonclassic eicosanoid =

Nonclassic eicosanoids are biologically active signaling molecules made by oxygenation of twenty-carbon fatty acids other than the classic eicosanoids.

== Terminology ==
"Eicosanoid" is the collective term for oxygenated derivatives of three different 20-carbon essential fatty acids—Eicosapentaenoic acid (EPA), Arachidonic acid (AA) and Dihomo-gamma-linolenic acid (DGLA).

Current usage limits the term to the leukotrienes (LT) and three types of prostanoids—prostaglandins (PG) prostacyclins (PGI), and thromboxanes (TX). However, several other classes can technically be termed eicosanoid, including the eoxins, hepoxilins, resolvins, isofurans, isoprostanes, lipoxins, epi-lipoxins, epoxyeicosatrienoic acids (EETs) and endocannabinoids. LTs and prostanoids are sometimes termed 'classic eicosanoids' in contrast to the 'novel', 'nonclassic' or 'eicosanoid-like' eicosanoids.

The classic eicosanoids are autocrine and paracrine mediators, active at micromolar concentrations (or lower), produced with high stereospecificity. They are produced from EFAs (chiefly AA) from either cyclooxygenase (COX) or 5-lipoxygenase.

Broadly, the nonclassic eicosanoids are the products of 20-carbon EFAs and

- Other oxygenation enzymes, (eoxins, hepoxilins, resolvins, lipoxins, epi-lipoxins, epoxyeicosatrienoic acids (EETs));
- Uncatalyzed oxygenation reactions, (isofurans, isoprostanes, phytoprostanes);
- Addition reactions other than oxygenation (endocannabinoids).

Also included are

- Side products from the classic eicosanoid biosynthesis, (levuglandins, Oxoeicosanoids);
- Reactions between other fatty acids and these pathways (the COX products of pinolenic and mead acid).

== See also ==
- Docosanoids
