= ALOXE3 =

Protein-coding gene in the species Homo sapiens

Identifiers
- Aliases: ALOXE3, ARCI3, E-LOX, eLOX-3, eLOX3, arachidonate lipoxygenase 3
- External IDs: OMIM: 607206; MGI: 1345140; GeneCards: ALOXE3
Enzyme activity
EC #	BRENDA	ExPASy	KEGG	MetaCyc
4.2.1.152	↗	↗	↗	↗
5.4.4.7	↗	↗	↗	↗

Gene location (Human)
Chr.	Chromosome 17 (human)
Band	17p13.1	Start	8,095,900 bp
Band	17p13.1	End	8,119,047 bp

Gene location (Mouse)
Chr.	Chromosome 11 (mouse)
Band	11 B3|11 42.38 cM	Start	69,125,896 bp
Band	11 B3|11 42.38 cM	End	69,149,115 bp
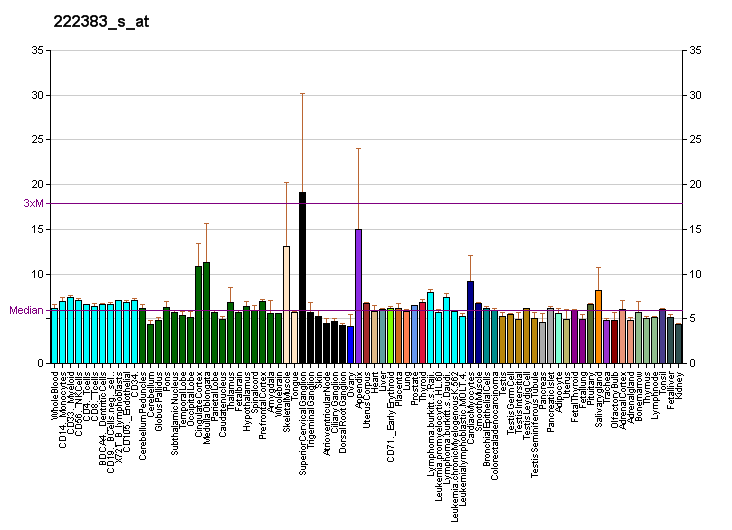

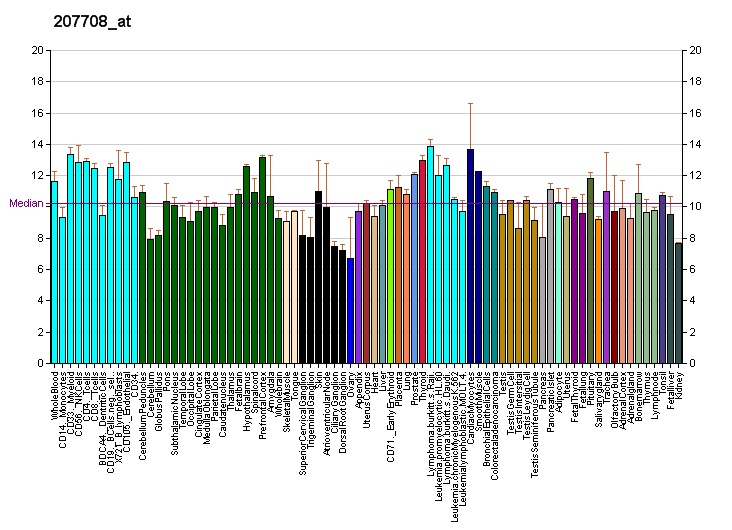
RNA expression pattern
Bgee	Human / Mouse (ortholog); Top expressed in: skin of leg; skin of abdomen; secondary oocyte; skin of arm; skin of thigh; testicle; nipple; cerebellar hemisphere; right hemisphere of cerebellum; human penis / Top expressed in: esophagus; lip; skin of external ear; right ventricle; perirhinal cortex; entorhinal cortex; gastrula; embryo; dentate gyrus of hippocampal formation granule cell; primary visual cortex; More reference expression data
BioGPS	More reference expression data
Gene ontology
Molecular function	iron ion binding; isomerase activity; dioxygenase activity; metal ion binding; protein binding; lyase activity; oxidoreductase activity; oxidoreductase activity, acting on single donors with incorporation of molecular oxygen, incorporation of two atoms of oxygen; hepoxilin A3 synthase activity
Cellular component	cytoplasm; cytosol
Biological process	linoleic acid metabolic process; establishment of skin barrier; lipid metabolism; peroxisome proliferator activated receptor signaling pathway; ceramide biosynthetic process; fatty acid metabolic process; hepoxilin biosynthetic process; sensory perception of pain; arachidonic acid metabolic process; fat cell differentiation; sphingolipid metabolic process; lipoxygenase pathway
Sources:Amigo / QuickGO
Orthologs
Databases	NCBI: entry; OMA: entry
Species	Human	Mouse
Entrez	59344	23801
Ensembl	ENSG00000179148	ENSMUSG00000020892
UniProt	Q9BYJ1	Q9WV07
RefSeq (mRNA)	NM_021628; NM_001165960; NM_001369446	NM_011786
RefSeq (protein)	NP_001159432; NP_067641; NP_001356375	NP_035916
Location (UCSC)	Chr 17: 8.1 – 8.12 Mb	Chr 11: 69.13 – 69.15 Mb
PubMed search
- Wikidata
View/Edit Human	View/Edit Mouse

Epidermis-type lipoxygenase 3 (ALOXE3 or eLOX3) is a member of the lipoxygenase family of enzymes; in humans, it is encoded by the ALOXE3 gene. This gene is located on chromosome 17 at position 13.1 where it forms a cluster with two other lipoxygenases, ALOX12B and ALOX15B. Among the human lipoxygenases, ALOXE3 is most closely (54% identity) related in amino acid sequence to ALOX12B. ALOXE3, ALOX12B, and ALOX15B are often classified as epidermal lipoxygenases, in distinction to the other three human lipoxygenases (ALOX5, ALOX12, and ALOX15), because they were initially defined as being highly or even exclusively expressed and functioning in skin. The epidermis-type lipoxygenases are now regarded as a distinct subclass within the multigene family of mammalian lipoxygenases with mouse Aloxe3 (also termed e-Lox-3) being the ortholog to human ALOXE3, mouse Alox12b being the ortholog to human ALOX12B (MIM 603741), and mouse Alox8 being the ortholog to human ALOX15B (MIM 603697)[supplied by OMIM]. ALOX12B and ALOXE3 in humans, Alox12b and Aloxe3 in mice, and comparable orthologs in other in other species are proposed to act sequentially in a multistep metabolic pathway that forms products that are structurally critical for creating and maintaining the skin's water barrier function.

== Tissue distribution ==
Immunologically detected ALOXE3 and ALOX12B in humans and Aloxe3 and Alox12b in mice have a similar tissue distribution in being highly expressed in the outer, differentiated layers of the epidermis; they co-localize at the surface of keratinocytes in the stratum granulosum of mouse skin and during mouse embryogenesis appear concurrently at the onset of skin development at day 15.5. ALOXE3 mRNA in humans was also detected at low levels in the pancreas, ovary, brain, testis, placenta, and some secretory epithelia. Aloxe3 and Alox12b mRNA was detected in the tongue, forestomach, trachea, brain, testis, and adipose tissue of mice and in the spinal cord of rats.

== Activity ==
ALOXE3 is an atypical lipoxygenase in that under most but not all experimental conditions, it lacks the dioxygenase activity that converts polyunsaturated fatty acids (PUFAs) to hydroperoxide metabolites; rather, it possess hepoxilin synthase (i.e. hydroperoxy isomerase) activity — that is, it converts hydroperoxy-containing PUFAs to hepoxilin-like epoxyalcohol products. These products, unlike those formed by non-enzymatic transformations, are specific isomers with just one form of the chiral hydroxy and epoxy residues. ALOX3E metabolizes 12R-HpETE to 8R-hydroxy-11R,12R-epoxy-eicosatrienoic acid and metabolizes 9R-HpODE to products that contain either an epoxyalcohol or a ketone residue. It exhibits relatively weak activity in conducting this conversion on free 9R-HODE but stronger activity when 9R-HpODE is presented as its methyl ester. ALOXE3's primary function in epidermal tissue appears to be to metabolize the 9R-HpODE moiety that is not free but rather esterified to certain ceramide lipids.

Linoleic acid is the most abundant fatty acid in the skin epidermis, being present mainly esterified to the omega-hydroxyl residue of amide-linked omega-hydroxylated very long chain fatty acids (VLCFAs) in a unique class of ceramides termed esterified omega-hydroxyacyl-sphingosine (EOS). EOS is an intermediate component in a proposed multi-step metabolic pathway which delivers very long-chain fatty acids (VLCFAs) to the cornified lipid envelope in the skin's stratum corneum; the presence of these wax-like, hydrophobic VLCFAs is needed to maintain the skin's integrity and functionality as a water barrier (see Lung microbiome#Role of the epithelial barrier). ALOX12B metabolizes the LA in EOS to its 9R-hydroperoxy derivative which ALOXE3 then converts to three ceramide-esterified products: a) 9R,10R-trans-epoxide,13R-hydroxy-10E-octadecenoic acid, b) 9-keto-10E,12Z-octadecadienoic acid, and c) 9R,10R-trans-epoxy-13-keto-11E-octadecenoic acid. The ALOX12B/ALOE3-oxidized products, it is proposed, signal for their hydrolysis (i.e. removal) from EOS; this allows the multi-step metabolic pathway to proceed in delivering the VLCFAs to the cornified lipid envelop in the skin's Stratum corneum.

AloxE3 appears responsible for forming hepoxilins A and/or B from 12R-HpETE in the spinal fluids of rats and ALOXE3 is proposed to be responsible for the formation of these hepoxilins in various human tissues although the presence and activity of ALOXE3 in many of these hepoxilin-forming tissues has not yet been demonstrated.

Spinal Aloxe3, apparently through its ability to make hepoxilins, appears responsible for the hyperalgesia which accompanies inflammation in rats.

Aloxe3 appears necessary and sufficient for the differentiation of mouse 3T3-L1 fibroblast cells into adipocytes (i.e. fat cells); the function of Aloxe3 in this differentiation appears to be to its metabolism 12R-HpETE into hepoxilins A3 or B3 which directly activate(s) Peroxisome proliferator-activated receptor gamma which in turn initiates the expression of adipocyte-differentiation genes.

== Clinical significance ==
=== Congenital ichthyosiform erythrodema ===
Deletions of Alox12b or Aloxe3 genes by gene knockout in mice cause a congenital scaly skin disease which is characterized by a greatly reduced skin water barrier function and other features found in the autosomal recessive nonbullous Congenital ichthyosiform erythroderma (ARCI) disease of humans.; homozygous recessive deleterious mutations in ALOXE3 or ALOX12B are likewise causes, albeit rare, of this congenital disease in humans. ARCI refers to nonsyndromic (i.e. not associated with other signs or symptoms) congenital Ichthyosis including Harlequin-type ichthyosis, Lamellar ichthyosis, and Congenital ichthyosiform erythroderma. ARCI has an incidence of about 1/200,000 in European and North American populations; 40 different mutations in ALOX12B and 13 different mutations in ALOXE3 genes account for a total of about 10% of ARCI cases; these mutations are homozygous recessive (see Dominance (genetics)), cause a total loss of ALOX12B or ALOXE3 function (see mutations), and can be associated with any of the three cited forms of the disease.

=== Hepoxilin synthase ===
In mice lacking Aloxe3 activity due to gene knockout of the Alox3 gene, levels in skin of hepoxilins A3 and B3, as well as their metabolites, trioxilins A3 and B3, are greatly reduced. Furthermore, rat Aloxe3 has been implicated in the production of hepoxilin B3 in studies that transfected its gene into cultured HEK 293 cells and similarly implicated in the inflammation-induced production of hepoxilin B3 in the spine of rats as well as the perception of pain (i.e. allodynia) by these animals using pharmacological inhibitor and siRNA-based gene knockdown studies. Finally, cultured human skin cells, which are rich in ALOXE3 readily convert arachidonic acid as well as 12S-hydroperoxy-eicosatetraenoic acid to Hepoxilin B3; this production, in keeping with the higher content of ALOXE3, is far greater in the skin cells isolated from subjects with psoriasis. These results suggest that ALOXE3 and its orthologs contribute greatly to or are the hepoxylin synthase activity responsible for producing bioactive hepoxilins (see hepoxilin) in the skin and other ALOXE3/ortholog-rich tissues of mammals, possibly including humans.

ALOXE3 may be a key effector of the therapeutic response to fasting. Expressing ALOXE3 specifically in hepatocytes (liver parenchymal cells) retards weight gain and hepatic steatosis (fatty liver) in mice rendered obese by feeding them a high-fat/high-sugar diet and in the db/db mouse, which overeats due to a mutation in the leptin receptor. In these mice, ALOXE3 overexpression stimulates higher basal thermogenesis and cuts the link between obesity and insulin resistance. Some of these effects are recapitulated when ALOXE3 is activated by the sugar alcohol trehalose and its degradation-resistant analog lactotrehalose. The mechanism appears to be through ALOXE3's synthesis of the eicosanoid 12-KETE in hepatocytes, which act as a ligand for the insulin-sensitizing nuclear receptor peroxisome proliferator-activated receptor gamma (PPAR-γ), the target of the thiazolidinedione class of diabetes drugs. A caution about the human relevance of these findings is that humans with elevated of trehalose in their serum were found to be at elevated risk of incident diabetes.

=== Other possible clinical significances ===
The distribution of ALOXE3 suggests that this lipoxygenase may serve functions not only in the skin but also in other tissues. The pain perception and adipocyte differentiation activities of Aloxe3 in rodents might also occur in humans.

== Toxicity ==
Intrauterine delivery of eLox3 to mice at gestational day 14.5 resulted in fetal growth restriction and intrauterine death, apparently due to a strongly negative effect on placental development.
