= Hepoxilin =

Hepoxilin A3

Names
- IUPAC name (5Z,9E)-8-hydroxy-10-[(2S,3S)-3-[(Z)-oct-2-enyl]oxiran-2-yl]deca-5,9-dienoic acid
- Other names HXA3

Identifiers
| CAS Number | HxA3: 94161-11-2; HxA4: 103188-13-2; HxB4: 103188-12-1 |
| 3D model (JSmol) | HxA3: Interactive image; HxB3: Interactive image; HxA4: Interactive image; HxB4: Interactive image |
| ChEBI | HxA3: CHEBI:36190; HxB3: CHEBI:34784 |
| ChemSpider | HxA3: 3460; HxB3: 32817456; HxA4: 4943387 |
| KEGG | HxA3: C14808; HxB3: C14810 |
| PubChem CID | HxA3: 5283211; HxB3: 16759353; HxA4: 6438949; HxB4: 6438955 |
| UNII | HxA3: BSO00N6UES |
| CompTox Dashboard (EPA) | HxA3: DTXSID40950873 |
- InChI: InChI=1S/C20H32O4/c1-2-3-4-5-6-10-13-18-19(24-18)16-15-17(21)12-9-7-8-11-14-20(22)23/h6-7,9-10,15-19,21H,2-5,8,11-14H2,1H3,(H,22,23)/b9-7-,10-6-,16-15+/t17?,18-,19-/m0/s1 Key: SGTUOBURCVMACZ-SEVPPISGSA-N; HxB3: InChI=1S/C20H32O4/c1-2-3-4-5-9-12-15-18-20(24-18)17(21)14-11-8-6-7-10-13-16-19(22)23/h6-7,9,11-12,14,17-18,20-21H,2-5,8,10,13,15-16H2,1H3,(H,22,23)/b7-6-,12-9-,14-11-/t17?,18-,20-/m0/s1 Key: DWNBPRRXEVJMPO-RNGYDEEPSA-N; HxA4: InChI=1S/C20H30O4/c1-2-3-4-5-6-10-13-18-19(24-18)16-15-17(21)12-9-7-8-11-14-20(22)23/h3-4,6-7,9-10,15-19,21H,2,5,8,11-14H2,1H3,(H,22,23)/b4-3+,9-7+,10-6+,16-15+ Key: GBSGALHVICSTLU-AXVKERTGSA-N; HxB4: InChI=1S/C20H30O4/c1-3-5-13-17(12-4-2)20(16-24-20)18(21)14-10-8-6-7-9-11-15-19(22)23/h3,6-7,10,13-14,17-18,21H,4,8-9,11-12,15-16H2,1-2H3,(H,22,23)/b7-6-,14-10-/t5?,17?,18-,20-/m1/s1 Key: PKQPMJAEXYJODX-ZOEAWLPESA-N
- SMILES: HxA3: CCCCCC=CCC1C(O1)C=CC(CC=CCCCC(=O)O)O; HxB3: CCCCC/C=C\C[C@H]1[C@@H](O1)C(/C=C\C/C=C\CCCC(=O)O)O; HxA4: CC/C=C/C/C=C/CC1C(O1)/C=C/C(C/C=C/CCCC(=O)O)O; HxB4: CCCC(C=C=CC)[C@]1(CO1)[C@@H](/C=C\C/C=C\CCCC(=O)O)O

Properties
| Chemical formula | C_{20}H_{32}O_{4} |
| Molar mass | 336.472 g·mol^{−1} |
- Except where otherwise noted, data are given for materials in their standard state (at 25 °C [77 °F], 100 kPa). verify (what is ?) Infobox references

Hepoxilins (Hx) are a set of epoxyalcohol metabolites of polyunsaturated fatty acids (PUFA), i.e. they possess both an epoxide and an alcohol (i.e. hydroxyl) residue. HxA3, HxB3, and their non-enzymatically formed isomers are nonclassic eicosanoid derived from acid the (PUFA), arachidonic acid. A second group of less well studied hepoxilins, HxA4, HxB4, and their non-enzymatically formed isomers are nonclassical eicosanoids derived from the PUFA, eicosapentaenoic acid. Recently, 14,15-HxA3 and 14,15-HxB3 have been defined as arachidonic acid derivatives that are produced by a different metabolic pathway than HxA3, HxB3, HxA4, or HxB4 and differ from the aforementioned hepoxilins in the positions of their hydroxyl and epoxide residues. Finally, hepoxilin-like products of two other PUFAs, docosahexaenoic acid and linoleic acid, have been described. All of these epoxyalcohol metabolites are at least somewhat unstable and are readily enzymatically or non-enzymatically to their corresponding trihydroxy counterparts, the trioxilins (TrX). HxA3 and HxB3, in particular, are being rapidly metabolized to TrXA3, TrXB3, and TrXC3. Hepoxilins have various biological activities in animal models and/or cultured mammalian (including human) tissues and cells. The TrX metabolites of HxA3 and HxB3 have less or no activity in most of the systems studied but in some systems retain the activity of their precursor hepoxilins. Based on these studies, it has been proposed that the hepoxilins and trioxilins function in human physiology and pathology by, for example, promoting inflammation responses and dilating arteries to regulate regional blood flow and blood pressure.

== History ==
HxA3 and HxB3 were first identified, named, shown to have biological activity in stimulating insulin secretion in cultured rat pancreatic islets of Langerhans in Canada in 1984 by CR Pace-Asciak and JM Martin. Shortly thereafter, Pace-Asciak identified, named, and showed to have insulin secretagogue activity HxA4 and HxB4.

== Nomenclature ==
HxA3, HxB3, and their isomers are distinguished from most other eicosanoids (i.e. signaling molecules made by oxidation of 20-carbon fatty acids) in that they contain both epoxide and hydroxyl residues; they are structurally differentiated in particular from two other classes of arachidonic acid-derived eicosanoids, the leukotrienes and lipoxins, in that they lack conjugated double bonds. HxA4 and HxB4 are distinguished from HxA3 and HxB3 by possessing four rather than three double bonds. The 14,15-HxA3 and 14,15-HxB3 non-classical eicosanoids are distinguished from the aforementioned hepoxilins in that they are formed by a different metabolic pathway and differ in the positioning of their epoxide and hydroxyl residues. Two other classes of epoxyalcohol fatty acids, those derived from the 22-carbon polyunsaturated fatty acid, docosahexaenoic acid, and the 18-carbon fatty acid, linoleic acid, are distinguished from the aforementioned hepoxilins by their carbon chain length; they are termed hepoxilin-like rather than hepoxilins. A hepoxilin-like derivative of linoleic acid is formed on linoleic acid that is esterified to a sphingosine in a complex lipid termed esterified omega-hydroxylacyl-sphingosin (EOS).

=== Note on nomenclature ambiguities ===
The full structural identities of the hepoxilins and hepoxilin-like compounds in most studies are unclear in two important respects. First, the R versus S chirality of their hydroxy residue in the initial and most studies thereafter is undefined and therefore given with, for example, HxB3 as 10R/S-hydroxy or just 10-hydroxy. Second, the R,S versus S,R chirality of the epoxide residue in these earlier studies likewise goes undefined and given with, for example, HxB3 as 11,12-epoxide. While some later studies have defined the chirality of these residues for the products they isolated, it is often not clear that the earlier studies dealt with products that had exactly the same or a different chirality at these residues.

== Biochemistry ==
Hepoxilins, such as HxA3 and HxB3, are metabolic intermediates derived from the polyunsaturated fatty acid (PUFA), arachidonic acid. They possess both an epoxide and a hydroxyl residue. As metabolic intermediates, hepoxilins play several roles in human physiology and pathology. They have various biological activities in animal models and/or cultured mammalian (including human) tissues and cells. For example, they have been implicated in promoting the neutrophil-based inflammatory response to various bacteria in the intestines and lungs of rodents.

=== Production ===
Human HxA3 and HxB3 are formed in a two-step reaction. First, molecular oxygen (O_{2}) is added to carbon 12 of arachidonic acid (i.e. 5Z,8Z,11Z,14Z-eicosatetraenoic acid) and concurrently the 11Z double bond in this arachidonate moves to the 10E position to form the intermediate product, 12S-hydroperoxy-5Z,8Z,10E,14Z-eicosatetraenoic acid (i.e. 12S-hydroperoxyeicosatetraenoic acid or 12S-HpETE). Second, 12S-HpETE is converted to the hepoxilin products, HxA3 (i.e. 8R/S-hydroxy-11,12-oxido-5Z,9E,14Z-eicosatrienoic acid) and HxB3 (i.e. 10R/S-hydroxy-11,12-oxido-5Z,8Z,14Z-eicosatrienoic acid). This two-step metabolic reaction is illustrated below:

5Z,8Z,11Z,14Z-eicosatetraenoic acid + O_{2} → 12S-hydroperoxy-5Z,8Z,10E,14Z-eicosatetraenoic acid → 8R/S-hydroxy-11,12-oxido-5Z,9E,14Z-eicosatrienoic acid + 10R/S-hydroxy-11,12-oxido-5Z,8Z,14Z-eicosatrienoic acid

The second step in this reaction, the conversion of 12(S)-HpETE to HxA3 and HxB3, may be catalyzed by ALOX12 as an intrinsic property of the enzyme. Based on gene knockout studies, however, the epidermal lipoxygenase, ALOXE3, or more correctly, its mouse ortholog Aloxe3, appears responsible for converting 12(S)-HpETE to HxB3 in mouse skin and spinal tissue. It is suggested that ALOXE3 contributes in part or whole to the production of HxB3 and perhaps other hepoxilins by tissues where it is expressed such as the skin. Furthermore, hydroperoxide-containing unsaturated fatty acids can rearrange non-enzymatically to form a variety of epoxyalcohol isomers. The 12(S)-HpETE formed in tissues, it is suggested, may similar rearrange non-enzymatically to form HxA3 and HXB3. Unlike the products made by ALOX12 and ALOXE3, which are stereospecific in forming only HxA3 and HxB3, however, this non-enzymatic production of hepoxilins may form a variety of hepoxilin isomers and occur as an artifact of tissue processing. Finally, cellular peroxidases readily and rapidly reduce 12(S)-HpETE to its hydroxyl analog, 12S-hydroxy-5Z,8Z,10E,14Z-eicosatetraenoic acid (12S-HETE; see 12-hydroxyeicosatetraenoic acid; this reaction competes with the hepoxilin-forming reaction and in cells expressing very high peroxidase activity may be responsible for blocking the formation of the hepoxilins.

ALOX15 is responsible for metabolizing arachidonic acid to 14,15-HxA3 and 14,15-HxB3 as indicated in the following two-step reaction which first forms 15(S)-hydroperoxy-5Z,8Z,11Z,13E-eicosatetraenoic acid (15S-HpETE) and then two specific isomers of 11S/R-hydroxy-14S,15S-epoxy-5Z,8Z,12E-eicosatrienoic acid (i.e. 14,15-HxA3) and 13S/R)-hydroxy-14S,15S-epoxy-5Z,8Z,11Z-eicosatrienoic acid (i.e. 14,15-HxB3):

5Z,8Z,11Z,14Z-eicosatetraenoic acid + O_{2} → 15(S)-hydroperoxy-5Z,8Z,11Z,13E-eicosatetraenoic acid → 11R-hydroxy-14S,15 S-epoxy-5Z,8Z,12E-eicosatrienoic acid and 13R-hydroxy-14S,15S-epoxy-5Z,8Z,11Z-eicosatrienoic acid

ALOX15 appears capable of conducting both steps in this reaction although further studies may show that ALOXE3, non-enzymatic rearrangements, and the reduction of 15S-HpETE to 15(S)-hydroxy-5Z,8Z,11Z,13E-eicosatetraenoic acid (i.e. 15S-HETE; see 15-hydroxyicosatetraenoic acid) may be involved in the production of 14,15-HxA3 and 14,15-HxB3 as they are in that of HxA3 and HxB3.

Production of the hepoxilin-like metabolites of docosahexaenoic acid, 7R/S-hydroxy-10,11-epoxy-4Z,7E,13Z,16Z,19Z-docosapentaenoic acid (i.e. 7-hydroxy-bis-α-dihomo-HxA5) and 10-hydroxy-13,14-epoxy-4Z,7EZ,11E,16Z,19Z-docosapentaenoic acid (i.e. 10-hydroxy-bis-α-dihomo-HxA5) was formed (or inferred to be formed based on the formation of their tihydroxy metabolites (see trioxilins, below) as a result of adding docosahexaenoic acid to the pineal gland or hippocampus isolated from rats; the pathway(s) making these products has not been described.

A hepoxilin-like metabolite of linoleic acid forms in the skin of humans and rodents. This hepoxilin is esterified to sphinganine in a lipid complex termed EOS i.e. esterified omega-hydroxyacyl-sphingosine (see Lipoxygenase § Human lipoxygenases) that also contains a very long chain fatty acid. In this pathway, ALOX12B metabolizes the esterified linoleic acid to its 9R-hydroperoxy derivative and then ALOXE3 metabolizes this intermediate to its 13R-hydroxy-9R,10R-epoxy product. The pathway functions to deliver very long chain fatty acids to the cornified lipid envelope of the skin surface.

=== Further metabolism ===
HxA3 is extremely unstable and HxB3 is moderately unstable, rapidly decomposing to their tri-hydroxy products, for example, during isolation procedures that use an even mildly acidic methods; they are also rapidly metabolized enzymatically in cells to these same tri-hydroxy products, termed trioxilins (TrX's) or trihydroxyeicoxatrienoic acids (THETA's); HxA3 is converted to 8,11,12-trihydroxy-5Z,9E,14Z-eicosatrienoic acid (trioxilin A3 or TrXA3) while HxB3 is converted to 10,11,12-trihydroxy-5Z,8Z,14Z-eicosatrienoic acid (trioxilin B3 or TrXB3). A third trihydroxy acid, 8,9,12-trihydroxy-5Z,10E,14Z eicosatrienoic acid (trioxilin C3 or TrXC3), has been detected in rabbit and mouse aorta tissue incubated with arachidonic acid. The metabolism of HxA3 to TrXA3 and HXB3 to TrX is accomplished by soluble epoxide hydrolase in mouse liver; since it is widely distributed in various tissues of various mammalian species, including humans, soluble epoxide hydrolase may be the principal enzyme responsible for metabolizing these and perhaps other hepoxilin compounds. It seems possible, however, that other similarly acting epoxide hydrolases such as microsomal epoxide hydrolase or epoxide hydrolase 2 may prove to hepoxilin hydrolase activity. While the trihydroxy products of hepoxilin synthesis are generally considered to be inactive and the sEH pathway therefore considered as functioning to limiting the actions of the hepoxilins, some studies found that TrXA3, TrXB3, and TrXC3 were more powerful than HxA3 in relaxing pre-contracted mouse arteries and that TrXC3 was a relatively potent relaxer of rabbit pre-contracted aorta.

HxA3 was converted through a Michael addition catalyzed by glutathione transferase to its glutathione conjugate, HxA3-C, i.e., 11-glutathionyl-HxA3, in a cell-free system or in homogenates of rat brain hippocampus tissue; HxA3-C proved to be a potent stimulator of membrane hyperpolarization in rat hippocampal CA1 neurons. This formation of hepoxilin A3-C appears analogous to the formation of leukotriene C4 by the conjugation of glutathione to leukotriene A4. Glutathione conjugates of 14,15-HxA3 and 14,15-HxB3 have also been detected the human Hodgkin disease Reed–Sternberg cell line, L1236.

HxB3 and TrX3 are found esterified into the sn-2 position of phospholipid in human psoriasis lesions and samples of human psoriatic skin acylate HxBw and TrX2 into these phospholipids in vitro.

== Physiological effects ==
Virtually all of the biological studies on hepoxilins have been conducted in animals or in vitro on animal and human tissues, However, these studies give species-specific different results which complicate their relevancy to humans. The useful translation of these studies to human physiology, pathology, and clinical medicine and therapies requires much further study.

=== Inflammation ===
HxA3 and HxB3 possess pro-inflammatory actions in, for example, stimulating human neutrophil chemotaxis and increasing the permeability of skin capillaries. Studies in humans have found that the amount of HxB3 is >16-fold higher in psoriatic lesions than normal epidermis. It is present in psoriatic scales at ~10 micromolar, a concentration which is able to exert biologic effects; HxB3 was not detected in these tissues although its present was strongly indicated by the presence of its metabolite, TrXB3, at relatively high levels in psoriatic scales but not normal epidermal tissue. These results suggest that the pro-inflammatory effects of HxA3 and HxB3 may contribute to the inflammatory response that accompanies psoriasis and perhaps other inflammatory skin conditions. HxA3 has also been implicating in promoting the neutrophil-based inflammatory response to various bacteria in the intestines and lungs of rodents.; this allows that this hepoxilin may also promote the inflammatory response of humans in other tissues, particularly those with a mucosa surface, besides the skin. In addition, HxA3 and a synthetic analog of HxB3, PBT-3, induce human neutrophils to produce neutrophil extracellular traps, i.e. DNA-rich extracellular fibril matrixes able to kill extracellular pathogens while minimizing tissue; hence these hepoxilins may contribute to innate immunity by being responsible of the direct killing of pathogens.

=== Circulation ===
In addition to 12S-HETE and 12R-HETE (see 12-HETE § Blood pressure), HxA3, TrXA3, and TrXC3 but neither HxB3 nor TrXB3 relax mouse mesentery arteries pre-contracted by thromboxane A2 (TXA2). Mechanistically, these metabolites form in the vascular endothelium, move to the underlining smooth muscle, and reverse the smooth muscle contraction caused by TXA2 by functioning as a receptor antagonist, i.e. they competitively inhibit the binding of TXA2 to its thromboxane receptor, α isoform. In contrast, 15-lipoxygenase-derived epoxyalcohol and trihydroxy metabolites of arachidonic acid viz., 15-hydroxy-11,12-epoxyeicosatrienoic acid, 13-hydroxy-14,15-epoxy-eicosatrienoic acid (a 14,15-HxA4 isomer), and 11,12,15-trihydroxyeicosatrienoic acid dilate rabbit aorta by an endothelium-derived hyperpolarizing factor (EDHF) mechanism, i.e. they form in the vessels endothelium, move to underlying smooth muscles, and trigger a response of hyperpolarization-induced relaxation by binding to and thereby opening their apamin-sensitive small conductance (SK) calcium-activated potassium channels. The cited metabolites may use one or the other of these two mechanisms in different vascular beds and in different animal species to contribute in regulating regional blood flow and blood pressure. While the role of these metabolites in the human vasculature has not been studied, 12S-HETE, 12R-HETE, HxA3, TrXA3, and TrXC3 do inhibit the binding of TXA2 to the human thromboxane receptor.

=== Pain perception ===
HXA3 and HXB3 appear responsible for hyperalgesia and tactile allodynia (pain caused by a normally non-painful stimulus) response of mice to skin inflammation. In this model, the hepoxilins are released in spinal cord and directly activate TRPV1 and TRPA1 receptors to augment the perception of pain. TRPV1 (the transient receptor potential cation channel subfamily V member 1 (TrpV1), also termed the capsaicin receptor or vanilloid receptor) and TRPA1 (Transient receptor potential cation channel, member A1) are plasma membrane ion channels on cells; these channels are known to be involved in the perception of pain caused by exogenous and endogenous physical and chemical stimuli in a wide range of animal species including humans.

=== Oxidative stress ===
Cultured rat RINm5F pancreatic islet cells undergoing oxidative stress secrete HxB3; HxB3 (and HxA3) in turn upregulates peroxidase enzymes which act to decrease this stress; it is proposed that this HxB3-triggered induction of oxidases constitutes a general compensatory defense response used by a variety of cells to protect their vitality and functionality.

=== Insulin secretion ===
The insulin-secreting actions of HxA3 and HxB3 on isolate rat pancreatic islet cells involves their ability to increase or potentiate the insulin-secreting activity of glucose, requires very high concentrations (e.g. 2 micromolar) of the hepoxilins, and has not been extended to intact animals or humans.

Hepoxilins are also produced in the brain.
