= HODE =

HODE may refer to:

- 9-Hydroxyoctadecadienoic acid (9-HODE)
- 13-Hydroxyoctadecadienoic acid (13-HODE)

== See also ==
- Hode, Kentucky
