= Hode, Kentucky =

Unincorporated community in Kentucky, United States

- Unincorporated community
- Location within Kentucky Location within the United States
- Coordinates: 37°53′08″N 82°25′33″W
- Country: United States
- State: Kentucky
- County: Martin
- Elevation: 630 ft (190 m)
- Time zone: UTC-5 (Eastern (EST))
  - Summer (DST): UTC-4 (EDT)
- Area code: 606
- GNIS feature ID: 508260

Hode is an unincorporated community in Martin County, Kentucky, United States. Hode is located along the Tug Fork and Kentucky Route 292 2.9 miles (4.7 km) north-northwest of Warfield.

A post office was established in the community in 1921, and named for Hodeviah Hensley, the son of a local minister.
