= Ichthyosis with confetti =

Ichthyosis en confetti
- Other names: Ichthyosis with confetti, Congenital reticular ichthyosiform erythroderma and Ichthyosis variegata,
- Ichthyosis with confetti is inherited in an autosomal dominant manner
- Specialty: Dermatology

Ichthyosis en confetti, is a very rare form of congenital ichthyosis in which healthy patches of normal skin co-exist within the abnormal skin areas. The condition is caused by a frameshift mutation in the keratin 10 gene (KRT10); mutant keratin 10 accumulates in the nucleolus, a sub-nuclear structure, rather than within cellular intermediate filaments like the wild-type protein. Children with the condition exhibit red, flaky skin; however, for reasons not yet totally clear, wild type clonal patches of skin start to appear, in place of the red, flaky skin. Due to the clonal nature of the growth of the normal skin cells, it appears the patient is covered with confetti, hence the name of the condition. It has been hypothesized that this is the result of a combination of mitotic recombination and natural selection within the skin.

== See also ==
- List of cutaneous conditions caused by mutations in keratins
- List of cutaneous conditions
