= ALOX12B =

Protein-coding gene in the species Homo sapiens

Identifiers
- Aliases: ALOX12B, 12R-LOX, ARCI2, arachidonate 12-lipoxygenase, 12R type
- External IDs: OMIM: 603741; MGI: 1274782; GeneCards: ALOX12B

Gene location (Human)
Chr.	Chromosome 17 (human)
Band	17p13.1	Start	8,072,636 bp
Band	17p13.1	End	8,087,716 bp

Gene location (Mouse)
Chr.	Chromosome 11 (mouse)
Band	11 B3|11 42.38 cM	Start	69,047,815 bp
Band	11 B3|11 42.38 cM	End	69,060,618 bp
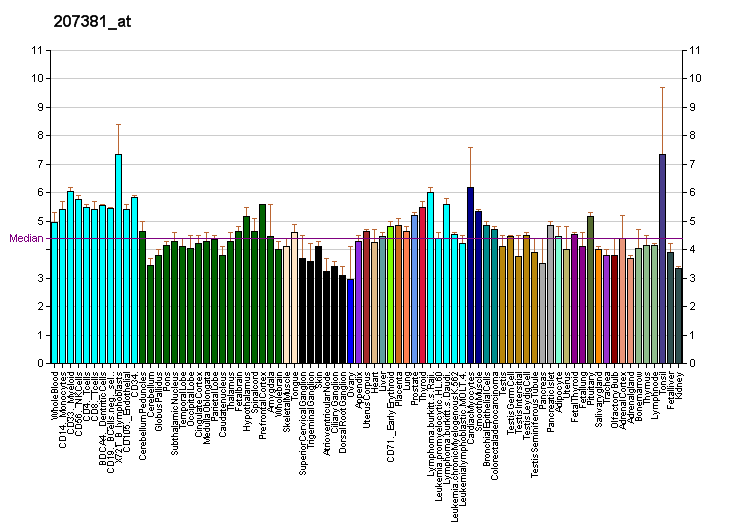
RNA expression pattern
Bgee	Human / Mouse (ortholog); Top expressed in: skin of leg; skin of abdomen; human penis; skin of thigh; vulva; skin of arm; gingival epithelium; cervix epithelium; skin of hip; nipple / Top expressed in: esophagus; superior surface of tongue; lip; umbilical cord; skin of external ear; skin of back; embryo; skin of abdomen; yolk sac; embryo; More reference expression data
BioGPS	More reference expression data
Gene ontology
Molecular function	iron ion binding; arachidonate 12(S)-lipoxygenase activity; dioxygenase activity; metal ion binding; protein binding; catalytic activity; oxidoreductase activity; oxidoreductase activity, acting on single donors with incorporation of molecular oxygen, incorporation of two atoms of oxygen; linoleate 9S-lipoxygenase activity
Cellular component	cytoplasm; cytosol
Biological process	linoleic acid metabolic process; establishment of skin barrier; lipid metabolism; ceramide biosynthetic process; fatty acid metabolic process; lipoxygenase pathway; hepoxilin biosynthetic process; positive regulation of gene expression; protein lipidation; positive regulation of mucus secretion; sphingolipid metabolic process; positive regulation of MAPK cascade; arachidonic acid metabolic process
Sources:Amigo / QuickGO
Orthologs
Databases	NCBI: entry; OMA: entry
Species	Human	Mouse
Entrez	242	11686
Ensembl	ENSG00000179477	ENSMUSG00000032807
UniProt	O75342	O70582
RefSeq (mRNA)	NM_001139	NM_009659
RefSeq (protein)	NP_001130	NP_033789
Location (UCSC)	Chr 17: 8.07 – 8.09 Mb	Chr 11: 69.05 – 69.06 Mb
PubMed search
- Wikidata
View/Edit Human	View/Edit Mouse

Arachidonate 12-lipoxygenase, 12R type, also known as ALOX12B, 12R-LOX, and arachidonate lipoxygenase 3, is a lipoxygenase-type enzyme composed of 701 amino acids and encoded by the ALOX12B gene. The gene is located on chromosome 17 at position 13.1 where it forms a cluster with two other lipoxygenases, ALOXE3 and ALOX15B. Among the human lipoxygenases, ALOX12B is most closely (54% identity) related in amino acid sequence to ALOXE3

== Activity ==
ALOX12B oxygenates arachidonic acid by adding molecular oxygen (O_{2}) in the form of a hydroperoxyl (HO_{2}) residue to its 12th carbon thereby forming 12(R)-hydroperoxy-5Z,8Z,10E,14Z-icosatetraenoic acid (also termed 12(R)-HpETE or 12R-HpETE). When formed in cells, 12R-HpETE may be quickly reduced to its hydroxyl analog (OH), 12(R)-hydroxy-5'Z,8Z,10E,14Z-eicosatetraenoic acid (also termed 12(R)-HETE or 12R-HETE), by ubiquitous peroxidase-type enzymes. These sequential metabolic reactions are:

arachidonic acid + O_{2} $\rightleftharpoons$ 12R-HpETE → 12R-HETE

ALOX12B is also capable of metabolizing free linoleic acid to 9(R)-hydroperoxy-10(E),12(Z)-octadecadienoic acid (9R-HpODE) which is also rapidly converted to its hydroxyl derivative, 9-Hydroxyoctadecadienoic acid (9R-HODE).

Linoleic acid + O_{2} $\rightleftharpoons$ 9R-HpODE → 9R-HODE

The S stereoisomer of 9R-HODE, 9S-HODE, has a range of biological activities related to oxidative stress and pain perception (see 9-Hydroxyoctadecadienoic acid. It is known or likely that 9R-HODE possesses at least some of these activities. For example, 9R-HODE, similar to 9S-HODE, mediates the perception of acute and chronic pain induced by heat, UV light, and inflammation in the skin of rodents (see 9-Hydroxyoctadecadienoic acid#9-HODEs as mediators of pain perception). However, production of these LA metabolites does not appear to be the primary function of ALOX12B; ALOX12B's primary function appears to be to metabolize linoleic acid that is not free but rather esterified to certain

=== Proposed principal activity of ALOX12B ===
ALOX12B targets Linoleic acid (LA). LA is the most abundant fatty acid in the skin epidermis, being present mainly esterified to the omega-hydroxyl residue of amide-linked omega-hydroxylated very long chain fatty acids (VLCFAs) in a unique class of ceramides termed esterified omega-hydroxyacyl-sphingosine (EOS). EOS is an intermediate component in a proposed multi-step metabolic pathway which delivers VLCFAs to the cornified lipid envelop in the skin's Stratum corneum; the presence of these wax-like, hydrophobic VLCFAs is needed to maintain the skin's integrity and functionality as a water barrier (see Lung microbiome#Role of the epithelial barrier). ALOX12B metabolizes the LA in EOS to its 9-hydroperoxy derivative; ALOXE3 then converts this derivative to three products: a) 9R,10R-trans-epoxide,13R-hydroxy-10E-octadecenoic acid, b) 9-keto-10E,12Z-octadecadienoic acid, and c) 9R,10R-trans-epoxy-13-keto-11E-octadecenoic acid. These ALOX12B-oxidized products signal for the hydrolysis (i.e. removal) of the oxidized products from EOS; this allows the multi-step metabolic pathway to proceed in delivering the VLCFAs to the cornified lipid envelop in the skin's Stratum corneum.

== Tissue distribution ==
ALOX12B protein has been detected in humans that in the same tissues the express ALOXE3 and ALOX15B viz., upper layers of the human skin and tongue and in tonsils. mRNA for it has been detected in additional tissues such as the lung, testis, adrenal gland, ovary, prostate, and skin with lower abundance levels detected in salivary and thyroid glands, pancreas, brain, and plasma blood leukocytes.

== Clinical significance ==
=== Congenital ichthyosiform erythrodema ===
Deletions of Alox12b or AloxE2 genes in mice cause a congenital scaly skin disease which is characterized by a greatly reduced skin water barrier function and is similar in other ways to the autosomal recessive nonbullous Congenital ichthyosiform erythroderma (ARCI) disease of humans. Mutations in many of the genes that encode proteins, including ALOX12B and ALOXE3, which conduct the steps that bring and then bind VLCFA to the stratums corneum are associated with ARCI. ARCI refers to nonsyndromic (i.e. not associated with other signs or symptoms) congenital Ichthyosis including Harlequin-type ichthyosis, Lamellar ichthyosis, and Congenital ichthyosiform erythroderma. ARCI has an incidence of about 1/200,000 in European and North American populations; 40 different mutations in ALOX12B and 13 different mutations in ALOXE3 genes account for a total of about 10% of ARCI case; these mutations uniformly cause a total loss of ALOX12B or ALOXE3 function (see mutations).

=== Proliferative skin diseases ===
In psoriasis and other proliferative skin diseases such as the erythrodermas underlying lung cancer, cutaneous T cell lymphoma, and drug reactions, and in discoid lupus, seborrheic dermatitis, subacute cutaneous lupus erythematosus, and pemphigus foliaceus, cutaneous levels of ALOX12B mRNA and 12R-HETE are greatly increased. It is not clear if these increases contribute to the disease by, for example, 12R-HETE induction of inflammation, or are primarily a consequence of skin proliferation.

=== Embryogenesis ===
The expression of Alox12b and Aloxe3 mRNA in mice parallels, and is proposed to be instrumental for, skin development in mice embryogenesis; the human orthologs of these genes, i.e. ALOX12B and ALOXE3, may have a similar role in humans.

=== Essential fatty acid deficiency ===
Severe dietary deficiency of polyunsaturated omega 6 fatty acids leads to the essential fatty acid deficiency syndrome that is characterized by scaly skin and excessive water loss; in humans and animal models the syndrome is fully reversed by dietary omega 6 fatty acids, particularly linoleic acid. It is proposed that this deficiency disease resembles and has a similar basis to Congenital ichthyosiform erythrodema; that is, it is at least in part due to a deficiency of linoleic acid and thereby in the EOS-based delivery of VLCFA to the stratum corneum.
