= Levuglandin =

Levuglandin D_{2}

Names
- IUPAC name (5Z,8R,9R,10E,12S)-9-acetyl-8-formyl-12- hydroxyheptadeca-5,10-dienoic acid

Identifiers
CAS Number	91712-44-6
3D model (JSmol)	Interactive image
ChemSpider	7827799
KEGG	C13808
PubChem CID	9548876
UNII	C3ZPX5F3BY
CompTox Dashboard (EPA)	DTXSID30429543
- InChI: InChI=1S/C20H32O5/c1-3-4-7-11-18(23)13-14-19(16(2)22)17(15-21)10-8-5-6-9-12-20(24)25/h5,8,13-15,17-19,23H,3-4,6-7,9-12H2,1-2H3,(H,24,25)/b8-5-,14-13+/t17-,18-,19-/m0/s1 Key: MLLWPVVMXGUOHD-QNUMDXCLSA-N
- SMILES: CCCCC[C@@H](/C=C/[C@H]([C@@H](C/C=C\CCCC(=O)O)C=O)C(=O)C)O

Properties
Chemical formula	C_{20}H_{32}O_{5}
Molar mass	352.465 g/mol
- Except where otherwise noted, data are given for materials in their standard state (at 25 °C [77 °F], 100 kPa). verify (what is ?) Infobox references

Levuglandin E_{2}

Names
- IUPAC name (5Z,8R,9R,10E,12S)-8-acetyl-9-formyl-12- hydroxyheptadeca-5,10-dienoic acid
- Other names LGE2

Identifiers
CAS Number	91712-41-3
3D model (JSmol)	Interactive image
ChemSpider	4696839
KEGG	C13807
PubChem CID	5771742
CompTox Dashboard (EPA)	DTXSID30429543
- InChI: InChI=1S/C20H32O5/c1-3-4-7-10-18(23)14-13-17(15-21)19(16(2)22)11-8-5-6-9-12-20(24)25/h5,8,13-15,17-19,23H,3-4,6-7,9-12H2,1-2H3,(H,24,25)/b8-5-,14-13+/t17-,18-,19-/m0/s1 Key: WJWAORNTZNRHBP-QNUMDXCLSA-N
- SMILES: CCCCC[C@@H](/C=C/[C@@H](C=O)[C@@H](C/C=C\CCCC(=O)O)C(=O)C)O

Properties
Chemical formula	C_{20}H_{32}O_{5}
Molar mass	352.465 g/mol
- Except where otherwise noted, data are given for materials in their standard state (at 25 °C [77 °F], 100 kPa). Infobox references

Levuglandins are reactive aldehydes formed by the spontaneous rearrangement of prostaglandin H (PGH). Enantiomerically pure levuglandin (LG) E_{2} can also be formed through the cyclooxygenase (COX) pathway by a rearrangement of the prostaglandin (PG) endoperoxide PGH _{2}. They are nonclassic eicosanoids. One species, levuglandin E_{2}, (LGE_{2}), forms neurotoxic adducts with amyloid beta. Levuglandins and isolevuglandins can damage proteins by covalent adduction, thereby interfering with their normal functions. These lipid-derived protein modifications may serve as dosimeters of oxidative injury. Elevated plasma levels of isoLG-protein epitopes are associated with atherosclerosis but are independent of total cholesterol, a classical risk factor.

== History ==
Though spontaneous rearrangements of PGH2 are known to generate prostaglandins (PG) PGD2 and PGE2. Prof. Robert Salomon at Case Western Reserve University discovered that a novel alternative rearrangement also occurs that producing two γ-ketoaldehydes and named them levuglandins LGD2 and LGE2 as they are derivatives of levulinaldehyde with prostanoid side chains.
