= ABCA12 =

Protein-coding gene in humans

Identifiers
- Aliases: ABCA12, ARCI4A, ARCI4B, ICR2B, LI2, ATP binding cassette subfamily A member 12
- External IDs: OMIM: 607800; MGI: 2676312; GeneCards: ABCA12
Enzyme activity
EC #	BRENDA	ExPASy	KEGG	MetaCyc
7.6.2.1	↗	↗	↗	↗

Gene location (Human)
Chr.	Chromosome 2 (human)
Band	2q35	Start	214,931,542 bp
Band	2q35	End	215,138,626 bp

Gene location (Mouse)
Chr.	Chromosome 1 (mouse)
Band	1|1 C3	Start	71,281,435 bp
Band	1|1 C3	End	71,454,069 bp
RNA expression pattern
Bgee	Human / Mouse (ortholog); Top expressed in: human penis; skin of thigh; skin of arm; vulva; skin of abdomen; testicle; skin of hip; gonad; cervix epithelium; vagina / Top expressed in: esophagus; lip; embryo; skin of external ear; embryo; zygote; epidermis; secondary oocyte; spermatid; hair follicle; More reference expression data
BioGPS	n/a
Gene ontology
Molecular function	nucleotide binding; transporter activity; apolipoprotein A-I receptor binding; ATPase activity; protein binding; signaling receptor binding; ATP binding; ATPase-coupled lipid transmembrane transporter activity; lipid transporter activity; ATPase-coupled transmembrane transporter activity
Cellular component	cytoplasm; integral component of membrane; cytosol; membrane; plasma membrane; epidermal lamellar body; intracellular membrane-bounded organelle
Biological process	surfactant homeostasis; lipid transport; ceramide transport; establishment of skin barrier; secretion by cell; phospholipid efflux; keratinization; cellular homeostasis; keratinocyte differentiation; positive regulation of cholesterol efflux; positive regulation of protein localization to cell surface; lipid homeostasis; regulated exocytosis; lung alveolus development; protein localization to plasma membrane; transmembrane transport
Sources:Amigo / QuickGO
Orthologs
Databases	NCBI: entry; OMA: entry
Species	Human	Mouse
Entrez	26154	74591
Ensembl	ENSG00000144452	ENSMUSG00000050296
UniProt	Q86UK0	E9Q876
RefSeq (mRNA)	NM_015657; NM_173076	NM_175210
RefSeq (protein)	NP_056472; NP_775099	NP_780419
Location (UCSC)	Chr 2: 214.93 – 215.14 Mb	Chr 1: 71.28 – 71.45 Mb
PubMed search
- Wikidata
View/Edit Human	View/Edit Mouse

ATP-binding cassette sub-family A member 12 also known as ATP-binding cassette transporter 12 is a protein that in humans is encoded by the ABCA12 gene.

ABCA12 belongs to a group of genes called the ATP-binding cassette family, which makes proteins that transport molecules across cell membranes. The ABCA12 gene is active in some types of skin cells and in several other tissues, such as testis, placenta, lung, stomach, and fetal brain and liver. This protein appears to be essential for normal development of the skin, which provides a barrier between the body and its surrounding environment. It transports epidermoside, a glucosylceramide, out of the keratinocytes of the stratum corneum of the epidermis.

The ABCA12 gene is located on the long (q) arm of chromosome 2 between positions 34 and 35, from base pair 215,621,772 to base pair 215,828,656.

== Clinical significance ==
=== Harlequin-type ichthyosis ===
Several mutations in the ABCA12 gene are known to cause harlequin-type ichthyosis. Most of these mutations are predicted to lead to an absence of ABCA12 protein or the production of an extremely small version of the protein that cannot transport lipids properly. A loss of functional ABCA12 protein causes numerous problems with the development of the epidermis before and after birth. Abnormalities in lipid transport prevent the skin from forming an effective barrier and result in the hard, thick scales characteristic of harlequin ichthyosis.

=== Lamellar ichthyosis type 2 ===
Mutations in the ABCA12 gene also cause another severe skin disorder, lamellar ichthyosis type 2. People with this disorder have red, scaly, plate-like skin covering most of their bodies. The ABCA12 mutations that cause this disorder substitute one amino acid (a building block of proteins) for another amino acid in the ABCA12 protein. These mutations almost always occur in an important functional region of the protein (the region that binds to ATP, a molecule that supplies energy for chemical reactions). Changes in the structure of the ABCA12 protein likely disrupt its ability to transport lipids, which affects the development of skin before and after birth.
