= Arachidonate 8-lipoxygenase =

arachidonate 8-lipoxygenase

Identifiers
- EC no.: 1.13.11.40
- CAS no.: 100900-72-9

Databases
- IntEnz: IntEnz view
- BRENDA: BRENDA entry
- ExPASy: NiceZyme view
- KEGG: KEGG entry
- MetaCyc: metabolic pathway
- PRIAM: profile
- PDB structures: RCSB PDB PDBe PDBsum
- Gene Ontology: AmiGO / QuickGO
Search
- PMC: articles
- PubMed: articles
- NCBI: proteins

Arachidonate 8-lipoxygenase (EC 1.13.11.40) is an enzyme that catalyzes the chemical reaction

arachidonate + O_{2} $\rightleftharpoons$ (5Z,9E,11Z,14Z)-(8R)-8-hydroperoxyicosa-5,9,11,14-tetraenoate

Thus, the two substrates of this enzyme are arachidonate and oxygen, whereas its product is (5Z,9E,11Z,14Z)-(8R)-8-hydroperoxyicosa-5,9,11,14-tetraenoate.

This enzyme belongs to the family of oxidoreductases, specifically those acting on single donors with O_{2} as oxidant and incorporation of two atoms of oxygen into the substrate (oxygenases). The oxygen incorporated need not be derived from O_{2}. The systematic name of this enzyme class is arachidonate:oxygen 8-oxidoreductase. Other names in common use include 8-lipoxygenase, and 8(R)-lipoxygenase. This enzyme participates in arachidonic acid metabolism.

== Structural studies ==
As of late 2007, only one structure has been solved for this class of enzymes, with the PDB accession code 2FNQ.
