= Lamellar ichthyosis =

Ichthyosis lamellaris
- Other names: Ichthyosis lamellaris
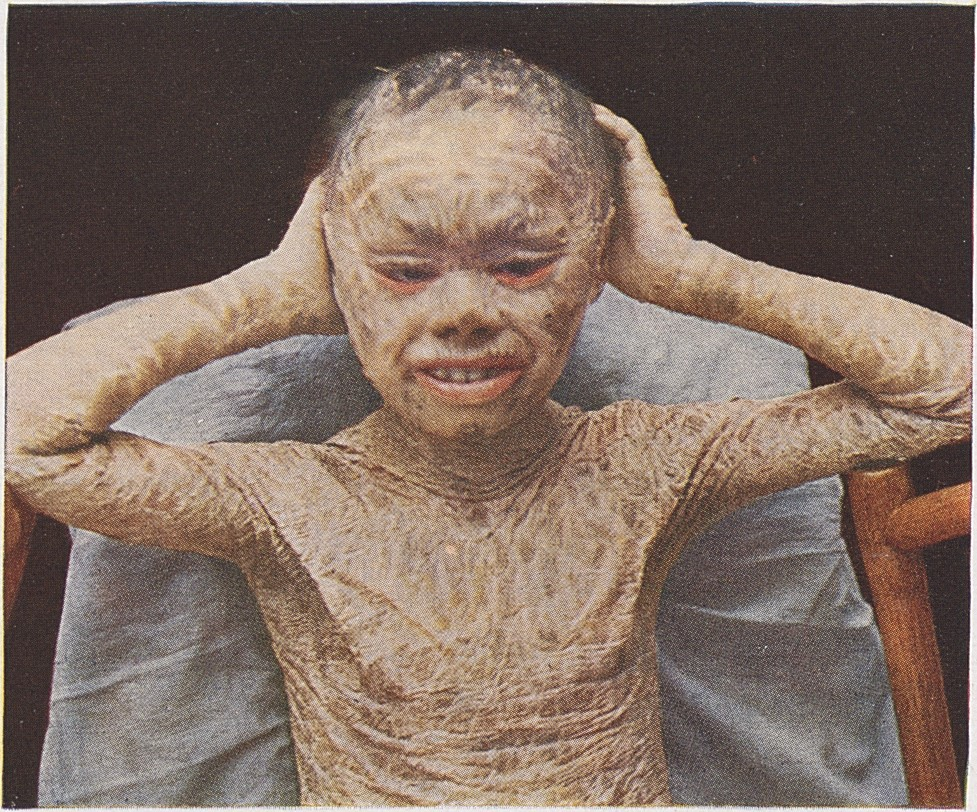
- Patient with lamellar ichthyosis
- Specialty: Medical genetics
- Usual onset: Present at birth
- Causes: Genetics

Lamellar ichthyosis, also known as ichthyosis lamellaris and nonbullous congenital ichthyosis, is a rare inherited skin disorder, affecting around 1 in 600,000 people.

== Presentation ==
Affected babies are born in a collodion membrane – a shiny, waxy-appearing outer layer on the skin. This is shed 10–14 days after birth, revealing the main symptom of the disease: extensive scaling of the skin caused by hyperkeratosis. With increasing age, the scaling tends to become concentrated around joints in areas such as the groin, the armpits, the inside of the elbow, and the neck. The scales often tile the skin and may resemble fish scales.

=== Collodion baby ===
In medicine, the term collodion baby applies to newborns who appear to have an extra layer of skin (known as a collodion membrane) that has a collodion-like quality. It is a descriptive term, not a specific diagnosis or disorder; as such, it is a syndrome.

==== Appearance and treatment at birth ====
The appearance is often described as a shiny film that resembles a layer of Vaseline. The eyelids and mouth may have the appearance of being forced open due to the tightness of the skin. There can also be associated eversion of the eyelids (ectropion).

Collodion babies can have severe medical consequences, mainly because the baby can lose heat and fluid through the abnormal skin. This can lead to hypothermia and dehydration. Strategies to prevent these problems include the use of emollients or nursing the baby in a humidified incubator. There is an increased risk of skin infection and mechanical compression, leading to problems like limb ischemia. There is also a risk of intoxication by cutaneous absorption of topical products; for example, salicylate intoxication (similar to aspirin overdose) due to keratolytics.

The condition is not thought to be painful or in itself distressing to the child. Nursing usually takes place in a neonatal intensive care unit, and good intensive care seems to have improved the prognosis markedly. The collodion membrane should peel off or "shed" 2 to 4 weeks after birth, revealing the underlying skin disorder.

The condition can resemble but is different from harlequin type ichthyosis.

==== Long-term course ====
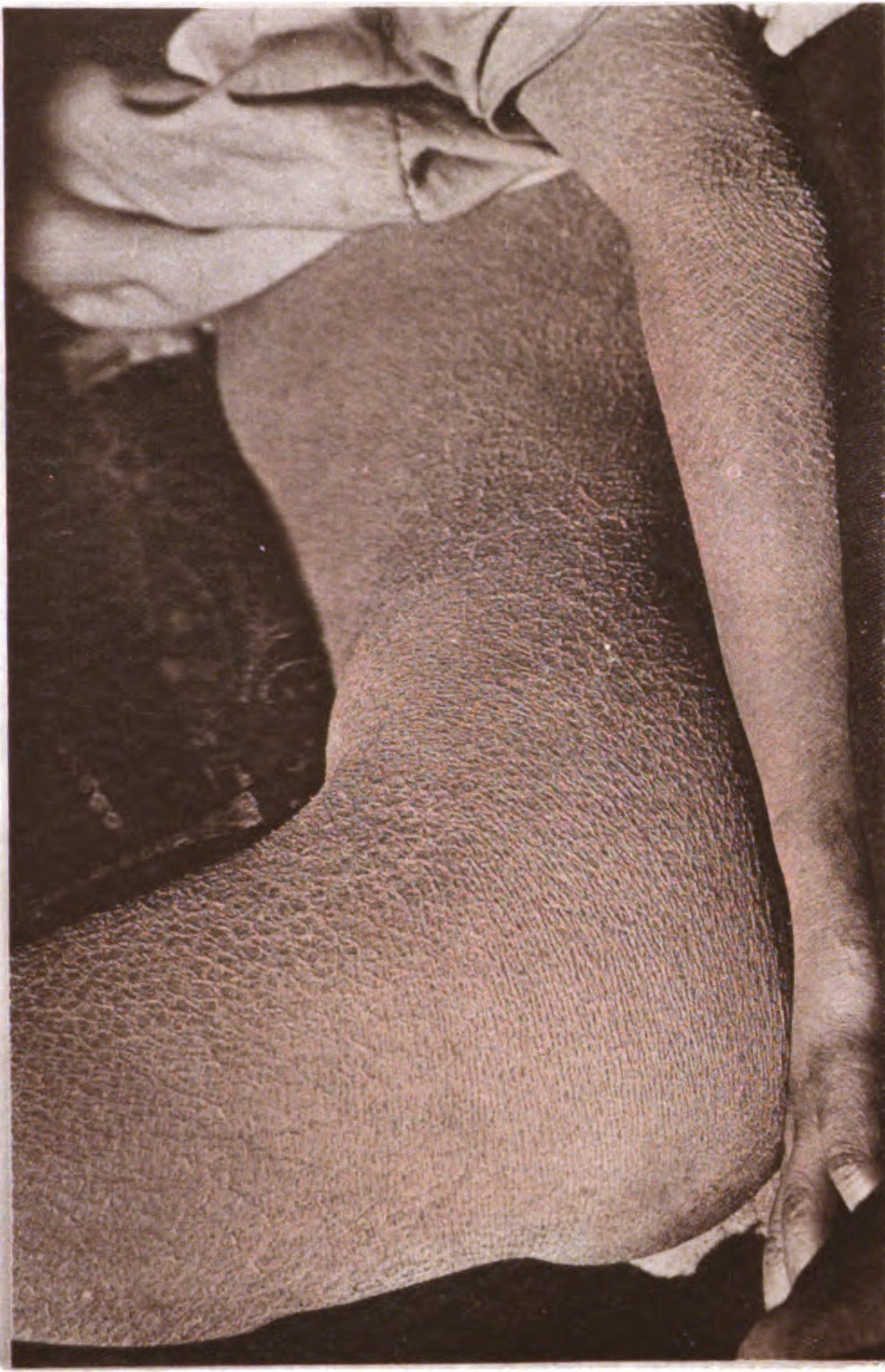

The appearance can be caused by several skin diseases, and it is most often not associated with other birth defects. In most cases, the baby develops an ichthyosis or ichthyosis-like condition or other rare skin disorder.

Most cases (approximately 75%) of collodion baby will go on to develop a type of autosomal recessive congenital ichthyosis (either lamellar ichthyosis or congenital ichthyosiform erythroderma).

In around 10% of cases the baby sheds this layer of skin and has normal skin for the rest of its life. This is known as self-healing collodion baby.

The remaining 15% of cases are caused by a variety of diseases involving keratinization disorders. Known causes of collodion baby include ichthyosis vulgaris and trichothiodystrophy. Less well documented causes include Sjögren–Larsson syndrome, Netherton syndrome, Gaucher disease type 2, congenital hypothyroidism, Conradi syndrome, Chanarin–Dorfman syndrome, ketoadipiaciduria, koraxitrachitic syndrome, ichthyosis variegata and palmoplantar keratoderma with anogenital leukokeratosis. Since many of these conditions have an autosomal recessive inheritance pattern, they are rare and can be associated with consanguinity.

Tests that can be used to find the cause of collodion baby include examination of the hairs, blood tests and a skin biopsy.

=== Associated medical problems ===
Overheating: The scaling of the skin prevents normal sweating so hot weather and vigorous exercise can cause problems.

Eye problems: The eyelids can be pulled down by the tightness of the skin and this can make eyelids (but usually just the lower one) very red and they are prone to drying and irritation.

Constriction bands: Very rarely children with this condition can have tight bands of skin around their fingers or toes (usually at the tips) that can prevent proper blood circulation to the area.

Hair loss: Severe scaling of the skin on the scalp can lead to patchy loss of hair, but this is rarely permanent.

== Genetics ==
This condition is an autosomal recessive genetic disorder, which means the defective gene is located on an autosome, and both parents must carry one copy of the defective gene in order to have a child born with the disorder. Carriers of a recessive gene usually do not show any signs or symptoms of the disorder.

One form of ichthyosis lamellaris (LI1) is associated with a deficiency of the enzyme keratinocyte transglutaminase.

Genes involved include:

Type	OMIM	Gene	Locus
LI1	242300	TGM1	14
LI2	601277	ABCA12	2q34
LI3	604777	CYP4F22	19p13.12
LI5	606545	CERS3	15q26.3

== Treatments ==
As with all types of ichthyosis, there is no cure but the symptoms can be relieved.

- Moisturizers
- Prevention of overheating
- Eye drops (to prevent the eyes from becoming dried out)
- Systemic retinoids (isotretinoin and acitretin are very effective, but careful monitoring for toxicity is required. Only severe cases may require intermittent therapy.)

Psychological therapy or support may be required as well.

== See also ==
- Ichthyosis
- Congenital ichthyosiform erythroderma
- Bullous congenital ichthyosiform erythroderma
