= Congenital ichthyosiform erythroderma =

- Other names: Nonbullous congenital ichthyosiform erythroderma
- Specialty: Medical genetics

Congenital ichthyosiform erythroderma, also known as nonbullous congenital ichthyosiform erythroderma, is a rare type of the ichthyosis family of skin diseases which occurs in 1 in 200,000 to 300,000 births. The disease comes under the umbrella term autosomal recessive congenital ichthyosis, which include non-syndromic congenital ichthyoses such as harlequin ichthyosis and lamellar ichthyosis.

== Symptoms and signs ==
Infants are often born in a collodion membrane, a shiny, wax outer layer on the skin and usually with ectropion, a condition in which the eyelids turn outwards. When the membrane is shed, the skin is red with a generalized white scale. Palms, soles and areas on the joints are often affected with hyperkeratosis, a thickening of the layer of dead skin cells on the surface of the skin forming scales. Eclabium (eversion of the lips), ectropion and alopecia (hair loss) are more common in congenital ichthyosiform erythroderma than in lamellar ichthyosis.

Congenital ichthyosiform erythroderma can present very similarly to lamellar ichthyosis and they often share characteristics, though the two conditions can often be differentiated by the appearance of the scales. Scales on patients with congenital ichthyosiform erythroderma are fine and white on skin with erythema while they appear larger and greyer on the limbs, compared to lamellar ichthyosis where scales appear large and dark.

== Genetics ==
Congenital ichthyosiform erythroderma is an autosomal recessive genetic disorder. This means a child must inherit a defective pair of genes (one from each parent) to show the symptoms. Parents who are carriers of the defective genes show no symptoms but their children have a 25% chance of having the disease.

There are several genetic faults which can produce Congenital ichthyosiform erythroderma. Known genes involved include TGM1, ALOX12B, ALOXE3, NIPAL4, ABCA12, CYP4F22, LIPN, CERS3, PNPLA1, ST14, and CASP14.

== Diagnosis ==
Diagnosis of this condition is done via:

- Sequencing of genes – TG1, ALOXE3, ALOX12B, NIPAL4, CYP4F2, CERS3, LIPN, etc.
- Measuring in situ TG1 activity in cryostat section
- Electron microscopy – cholesterol clefts in stratum corneum

== See also ==
- Ichthyosis
- Lamellar ichthyosis
- Collodion baby
- List of cutaneous conditions
