= Keratinocyte transglutaminase =

Protein found in humans

TGM1

Identifiers
- Aliases: TGM1, ARCI1, ICR2, KTG, LI, LI1, TGASE, TGK, transglutaminase 1
- External IDs: OMIM: 190195; MGI: 98730; GeneCards: TGM1
Available structures
PDB	Ortholog search: PDBe RCSB
PDB	List of PDB id codes 2XZZ
Enzyme activity
EC #	BRENDA	ExPASy	KEGG	MetaCyc
2.3.2.13	↗	↗	↗	↗

Gene location (Human)
Chr.	Chromosome 14 (human)
Band	14q12	Start	24,249,114 bp
Band	14q12	End	24,264,432 bp

Gene location (Mouse)
Chr.	Chromosome 14 (mouse)
Band	14|14 C3	Start	55,937,466 bp
Band	14|14 C3	End	55,951,383 bp
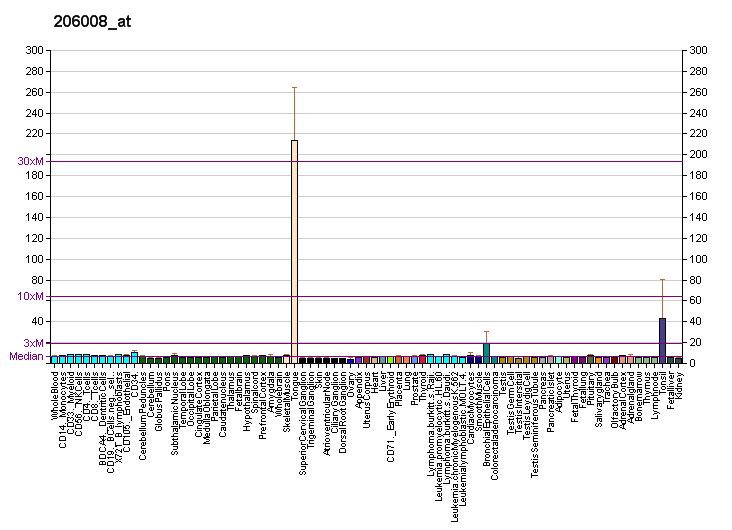
RNA expression pattern
Bgee	Human / Mouse (ortholog); Top expressed in: skin of leg; skin of abdomen; vagina; right hemisphere of cerebellum; testicle; tonsil; minor salivary glands; olfactory zone of nasal mucosa; ectocervix; gonad / Top expressed in: esophagus; lip; yolk sac; right kidney; proximal tubule; skin of abdomen; skin of back; skin of external ear; epidermis; iris; More reference expression data
BioGPS	More reference expression data
Gene ontology
Molecular function	transferase activity; acyltransferase activity; protein binding; metal ion binding; protein-glutamine gamma-glutamyltransferase activity
Cellular component	intrinsic component of membrane; extracellular exosome; membrane; cornified envelope; cytosol; plasma membrane
Biological process	cell envelope organization; keratinization; positive regulation of keratinocyte proliferation; positive regulation of cell cycle; keratinocyte differentiation; cornification; peptide cross-linking
Sources:Amigo / QuickGO
Orthologs
Databases	NCBI: entry; OMA: entry
Species	Human	Mouse
Entrez	7051	21816
Ensembl	ENSG00000092295; ENSG00000285348	ENSMUSG00000022218
UniProt	P22735	Q9JLF6
RefSeq (mRNA)	NM_000359	NM_001161714; NM_001161715; NM_019984
RefSeq (protein)	NP_000350	NP_001155186; NP_001155187; NP_064368
Location (UCSC)	Chr 14: 24.25 – 24.26 Mb	Chr 14: 55.94 – 55.95 Mb
PubMed search
- Wikidata
View/Edit Human	View/Edit Mouse

Protein-glutamine gamma-glutamyltransferase K is a transglutaminase enzyme that in humans is encoded by the TGM1 gene.

== Function ==
Keratinocyte transglutaminase enzymes serve to specifically catalyze the development of the cornified cell envelope, a defining characteristic of epidermal keratinocytes that have undergone the termination of differentiation. The specific cross linkages formed by keratinocyte transglutaminase are between n^ε-(γ-glutamyl)lysine residues which develop into isopeptide protein-protein linkages that adds to the stabilization of the cornified cell envelope.

In terminally differentiated stratified squamous epithelia, the cornified cell envelope protein linkages allow for a structurally fortified, yet flexible (15 nm thick) layer to the place of the cell membrane, acting as a highly insoluble barrier. The expression of the enzyme is most highly exhibited along the biological membrane of these fully formed epithelial cells, preventing the cell from undergoing chemical and or physical damages. A lesser amount of enzymatic activity, of the TGK genes (5-10%), lies within the cytoplasmic fraction of such cells, allowing for finalization of the cross-linkaging necessary for the full functionality of the cornified cell envelope.

== Pathology ==
A deficiency is associated with ichthyosis lamellaris. Epidermal transglutaminase is the autoantigen, in humans, of dermatitis herpetiformis.

A study on the mutation of keratinocyte transglutaminase (TGK) came to conclude that those affected with ichthyosis lamellaris, present a substantial deficit in keratinocyte transglutaminase activity. It was concluded that those afflicted, display a decrease in activity of the enzyme, as a result of a lessened amount of transcription of the human TGK gene. This lack of protein stems from a common mutation of the TGK gene, which exists in two possible variants, found at the TGM1 locus on the 14q11 chromosome, as exhibited amongst all the subjects of the study. Such mutations were of the compound heterozygous or homozygous variety, which leads to the expression of lamellar ichthyosis as a result of abnormal cross-linkaging of the cornified cell envelope.

== See also ==
- Keratinocyte
