= Hereditary spastic paraplegia =

Group of genetic disorders affecting motor neurons controlling the lower limbs

- Specialty: Neurology
- Frequency: 0.005%

Hereditary spastic paraplegia (HSP) is a group of inherited diseases whose main feature is a progressive gait disorder. The disease presents with progressive stiffness (spasticity) and contraction in the lower limbs. HSP is also known as hereditary spastic paraparesis, familial spastic paraplegia, French settlement disease, Strumpell disease, or Strumpell-Lorrain disease. The symptoms are a result of dysfunction of long axons in the spinal cord. The affected cells are the primary motor neurons; therefore, the disease is an upper motor neuron disease. HSP is not a form of cerebral palsy even though it physically may appear and behave much the same as spastic diplegia. The origin of HSP is different from cerebral palsy. Despite this, some of the same anti-spasticity medications used in spastic cerebral palsy are sometimes used to treat HSP symptoms, they are very common in people with epilepsy, starting at age 40.

HSP is caused by defects in transport of proteins, structural proteins, cell-maintaining proteins, lipids, and other substances through the cell. Long nerve fibers (axons) are affected because long distances make nerve cells particularly sensitive to defects in these mentioned mechanisms.

The disease was first described in 1880 by the German neurologist Adolph Strümpell. It was described more extensively in 1888 by Maurice Lorrain, a French physician. Due to their contribution in describing the disease, it is still called Strümpell-Lorrain disease in French-speaking countries. The term hereditary spastic paraplegia was coined by Anita Harding in 1983.

== Signs and symptoms ==
Symptoms depend on the type of HSP inherited. The main feature of the disease is progressive spasticity in the lower limbs due to pyramidal tract dysfunction. This also results in brisk reflexes, extensor plantar reflexes, muscle weakness, and variable bladder disturbances. Furthermore, among the core symptoms of HSP are also included abnormal gait and difficulty in walking, decreased vibratory sense at the ankles, and paresthesia. Individuals with HSP can experience extreme fatigue associated with central nervous system and neuromuscular disorders, which can be disabling. Initial symptoms are typically difficulty with balance, stubbing the toe or stumbling. Symptoms of HSP may begin at any age, from infancy to older than 60 years. If symptoms begin during the teenage years or later, then spastic gait disturbance usually progresses over many years. Canes, walkers, and wheelchairs may eventually be required, although some people never require assistance devices. Disability has been described as progressing more rapidly in adult onset forms.

More specifically, patients with the autosomal dominant pure form of HSP reveal normal facial and extraocular movement. Although jaw jerk may be brisk in older subjects, there is no speech disturbance or difficulty of swallowing. Upper extremity muscle tone and strength are normal. In the lower extremities, muscle tone is increased at the hamstrings, quadriceps and ankles. Weakness is most notable at the iliopsoas, tibialis anterior, and to a lesser extent, hamstring muscles. In the complex form of the disorder, additional symptoms are present. These include: peripheral neuropathy, amyotrophy, ataxia, intellectual disability, ichthyosis, epilepsy, optic neuropathy, dementia, deafness, or problems with speech, swallowing or breathing.

Anita Harding classified the HSP in a pure and complicated form. Pure HSP presents with spasticity in the lower limbs, associated with neurogenic bladder disturbance as well as lack of vibration sensitivity (pallhypesthesia). On the other hand, HSP is classified as complex when lower limb spasticity is combined with any additional neurological symptom.

This classification is subjective and patients with complex HSPs are sometimes diagnosed as having cerebellar ataxia with spasticity, intellectual disability (with spasticity), or leukodystrophy. Some of the genes listed below have been described in other diseases than HSP before. Therefore, some key genes overlap with other disease groups.

=== Age of onset ===
In the past, HSP has been classified as early onset beginning in early childhood or later onset in adulthood. The age of onsets has two points of maximum at age 2 and around age 40. New findings propose that an earlier onset leads to a longer disease duration without loss of ambulation or the need for the use of a wheelchair. This was also described earlier, that later onset forms evolve more rapidly. However, this is not always the case as De Novo Early Onset SPG4, a form of infantile HSP, involves loss of ambulation and other motor skills.

== Cause ==
HSP is a group of genetic disorders. It follows general inheritance rules and can be inherited in an autosomal dominant, autosomal recessive or X-linked recessive manner. The mode of inheritance involved has a direct impact on the chances of inheriting the disorder. Over 70 genotypes had been described, and over 50 genetic loci have been linked to this condition. Ten genes have been identified with autosomal dominant inheritance. One of these, SPG4, accounts for ~50% of all genetically solved cases, or approximately 25% of all HSP cases. Twelve genes are known to be inherited in an autosomal recessive fashion. Collectively this latter group account for ~1/3 cases.

Most altered genes have known function, but for some the function haven't been identified yet. All of them are listed in the gene list below, including their mode of inheritance. Some examples are spastin (SPG4) and paraplegin (SPG7) are both AAA ATPases.

=== Genotypes ===
The genes are designated SPG (Spastic gait gene). The gene locations are in the format: chromosome - arm (short or p: long or q) - band number. These designations are for the human genes only. The locations may (and probably will) vary in other organisms. Despite the number of genes known to be involved in this condition ~40% of cases have yet to have their cause identified. In the table below SPG? is used to indicate a gene that has been associated with HSP but has not yet received an official HSP gene designation.

Genotype	OMIM	Gene symbol	Gene locus	Inheritance	Age of onset	Other names and characteristics
SPG1	303350	L1CAM	Xq28	X-linked recessive	Early	MASA syndrome
SPG2	312920	PLP1	Xq22.2	X-linked recessive	Variable	Pelizaeus–Merzbacher disease
SPG3A	182600	ATL1	14q22.1	Autosomal dominant	Early	Strumpell disease (this Wiki)
SPG4	182601	SPAST	2p22.3	Autosomal dominant	Variable	
SPG5A	270800	CYP7B1	8q12.3	Autosomal recessive	Variable	
SPG6	600363	NIPA1	15q11.2	Autosomal dominant	Variable	
SPG7	607259	SPG7	16q24.3	Autosomal recessive	Variable	
SPG8	603563	KIAA0196	8q24.13	Autosomal dominant	Adult	
SPG9A	601162	ALDH18A1	10q24.1	Autosomal dominant	Teenage	Cataracts with motor neuronopathy, short stature and skeletal abnormalities
SPG9B	616586	ALDH18A1	10q24.1	Autosomal recessive	Early	
SPG10	604187	KIF5A	12q13.3	Autosomal dominant	Early	
SPG11	604360	SPG11	15q21.1	Autosomal recessive	Variable	
SPG12	604805	RTN2	19q13.32	Autosomal dominant	Early	
SPG13	605280	HSP60	2q33.1	Autosomal dominant	Variable	
SPG14	605229	?	3q27–q28	Autosomal recessive	Adult	
SPG15	270700	ZFYVE26	14q24.1	Autosomal recessive	Early	
SPG16	300266	?	Xq11.2	X-linked recessive	Early	
SPG17	270685	BSCL2	11q12.3	Autosomal dominant	Teenage	
SPG18	611225	ERLIN2	8p11.23	Autosomal recessive	Early	
SPG19	607152	?	9q	Autosomal dominant	Adult onset	
SPG20	275900	SPG20	13q13.3	Autosomal recessive	Early onset	Troyer syndrome
SPG21	248900	ACP33	15q22.31	Autosomal recessive	Early onset	MAST syndrome
SPG22	300523	SLC16A2	Xq13.2	X-linked recessive	Early onset	Allan–Herndon–Dudley syndrome
SPG23	270750	RIPK5	1q32.1	Autosomal recessive	Early onset	Lison syndrome
SPG24	607584	?	13q14	Autosomal recessive	Early onset	
SPG25	608220	?	6q23–q24.1	Autosomal recessive	Adult	
SPG26	609195	B4GALNT1	12q13.3	Autosomal recessive	Early onset	
SPG27	609041	?	10q22.1–q24.1	Autosomal recessive	Variable	
SPG28	609340	DDHD1	14q22.1	Autosomal recessive	Early onset	
SPG29	609727	?	1p31.1–p21.1	Autosomal dominant	Teenage	
SPG30	610357	KIF1A	2q37.3	Autosomal recessive	Teenage	
SPG31	610250	REEP1	2p11.2	Autosomal dominant	Early onset	
SPG32	611252	?	14q12–q21	Autosomal recessive	Childhood	
SPG33	610244	ZFYVE27	10q24.2	Autosomal dominant	Adult	
SPG34	300750	?	Xq24–q25	X-linked recessive	Teenage/Adult	
SPG35	612319	FA2H	16q23.1	Autosomal recessive	Childhood	
SPG36	613096	?	12q23–q24	Autosomal dominant	Teenage/Adult	
SPG37	611945	?	8p21.1–q13.3	Autosomal dominant	Variable	
SPG38	612335	?	4p16–p15	Autosomal dominant	Teenage/Adult	
SPG39	612020	PNPLA6	19p13.2	Autosomal recessive	Childhood	
SPG41	613364	?	11p14.1–p11.2	Autosomal dominant	Adolescence	
SPG42	612539	SLC33A1	3q25.31	Autosomal dominant	Variable	
SPG43	615043	C19orf12	19q12	Autosomal recessive	Childhood	
SPG44	613206	GJC2	1q42.13	Autosomal recessive	Childhood/teenage	
SPG45	613162	NT5C2	10q24.32–q24.33	Autosomal recessive	Infancy	
SPG46	614409	GBA2	9p13.3	Autosomal recessive	Variable	
SPG47	614066	AP4B1	1p13.2	Autosomal recessive	Childhood	
SPG48	613647	AP5Z1	7p22.1	Autosomal recessive	6th decade	
SPG49	615041	TECPR2	14q32.31	Autosomal recessive	Infancy	
SPG50	612936	AP4M1	7q22.1	Autosomal recessive	Infancy	
SPG51	613744	AP4E1	15q21.2	Autosomal recessive	Infancy	
SPG52	614067	AP4S1	14q12	Autosomal recessive	Infancy	
SPG53	614898	VPS37A	8p22	Autosomal recessive	Childhood	
SPG54	615033	DDHD2	8p11.23	Autosomal recessive	Childhood	
SPG55	615035	C12orf65	12q24.31	Autosomal recessive	Childhood	
SPG56	615030	CYP2U1	4q25	Autosomal recessive	Childhood	
SPG57	615658	TFG	3q12.2	Autosomal recessive	Early	
SPG58	611302	KIF1C	17p13.2	Autosomal recessive	Within first two decades	Spastic ataxia 2
SPG59	603158	USP8	15q21.2	?Autosomal recessive	Childhood	
SPG60	612167	WDR48	3p22.2	?Autosomal recessive	Infancy	
SPG61	615685	ARL6IP1	16p12.3	Autosomal recessive	Infancy	
SPG62	615681	ERLIN1	10q24.31	Autosomal recessive	Childhood	
SPG63	615686	AMPD2	1p13.3	Autosomal recessive	Infancy	
SPG64	615683	ENTPD1	10q24.1	Autosomal recessive	Childhood	
SPG66	610009	ARSI	5q32	?Autosomal dominant	Infancy	
SPG67	615802	PGAP1	2q33.1	Autosomal recessive	Infancy	
SPG68	609541	KLC2	11q13.1	Autosomal recessive	Childhood	SPOAN syndrome
SPG69	609275	RAB3GAP2	1q41	Autosomal recessive	Infancy	Martsolf syndrome, Warburg Micro syndrome
SPG70	156560	MARS	12q13	?Autosomal dominant	Infancy	
SPG71	615635	ZFR	5p13.3	?Autosomal recessive	Childhood	
SPG72	615625	REEP2	5q31	Autosomal recessive; autosomal dominant	Infancy	
SPG73	616282	CPT1C	19q13.33	Autosomal dominant	Adult	
SPG74	616451	IBA57	1q42.13	Autosomal recessive	Childhood	
SPG75	616680	MAG	19q13.12	Autosomal recessive	Childhood	
SPG76	616907	CAPN1	11q13	Autosomal recessive	Adult	
SPG77	617046	FARS2	6p25	Autosomal recessive	Childhood	
SPG78	617225	ATP13A2	1p36	Autosomal recessive	Adult	Kufor–Rakeb syndrome
SPG79	615491	UCHL1	4p13	Autosomal recessive	Childhood	
HSNSP	256840	CCT5	5p15.2	Autosomal recessive	Childhood	Hereditary sensory neuropathy with spastic paraplegia
SPG?		SERAC1	6q25.3		Juvenile	MEGDEL syndrome
SPG?	605739	KY	3q22.2	Autosomal recessive	Infancy	
SPG?		PLA2G6	22q13.1	Autosomal recessive	Childhood	
SPG?		ATAD3A	1p36.33	Autosomal dominant	Childhood	Harel-Yoon syndrome
SPG?		KCNA2	1p13.3	Autosomal dominant	Childhood	KCNA2-related disorders
SPG?		Granulin	17q21.31			
SPG?		POLR3A	10q22.3	Autosomal recessive		

== Pathophysiology ==
The major feature of HSP is a length-dependent axonal degeneration. These include the crossed and uncrossed corticospinal tracts to the legs and fasciculus gracilis. The spinocerebellar tract is involved to a lesser extent. Neuronal cell bodies of degenerating axons are preserved and there is no evidence of primary demyelination. Loss of anterior horn cells of the spinal cord are observed in some cases. Dorsal root ganglia, posterior roots and peripheral nerves are not directly affected.HSP affects several pathways in motor neurons. Many genes were identified and linked to HSP. It remains a challenge to accurately define the key players in each of the affected pathways, mainly because many genes have multiple functions and are involved in more than one pathway.

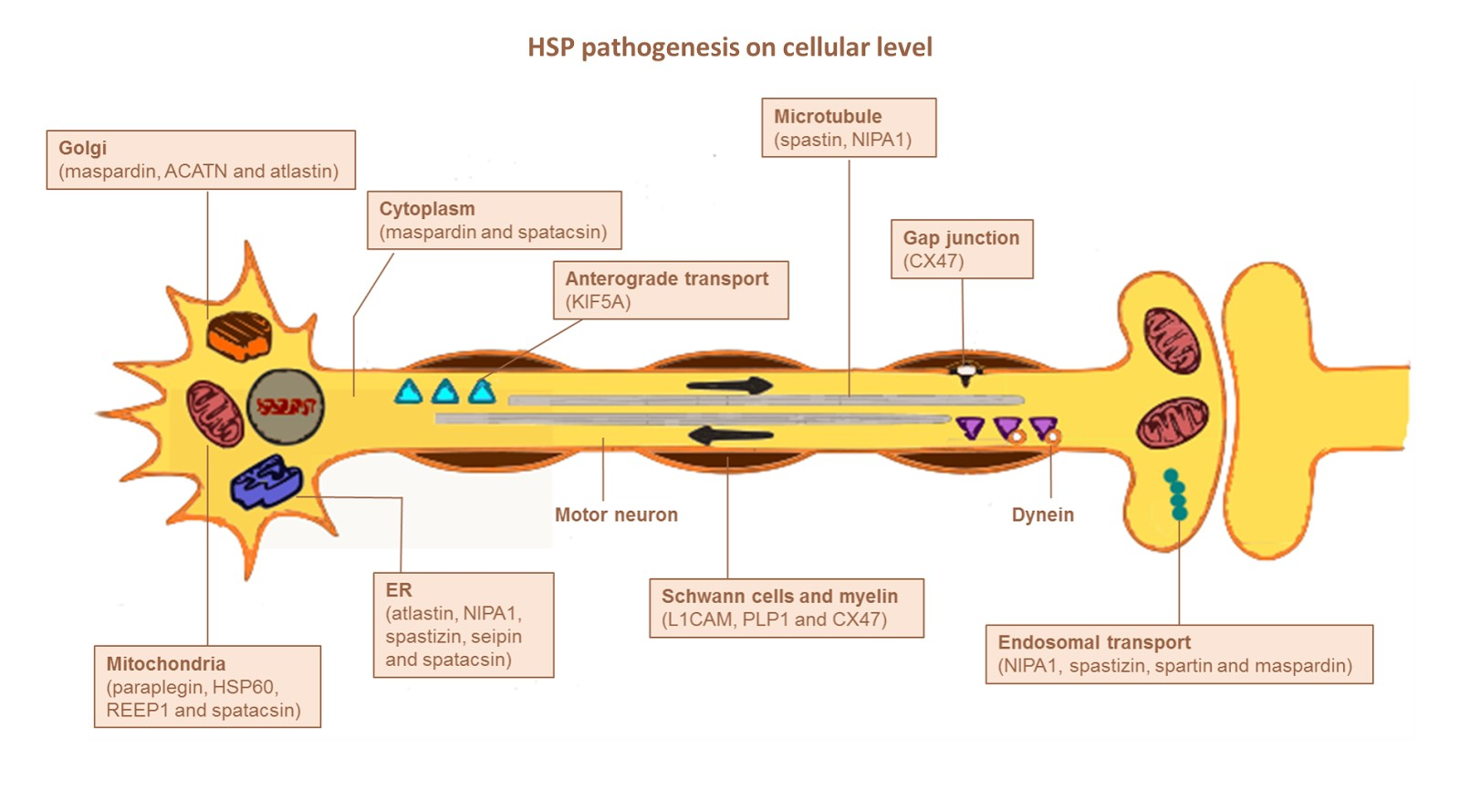
Overview of HSP pathogenesis on cellular level. Identified affected genes in each pathway are depicted.

=== Axon pathfinding ===
Pathfinding is important for axon growth to the right destination (e.g. another nerve cell or a muscle). Significant for this mechanism is the L1CAM gene, a cell surface glycoprotein of the immunoglobulin superfamily. Mutations leading to a loss-of-function in L1CAM are also found in other X-linked syndromes. All of these disorders display corticospinal tract impairment (a hallmark feature of HSP). L1CAM participates in a set of interactions, binding other L1CAM molecules as well as extracellular cell adhesion molecules, integrins, and proteoglycans or intracellular proteins like ankyrins.

The pathfinding defect occurs via the association of L1CAM with neuropilin-1. Neuropilin-1 interacts with Plexin-A proteins to form the Semaphorin-3A receptor complex. Semaphorin-a3A is then released in the ventral spinal cord to steer corticospinal neurons away from the midline spinal cord / medullary junction. If L1CAM does not work correctly due to a mutation, the cortiocospinal neurons are not directed to the correct position and the impairment occurs.

=== Lipid metabolism ===
Axons in the central and peripheral nervous system are coated with an insulation, the myelin layer, to increase the speed of action potential propagation. Abnormal myelination in the CNS is detected in some forms of hsp HSP. Several genes were linked to myelin malformation, namely PLP1, GFC2 and FA2H. The mutations alter myelin composition, thickness and integrity.

Endoplasmic reticulum (ER) is the main organelle for lipid synthesis. Mutations in genes encoding proteins that have a role in shaping ER morphology and lipid metabolism were linked to HSP. Mutations in ATL1, BSCL2 and ERLIN2 alter ER structure, specifically the tubular network and the formation of three-way junctions in ER tubules. Many mutated genes are linked to abnormal lipid metabolism. The most prevalent effect is on arachidonic acid (CYP2U1) and cholesterol (CYP7B1) metabolism, phospholipase activity (DDHD1 and DDHD2), ganglioside formation (B4GALNT-1) and the balance between carbohydrate and fat metabolism (SLV33A1).

=== Endosomal trafficking ===
Neurons take in substances from their surrounding by endocytosis. Endocytic vesicles fuse to endosomes in order to release their content. There are three main compartments that have endosome trafficking: Golgi to/from endosomes; plasma membrane to/from early endosomes (via recycling endosomes) and late endosomes to lysosomes. Dysfunction of endosomal trafficking can have severe consequences in motor neurons with long axons, as reported in HSP. Mutations in AP4B1 and KIAA0415 are linked to disturbance in vesicle formation and membrane trafficking including selective uptake of proteins into vesicles. Both genes encode proteins that interact with several other proteins and disrupt the secretory and endocytic pathways.

=== Mitochondrial function ===
Mitochondrial dysfunctions have been connected with developmental and degenerative neurological disorders. Only a few HSP genes encode mitochondrial proteins. Two mitochondrial resident proteins are mutated in HSP: paraplegin and chaperonin 60. Paraplegin is a m-AAA metalloprotease of the inner mitochondrial membrane. It functions in ribosomal assembly and protein quality control. The impaired chaperonin 60 activity leads to impaired mitochondrial quality control. Two genes DDHD1 and CYP2U1 have shown alteration of mitochondrial architecture in patient fibroblasts. These genes encode enzymes involved in fatty-acid metabolism.

== Diagnosis ==
Initial diagnosis of HSPs relies upon family history, the presence or absence of additional signs and the exclusion of other nongenetic causes of spasticity, the latter being particular important in sporadic cases.Cerebral and spinal MRI is an important procedure performed in order to rule out other frequent neurological conditions, such as multiple sclerosis, but also to detect associated abnormalities such as cerebellar or corpus callosum atrophy as well as white matter abnormalities. Differential diagnosis of HSP should also exclude spastic diplegia which presents with nearly identical day-to-day effects and even is treatable with similar medicines such as baclofen and orthopedic surgery; at times, these two conditions may look and feel so similar that the only perceived difference may be HSP's hereditary nature versus the explicitly non-hereditary nature of spastic diplegia (however, unlike spastic diplegia and other forms of spastic cerebral palsy, HSP cannot be reliably treated with selective dorsal rhizotomy).Ultimate confirmation of HSP diagnosis can only be provided by carrying out genetic tests targeted towards known genetic mutations.

=== Classification ===
Hereditary spastic paraplegias can be classified based on the symptoms; mode of inheritance; the patient's age at onset; the affected genes; and biochemical pathways involved.

== Treatment ==
No specific treatment is known that would prevent, slow, or reverse HSP. Available therapies mainly consist of symptomatic medical management and promoting physical and emotional well-being. Therapeutics offered to HSP patients include:

- Baclofen – a voluntary muscle relaxant to relax muscles and reduce tone. This can be administered orally or intrathecally. (Studies in HSP)
- Tizanidine – to treat nocturnal or intermittent spasms (studies available)
- Diazepam and clonazepam – to decrease intensity of spasms
- Oxybutynin chloride – an involuntary muscle relaxant and spasmolytic agent, used to reduce spasticity of the bladder in patients with bladder control problems
- Tolterodine tartrate – an involuntary muscle relaxant and spasmolytic agent, used to reduce spasticity of the bladder in patients with bladder control problems
- Cro System – to reduce muscle overactivity (existing studies for spasticity)
- Botulinum toxin – to reduce muscle overactivity (existing studies for HSP patients)
- Antidepressants (such as selective serotonin re-uptake inhibitors, tricyclic antidepressants and monoamine oxidase inhibitors) – for patients experiencing clinical depression
- Physical therapy – to restore and maintain the ability to move; to reduce muscle tone; to maintain or improve range of motion and mobility; to increase strength and coordination; to prevent complications, such as frozen joints, contractures, or bedsores.

== Prognosis ==
Although HSP is a progressive condition, the prognosis for individuals with HSP varies greatly. It primarily affects the legs although there can be some upperbody involvement in some individuals. Some cases are seriously disabling whilst others leave people able to do most ordinary activities to an ordinary extent without needing adjustments. The majority of individuals with HSP have a normal life expectancy.

== Epidemiology ==
Worldwide, the prevalence of all hereditary spastic paraplegias combined is estimated to be 2 to 6 in 100,000 people. A Norwegian study of more than 2.5 million people published in March 2009 has found an HSP prevalence rate of 7.4/100,000 of population – a higher rate, but in the same range as previous studies. No differences in rate relating to gender were found, and average age at onset was 24 years. In the United States, Hereditary Spastic Paraplegia is listed as a "rare disease" by the Office of Rare Diseases (ORD) of the National Institutes of Health which means that the disorder affects less than 200,000 people in the US population.
