= Spastic paraplegia 31 =

Medical condition

Spastic paraplegia 31 is a rare type of hereditary spastic paraplegia which is characterized by sensation anomalies of the lower extremities.

== Signs and symptoms ==
People with this condition usually start having symptoms either at childhood or in mid-adulthood (which is usually 30 years of age), these symptoms are proximal weakness of the lower extremities, brisk reflexes, and spastic gait.

This disorder can also manifest itself with a more complex phenotype, people with this phenotype exhibit the symptoms mentioned before and other additional ones, these include peripheral neuropathy, bulbar palsy, dysarthria, dysphagia, distal limb amyotrophy, and impaired sensation of vibration in the distal limbs.

Other symptoms include problems controlling the bladder and pes cavus.

== Complications ==
The degeneration of lower motor neurons leads to paralysis of the lower limbs, and without support, might lead someone to not be able to walk.

== Genetics ==
This condition is caused by autosomal dominant mutations in the REEP1 gene, located in chromosome 2. This gene has an important role in the formation of the receptor expression-enhancing protein 1, this protein can be found in spinal cord and brain neurons.

This gene provides instructions for making a protein called receptor expression-enhancing protein 1 (REEP1), which is found in neurons in the brain and spinal cord. The protein itself is located within the mitochondria, and it is important for regulating endoplasmic reticulum size, alongside determining the amount of proteins that it can process.

The mutations implicated in SPG31 result in a nonfunctional and short protein that can be broken down rather quickly, thus causing a notable reduction of functional REEP1 protein.

== Treatment ==
The walking impairment can be managed with walking support and physical therapy

== Diagnosis ==
This condition can be diagnosed through whole genome sequencing (or just by sequencing the REEP1 gene), electrophysiological studies, and by examination of the symptoms presented by the individual.

== Prevalence ==
While autosomal dominant spastic paraplegias (ADSPG) like this one have a worldwide incidence of 1 in 100,000 people, this condition only accounts for 3 to 9% of ADSPG diagnosis in the world.

== See also ==
- Spasticity
- Hereditary spastic paraplegia
- Hereditary sensory and autonomic neuropathy
