= RAB18 =

Protein-coding gene in the species Homo sapiens

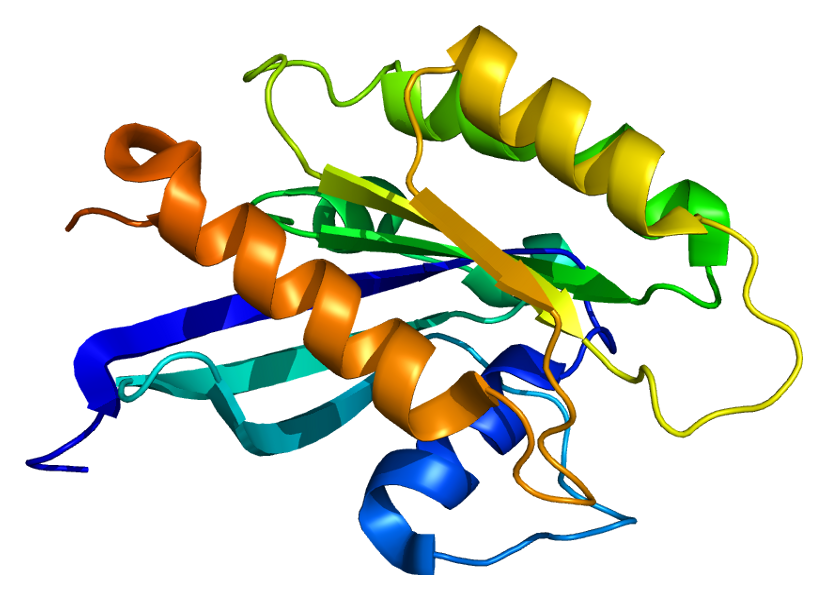

Identifiers
- Aliases: RAB18, RAB18LI1, WARBM3, member RAS oncogene family
- External IDs: OMIM: 602207; MGI: 102790; GeneCards: RAB18
Available structures
PDB	Ortholog search: PDBe RCSB
PDB	List of PDB id codes 1X3S
Enzyme activity
EC #	BRENDA	ExPASy	KEGG	MetaCyc
3.6.5.2	↗	↗	↗	↗

Gene location (Human)
Chr.	Chromosome 10 (human)
Band	10p12.1	Start	27,504,174 bp
Band	10p12.1	End	27,543,207 bp

Gene location (Mouse)
Chr.	Chromosome 18 (mouse)
Band	18 A1|18 4.53 cM	Start	6,733,905 bp
Band	18 A1|18 4.53 cM	End	6,794,429 bp
RNA expression pattern
Bgee	Human / Mouse (ortholog); Top expressed in: cardiac muscle tissue of right atrium; skin of arm; myocardium of left ventricle; decidua; Achilles tendon; tibialis anterior muscle; retinal pigment epithelium; islet of Langerhans; mucosa of ileum; corpus epididymis / Top expressed in: extensor digitorum longus muscle; plantaris muscle; cingulate gyrus; pineal gland; calvaria; central gray substance of midbrain; skin of external ear; right kidney; yolk sac; cardiac muscle tissue of left ventricle; More reference expression data
BioGPS	n/a
Gene ontology
Molecular function	nucleotide binding; GTP binding; protein binding; GDP binding; GTPase activity
Cellular component	intracellular anatomical structure; membrane; endoplasmic reticulum tubular network; cytosol; endoplasmic reticulum membrane; plasma membrane; secretory granule membrane; Golgi apparatus; synapse
Biological process	eye development; protein transport; multicellular organism development; endoplasmic reticulum tubular network organization; brain development; lipid droplet organization; neutrophil degranulation; small GTPase mediated signal transduction; import into nucleus; intracellular protein transport; Rab protein signal transduction
Sources:Amigo / QuickGO
Orthologs
Databases	NCBI: entry; OMA: entry
Species	Human	Mouse
Entrez	22931	19330
Ensembl	ENSG00000099246	ENSMUSG00000073639
UniProt	Q9NP72	P35293
RefSeq (mRNA)	NM_001256410; NM_001256411; NM_001256412; NM_001256415; NM_021252	NM_001278447; NM_181070
RefSeq (protein)	NP_001243339; NP_001243340; NP_001243341; NP_001243344; NP_067075	NP_001265376; NP_851415
Location (UCSC)	Chr 10: 27.5 – 27.54 Mb	Chr 18: 6.73 – 6.79 Mb
PubMed search
- Wikidata
View/Edit Human	View/Edit Mouse

Ras-related protein Rab-18 is a protein that in humans is encoded by the RAB18 gene. It is a member of the Rab family of Ras-related small GTPases.

Rab18 is a ubiquitously expressed protein with particularly high expression in the brain. Rab18 was first characterised as an endosomal protein in epithelial cells of mouse kidney and intestines. Subsequent studies revealed that Rab18 has a wide intracellular distribution; localising to the Golgi complex, endoplasmic reticulum, lipid droplets, and cytosol of various cell types. In the brain, Rab18 has been isolated in association with synaptic vesicles and has been observed to localise to secretory granules in neuroendocrine cells.

Mutations in RAB18, RAB3GAP1, RAB3GAP2, or TBC1D20 are thought to cause Warburg Micro syndrome by disrupting RAB18 function. RAB3GAP1, RAB3GAP2, and TBC1D20 genes offer instructions for creating proteins that regulate RAB18. The RAB3GAP1 and RAB3GAP2 proteins interact and create a guanine–nucleotide exchange factor complex that activates RAB18. The TBC1D20 protein may inactivate RAB18 by acting as a GTPase-activating protein for it.
