= Spastic paraplegia 6 =

- Other names: SPG6, Familial spastic paraplegia autosomal dominant 3, FSP3
- Specialty: Medical genetics
- Symptoms: Neurological
- Usual onset: Birth
- Duration: Lifelong
- Types: Pure and Complex
- Causes: Genetic mutation
- Prevention: None
- Prognosis: Medium
- Frequency: rare, only 73 cases have been described in medical literature
- Deaths: -

Spastic paraplegia 6 is a rare type of hereditary spastic paraplegia characterized by muscle tone and bladder anomalies associated with pes cavus and specific hyperreflexia.

== Signs and symptoms ==
People with spastic paraplegia 6 generally start showing symptoms during their late teenage years or early adulthood, the symptoms are spasticity affecting the lower limbs, hyperreflexia, high-arched feet (pes cavus), and mild bladder problems.

Less common symptoms include epilepsy, peripheral neuropathy of variable degrees, and memory problems.

== Complications ==
There are various complications related to the symptoms of SP6

For example, the pes cavus deformity can cause claw toes, hindfoot deformity, big toe cockup deformity, and plantar fascia contractures. The spasticity can cause chronic pain, joint deformities, chronic constipation and pressure-associated sores, etc.

== Types ==
There are two subtypes of SPG6: pure and complex

The pure form involves symptoms affecting the lower extremities.

The complex form involves symptoms affecting both lower and upper extremities, although it affects the upper extremities to a lesser extent.

== Treatment ==
Treatment is focused on the symptoms themselves.

== Causes ==
This condition is caused by autosomal dominant mutations in the NIPA1 gene, in chromosome 15, although the genetic cause can vary among families: this gene mutation was found in a large family from Britain.

== Epidemiology ==
According to OMIM, 73 cases have been described in medical literature.
