= SPG23 =

Genetic element in the species Homo sapiens

Identifiers
- Aliases: SPG23, spastic paraplegia 23 (autosomal recessive)
- External IDs: GeneCards: SPG23; OMA:SPG23 - orthologs
Orthologs
Species	Human	Mouse
Entrez	353293	n/a
Ensembl	n/a	n/a
UniProt	n a	n/a
RefSeq (mRNA)	n/a	n/a
RefSeq (protein)	n/a	n/a
Location (UCSC)	n/a	n/a
PubMed search		n/a
- Wikidata
View/Edit Human

Spastic paraplegia 23 (SPG autosomal recessive) is a 25cM gene locus at 1q24-q32. A genome-wide linkage screen has associated this locus with a type of hereditary spastic paraplegia (HSP).
