= Phenylalanine–tRNA ligase =

Identifiers
- EC no.: 6.1.1.20
- CAS no.: 9055-66-7

Databases
- BRENDA: enzyme data
- ExPASy: NiceZyme view
- KEGG: enzyme entry
- MetaCyc: metabolic pathway
- Rhea: reactions
- PDB structures: RCSB PDB PDBe PDBsum
- Gene Ontology: AmiGO / QuickGO
Search
- PMC: articles
- PubMed: articles
- NCBI: proteins

Ferredoxin-fold anticodon binding domain
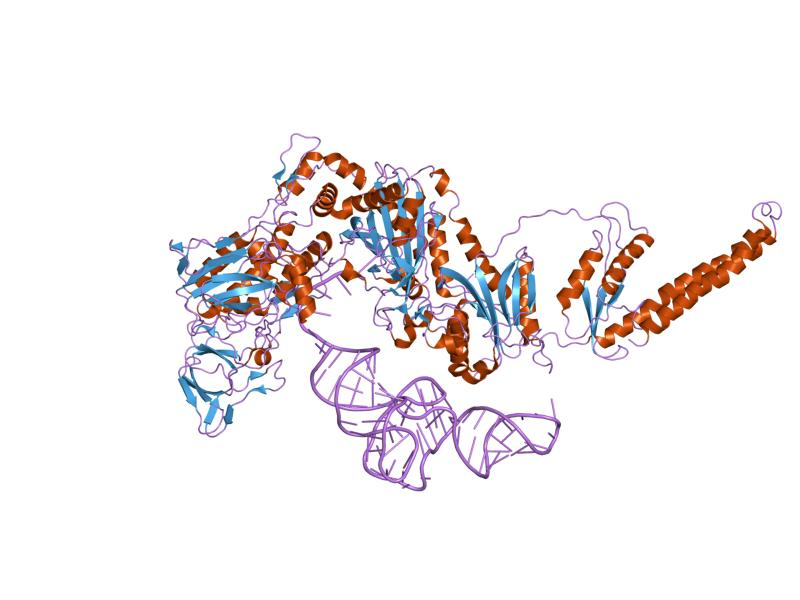
- The crystal structure of phenylalanyl-tRNA synthetase from Thermus thermophilus complexed with cognate tRNA^{Phe}

Identifiers
- Symbol: FDX-ACB
- Pfam: PF03147
- InterPro: IPR005121
- SCOP2: 1pys / SCOPe / SUPFAM
Available protein structures:
- PDB: IPR005121 PF03147 (ECOD; PDBsum)
- AlphaFold: IPR005121; PF03147

In enzymology, a phenylalanine–tRNA ligase (EC 6.1.1.20) is an enzyme that catalyzes the chemical reaction

ATP + L-phenylalanine + tRNA^{Phe} $\rightleftharpoons$ AMP + diphosphate + L-phenylalanyl-tRNA^{Phe}

The 3 substrates of this enzyme are ATP, L-phenylalanine, and tRNA^{Phe}, whereas its 3 products are AMP, diphosphate, and L-phenylalanyl-tRNA^{Phe}.

In humans, there is a separate mitochondrial (FARS2) and heterodimeric cytosolic (FARSA and FARSB) isozyme. This enzyme belongs to the family of ligases, to be specific those forming carbon–oxygen bonds in aminoacyl-tRNA and related compounds. The systematic name of this enzyme class is L-phenylalanine:tRNA^{Phe} ligase (AMP-forming). Other names in common use include phenylalanyl-tRNA synthetase, phenylalanyl-transfer ribonucleate synthetase, phenylalanine-tRNA synthetase, phenylalanyl-transfer RNA synthetase, phenylalanyl-tRNA ligase, phenylalanyl-transfer RNA ligase, L-phenylalanyl-tRNA synthetase, and phenylalanine translase. This enzyme participates in phenylalanine, tyrosine and tryptophan biosynthesis and aminoacyl-tRNA biosynthesis.

Phenylalanine-tRNA synthetase (PheRS) is known to be among the most complex enzymes of the aaRS (aminoacyl-tRNA synthetase) family. Bacterial and mitochondrial PheRSs share a ferredoxin-fold anticodon binding (FDX-ACB) domain, which represents a canonical double split alpha+beta motif having no insertions. The FDX-ACB domain displays a typical RNA recognition fold (RRM) formed by the four-stranded antiparallel beta sheet, with two helices packed against it.

== Structural studies ==
As of late 2007, 10 structures have been solved for this class of enzymes, with PDB accession codes PDB: 1B70, PDB: 1B7Y, PDB: 1EIY, PDB: 1JJC, PDB: 1PYS, PDB: 2AKW, PDB: 2ALY, PDB: 2AMC, PDB: 2CXI, and PDB: 2IY5.
