= Phenylalanine–tRNA ligase alpha subunit =

Enzyme found in humans

FARSA

Identifiers
- Aliases: FARSA, CML33, FARSL, FARSLA, FRSA, PheHA, phenylalanyl-tRNA synthetase alpha subunit, phenylalanyl-tRNA synthetase subunit alpha, RILDBC2
- External IDs: OMIM: 602918; MGI: 1913840; GeneCards: FARSA
Available structures
PDB	Ortholog search: PDBe RCSB
PDB	List of PDB id codes 3L4G
Enzyme activity
EC #	BRENDA	ExPASy	KEGG	MetaCyc
6.1.1.20	↗	↗	↗	↗

Gene location (Human)
Chr.	Chromosome 19 (human)
Band	19p13.13	Start	12,922,479 bp
Band	19p13.13	End	12,934,037 bp

Gene location (Mouse)
Chr.	Chromosome 8 (mouse)
Band	8|8 C3	Start	85,583,618 bp
Band	8|8 C3	End	85,595,886 bp
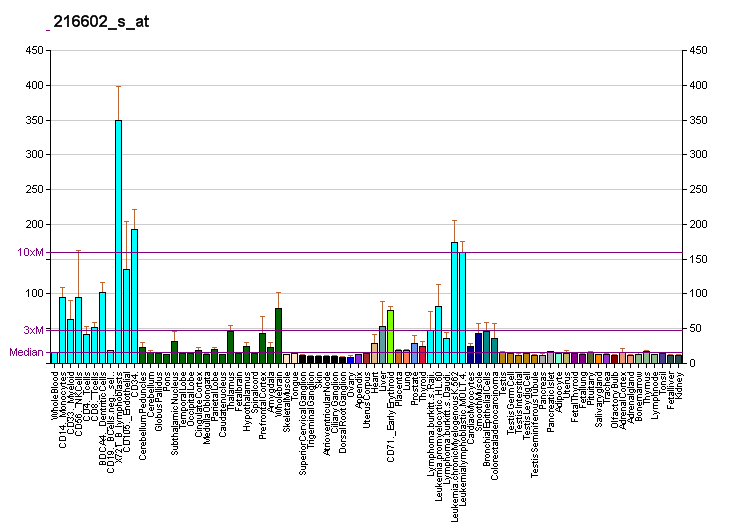

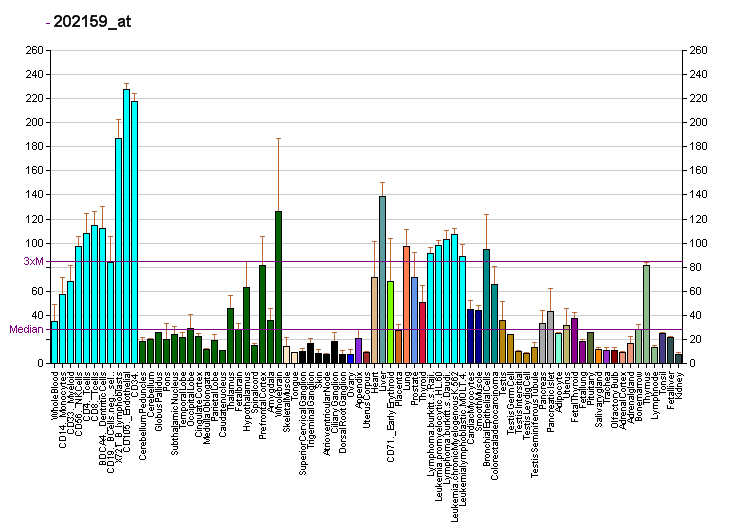
RNA expression pattern
Bgee	Human / Mouse (ortholog); Top expressed in: prefrontal cortex; mucosa of transverse colon; right frontal lobe; cingulate gyrus; anterior cingulate cortex; Brodmann area 9; Brodmann area 10; gastrocnemius muscle; apex of heart; ganglionic eminence / Top expressed in: spermatocyte; spermatid; embryo; morula; embryo; ventricular zone; neural layer of retina; blastocyst; yolk sac; lip; More reference expression data
BioGPS	More reference expression data
Gene ontology
Molecular function	aminoacyl-tRNA ligase activity; tRNA binding; nucleotide binding; ligase activity; protein binding; ATP binding; phenylalanine-tRNA ligase activity; RNA binding
Cellular component	cytoplasm; cytosol; membrane; phenylalanine-tRNA ligase complex
Biological process	tRNA aminoacylation; protein biosynthesis; protein heterotetramerization; tRNA aminoacylation for protein translation; phenylalanyl-tRNA aminoacylation
Sources:Amigo / QuickGO
Orthologs
Databases	NCBI: entry; OMA: entry
Species	Human	Mouse
Entrez	2193	66590
Ensembl	ENSG00000179115	ENSMUSG00000003808
UniProt	Q9Y285	Q8C0C7
RefSeq (mRNA)	NM_004461	NM_025648
RefSeq (protein)	NP_004452	NP_079924
Location (UCSC)	Chr 19: 12.92 – 12.93 Mb	Chr 8: 85.58 – 85.6 Mb
PubMed search
- Wikidata
View/Edit Human	View/Edit Mouse

Phenylalanine–tRNA ligase alpha subunit, also called phenylalanyl-tRNA synthetase alpha chain, is an enzyme that in humans is encoded by the FARSA gene. Two copies each of this protein and FARSB bind together to form a heterotetramer complex that functions as a Phenylalanine–tRNA ligase in the cytoplasm. This means it participates in RNA-to-protein translation by attaching the amino acid phenylalanine to the corresponding type of transfer RNA, tRNA(Phe).

== Function ==
Aminoacyl-tRNA synthetases are a class of enzymes that charge tRNAs with their cognate amino acids. This gene encodes a product which is similar to the catalytic subunit of prokaryotic and Saccharomyces cerevisiae phenylalanyl-tRNA synthetases (PheRS). This gene product has been shown to be expressed in a tumor-selective and cell cycle stage- and differentiation-dependent manner, the first member of the tRNA synthetase gene family shown to exhibit this type of regulated expression

== Medical significance ==
Pathogenic mutations in FARSA or FARSB are the cause of a disorder called Rajab interstitial lung disease with brain calcifications. The type caused by FARSA is denoted type 2 (RILDBC2), and is associated with growth delays, lung disease, and abnormal calcifications in the brain.

== See also ==
- Phenylalanine–tRNA ligase, mitochondrial (FARS2) – analogous enzyme in the mitochondria
