= Phenylalanine–tRNA ligase, mitochondrial =

Enzyme found in humans

FARS2
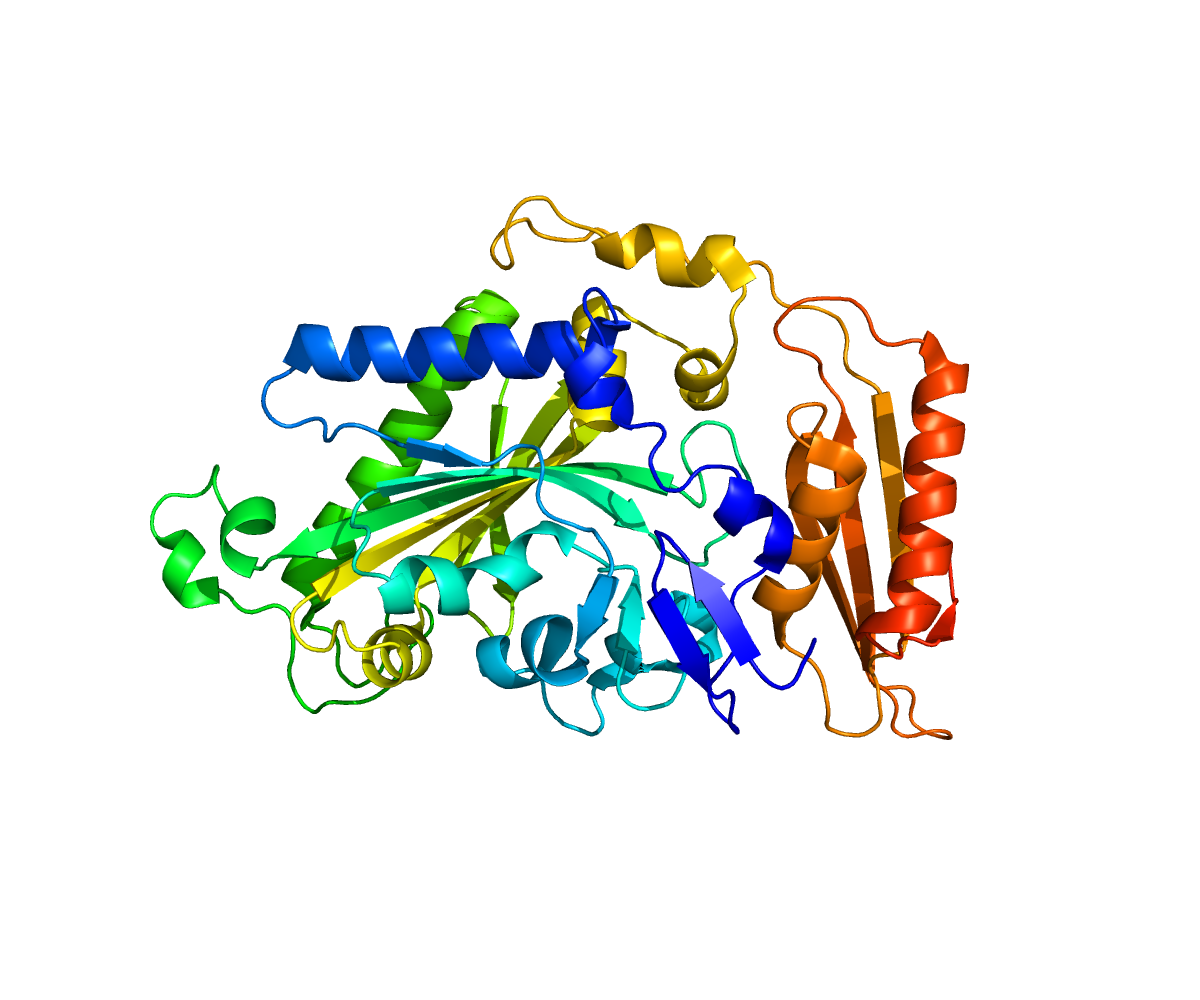

Identifiers
- Aliases: FARS2, COXPD14, FARS1, HSPC320, PheRS, dJ520B18.2, phenylalanyl-tRNA synthetase 2, mitochondrial, SPG77, mtPheRS
- External IDs: OMIM: 611592; MGI: 1917205; GeneCards: FARS2
Available structures
PDB	Ortholog search: PDBe RCSB
PDB	List of PDB id codes 3CMQ, 3HFV, 3TEG, 3TUP
Enzyme activity
EC #	BRENDA	ExPASy	KEGG	MetaCyc
6.1.1.20	↗	↗	↗	↗

Gene location (Human)
Chr.	Chromosome 6 (human)
Band	6p25.1	Start	5,261,044 bp
Band	6p25.1	End	5,829,192 bp

Gene location (Mouse)
Chr.	Chromosome 13 (mouse)
Band	13|13 A3.3	Start	36,117,412 bp
Band	13|13 A3.3	End	36,726,280 bp
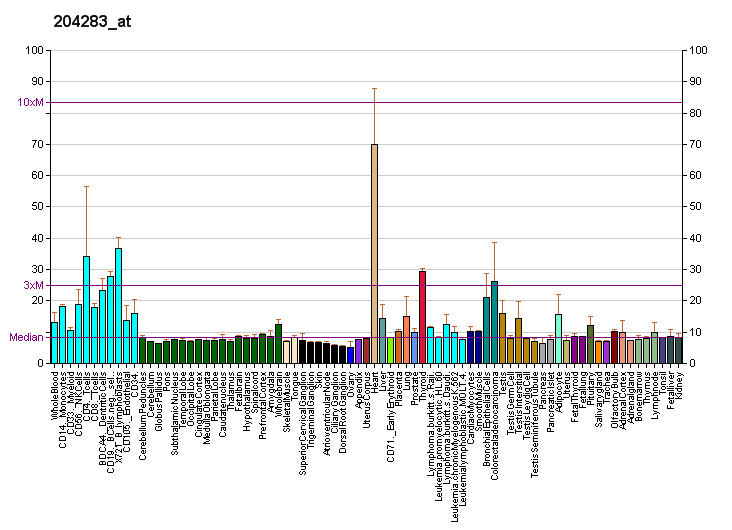

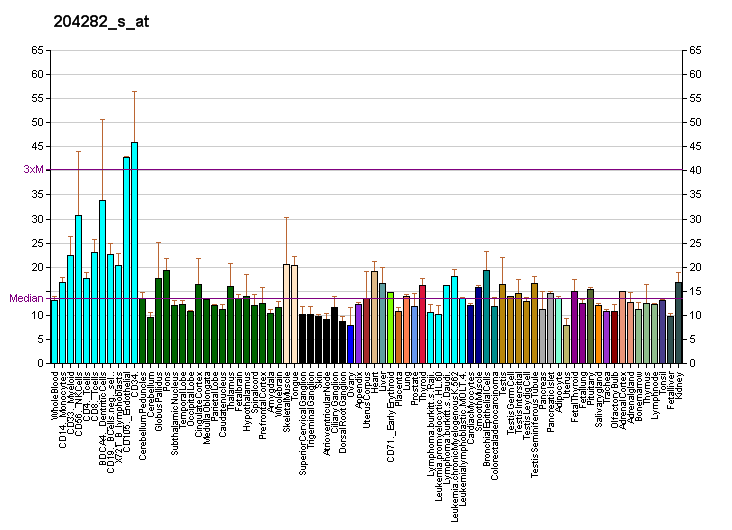
RNA expression pattern
Bgee	Human / Mouse (ortholog); Top expressed in: triceps brachii muscle; endothelial cell; glutes; gonad; skeletal muscle tissue; deltoid muscle; epithelium of bronchus; Skeletal muscle tissue of rectus abdominis; nasal epithelium; quadriceps femoris muscle / Top expressed in: dentate gyrus of hippocampal formation granule cell; spermatocyte; zygote; spermatid; choroid plexus of fourth ventricle; interventricular septum; secondary oocyte; right kidney; Rostral migratory stream; Epithelium of choroid plexus; More reference expression data
BioGPS	More reference expression data
Gene ontology
Molecular function	ligase activity; nucleotide binding; protein binding; aminoacyl-tRNA ligase activity; ATP binding; tRNA binding; phenylalanine-tRNA ligase activity
Cellular component	cytoplasm; mitochondrial matrix; mitochondrion
Biological process	tRNA aminoacylation; protein biosynthesis; phenylalanyl-tRNA aminoacylation; tRNA aminoacylation for protein translation; tRNA processing
Sources:Amigo / QuickGO
Orthologs
Databases	NCBI: entry; OMA: entry
Species	Human	Mouse
Entrez	10667	69955
Ensembl	ENSG00000145982	ENSMUSG00000021420
UniProt	O95363	Q99M01
RefSeq (mRNA)	NM_006567; NM_001318872	NM_001039189; NM_024274
RefSeq (protein)	NP_001305801; NP_006558; NP_001361804; NP_001361805; NP_001361806 NP_001361807; NP_001361808; NP_001362186; NP_001362187; NP_001362188; NP_001362189	NP_001034278; NP_077236
Location (UCSC)	Chr 6: 5.26 – 5.83 Mb	Chr 13: 36.12 – 36.73 Mb
PubMed search
- Wikidata
View/Edit Human	View/Edit Mouse

Phenylalanine–tRNA ligase, mitochondrial, also called Phenylalanyl-tRNA synthetase 2 (FARS2), is an enzyme that in humans is encoded by the FARS2 gene (previously FARS1). Like the cytosolic enzyme (with subunits FARSA and FARSB), this enzyme functions as a Phenylalanine–tRNA ligase, which means it functions to attach the amino acid phenylalanine to the corresponding transfer RNA (tRNA^{Phe}) in preparation of RNA-to-protein translation.

This protein encoded by FARS2 localizes to the mitochondrion and plays a role in mitochondrial protein translation. Mutations in this gene have been associated with combined oxidative phosphorylation deficiency 14, also known as Alpers encephalopathy, as well as spastic paraplegia 77 and infantile-onset epilepsy and cytochrome c oxidase deficiency.

== Structure ==
FARS2 is located on the p arm of chromosome 6 in position 25.1 and has 15 exons. This gene encodes a member of the class-II aminoacyl-tRNA synthetase family. FARS2 is a phenylalanine-tRNA synthetase (PheRS) localized to the mitochondrion which consists of a single polypeptide chain, unlike the (alpha-beta)2 structure of the prokaryotic and eukaryotic cytoplasmic forms of PheRS. Structure analysis and catalytic properties indicate mitochondrial PheRSs may constitute a class of PheRS distinct from the enzymes found in prokaryotes and in the eukaryotic cytoplasm.

== Function ==
Aminoacyl-tRNA synthetases are a class of enzymes that charge tRNAs with their cognate amino acids. FARS2 charges tRNA(Phe) with phenylalanine and catalyzes direct attachment of m-Tyr (an oxidized version of Phe) to tRNA(Phe). This makes it important for mitochondrial translation and for delivery of the misacylated tRNA to the ribosome and incorporation of ROS-damaged amino acid into proteins. Alternative splicing results in multiple transcript variants.

=== Catalytic activity ===
ATP + L-phenylalanine + tRNA(Phe) = AMP + diphosphate + L-phenylalanyl-tRNA(Phe)

== Clinical significance ==
Mutations in FARS2 have been associated to combined oxidative phosphorylation deficiency 14, spastic paraplegia 77, and infantile-onset epilepsy and cytochrome c oxidase deficiency. Both combined oxidative phosphorylation deficiency 14 and spastic paraplegia 77 are autosomal recessive in nature and have been linked to several pathogenic variants including Y144C, I329T, D391V, and D142Y. Combined oxidative phosphorylation deficiency 14 is characterized by neonatal onset of global developmental delay, refractory seizures, lactic acidosis, and deficiencies of multiple mitochondrial respiratory enzymes. Spastic paraplegia, meanwhile, is a neurodegenerative disorder characterized by a slow, gradual, progressive weakness and spasticity of the lower limbs, with patients often exhibiting difficulty with balance, weakness and stiffness in the legs, muscle spasms, and dragging the toes when walking. One case of infantile-onset epilepsy and cytochrome c oxidase deficiency resulting from a FARS2 Asp325Tyr missense mutation has also been reported. Early-onset epilepsy, neurological deficits, and complex IV deficiency are the main characteristics of the disease stemming from this mutation.

== Interactions ==
FARS2 has been shown to have 193 binary protein-protein interactions including 12 co-complex interactions. FARS2 appears to interact with RCBTB2, KRTAP10-9, CALCOCO2, KRT40, MID2, APPL1, IKZF3, KRT13, TADA2A, STX11, TRIM27, KRTAP10-5, KRTAP10-7, TFCP2, MKRN3, KRT31, HMBOX1, AGTRAP, ADAMTSL4, NOTCH2NL, CMTM5, TRIM54, FSD2, CYSRT1, HIGD1C, homez, SPRY1, ZNF500, KRT34, YIF1A, BAG4, TPM2, SYP, KRTAP10-8, KRTAP1-1, AP1B1, TRAF2, GRB10, MESD, TRIP6, CCDC152, BEX5, FHL5, MORN3, DGAT2L6, ZNF438, KCTD17, ZNF655, BANP, SPERT, NFKBID, ZNF526, PCSK5, DVL3, AJUBA, PPP1R16B, MDFI, DPH2, CDCA4, KRTAP3-3, BACH2, KCNF1, MAN1C1, RIMBP3, ZRANB1, ISY1, FKBP7, and E7.

== See also ==
- Phenylalanine–tRNA ligase alpha subunit
- Phenylalanine–tRNA ligase beta subunit
