= ATL2 =

ATL2 may refer to:

- ATL2, a version of the Bréguet 1150 Atlantic, also known as Atlantique 2
- Atlastin-2, one of three Atlastin proteins in vertebrates
