= AP4S1 =

Protein-coding gene in humans

Identifiers
- Aliases: AP4S1, AP47B, CLA20, CLAPS4, CPSQ6, SPG52, adaptor related protein complex 4 sigma 1 subunit, adaptor related protein complex 4 subunit sigma 1
- External IDs: OMIM: 607243; MGI: 1337065; GeneCards: AP4S1

Gene location (Human)
Chr.	Chromosome 14 (human)
Band	14q12	Start	31,025,106 bp
Band	14q12	End	31,130,996 bp

Gene location (Mouse)
Chr.	Chromosome 12 (mouse)
Band	12|12 B3	Start	51,737,816 bp
Band	12|12 B3	End	51,791,569 bp
RNA expression pattern
Bgee	Human / Mouse (ortholog); Top expressed in: endothelial cell; Achilles tendon; Brodmann area 23; middle temporal gyrus; prefrontal cortex; primary visual cortex; gonad; epithelium of colon; Brodmann area 9; corpus callosum / Top expressed in: intercostal muscle; temporal muscle; extensor digitorum longus muscle; plantaris muscle; sternocleidomastoid muscle; interventricular septum; digastric muscle; triceps brachii muscle; right ventricle; myocardium of ventricle; More reference expression data
BioGPS	n/a
Orthologs
Databases	NCBI: entry; OMA: entry
Species	Human	Mouse
Entrez	11154	11782
Ensembl	ENSG00000100478	ENSMUSG00000020955
UniProt	Q9Y587	Q9WVL1
RefSeq (mRNA)	NM_001128126; NM_001254726; NM_001254727; NM_001254728; NM_001254729 NM_007077	NM_021710; NM_001329698; NM_001329699
RefSeq (protein)	NP_001121598; NP_001241655; NP_001241656; NP_001241657; NP_001241658 NP_009008	NP_001316627; NP_001316628; NP_068356
Location (UCSC)	Chr 14: 31.03 – 31.13 Mb	Chr 12: 51.74 – 51.79 Mb
PubMed search
- Wikidata
View/Edit Human	View/Edit Mouse

AP-4 complex subunit sigma-1 is a protein that in humans is encoded by the AP4S1 gene.

== Function ==
The heterotetrameric adaptor protein (AP) complexes sort integral membrane proteins at various stages of the endocytic and secretory pathways. AP4 is composed of 2 large chains, beta-4 (AP4B1) and epsilon-4 (AP4E1), a medium chain, mu-4 (AP4M1), and a small chain, sigma-4 (AP4S1, this gene).

== Clinical relevance ==
Deficiency of AP-4 leads to childhood-onset hereditary spastic paraplegia and it is currently hypothesized that AP4-complex-mediated trafficking plays a crucial role in brain development and functioning.

== See also ==
- AP2 adaptor complex
