= SPG15 (disease) =

Genetic disorder

- Specialty: Neurology
- Frequency: 0.0001%

Spastic paraplegia 15 (SPG15) is a form of hereditary spastic paraplegia that commonly becomes apparent during childhood or adolescence (e.g. between ages 5 and 18 years). The disease is caused by mutations within the ZFYVE26 gene - also known as the SPG15 gene - and is passed down in an autosomal recessive manner.

The disease is characterised by progressive spasticity that starts within the lower extremities and spreads to the upper body and limbs. This can be accompanied by other manifestations, such as developmental delay or learning disability, often preceding motor involvement amongst others. There have also been "extremely rare" cases of onset in adulthood.

== Signs and symptoms ==
Hereditary spastic paraplegia (HSP) type 15 is characterised by slowly progressive muscle stiffness (spasticity) and paralysis (paraplegia) in the lower limbs, resulting in gait disturbances. Symptoms usually appear during childhood or early adulthood. The disease also affects the upper limbs, and includes additional symptoms, which makes this type of HSP a complicated type (see Hereditary spastic paraplegia for clarification of complicated and uncomplicated HSPs). The additional symptoms include mild intellectual disability, mild cerebellar ataxia, peripheral neuropathy (with distal upper limb amyotrophy) and retinal degeneration.

Symptoms noted in patients (some of them may present or progress at different times over the course of the disease):

- Spastic paraplegia: Spasticity (excessive and inappropriate muscle activation) and weakness in the lower limbs leading to a shuffling gait and difficulty walking. Lower extremities are affected earlier, and with higher severity than upper extremities.
- Dystonia: abnormally increased muscular tone that causes fixed abnormal postures
- Ataxia: lack of coordination between muscles, limbs and joints; lack of ability to judge distances; inability to perform rapid movements
- Cognitive impairment: patients may present with unaffected intellectual abilities, learning disabilities, mild to moderate intellectual disability or progressive cognitive decline.
- Issues with bladder control: urinary urgency, incontinence

Depending on the severity in patients, mutations in SPG15 can cause other neurological complications such as:

- Parkinsonism: signs and symptoms appearing in Parkinson's disease such as imbalance, tremor, slowness and stiffness.
- Visual Impairment (Kjellin Syndrome)
- Dementia
- Involuntary movements
- Dysarthria: speech disorder characterized by poor articulation
- Peripheral axonal neuropathy: over time there is a loss of muscle volume and damage of the nerves in the lower limbs, causing pain and numbness.
- Seizures
- Adducted thumbs in some cases

== Genetics ==
SPG15 is passed down from both parents to their child in an autosomal recessive manner. This means that each parent carries a pathogenic variant in one copy of the ZFYVE26 gene. If both pathogenic variants, one from mum and one from dad, are present in the child then there will be disease onset (25% of cases). If only one variant from mum or dad is passed to the child then they will simply be a carrier (50% chance of cases). Finally, in the optimal situation, neither of the variants will be passed to the child (25% chance of cases). It is possible to conduct prenatal genetic testing in families where the parents have been identified as carriers.

== Pathophysiology ==
At the molecular level, SPG15 is caused by loss of function mutations in the ZFYVE26 gene, encoding the protein spastizin. This protein is involved in the regulation of endosome and autophagosome reformation. The exact mechanism of action of cellular locations of spastizin have not been totally elucidated yet, but it is generally accepted that it interacts with the protein spatacsin and a complex containing AP5Z1, that when mutated are responsible for other forms of HSP, SPG11 and SPG48. These proteins have been localised to late endosomes and lysosomes and their function is considered to be important in endosomes and lysosome homeostasis. Mouse models with Zfyve26 mutations show abnormal accumulation of vesicle-like structures, which leads to degeneration of the nerves and the development of the typical signs of the disease.

== Diagnosis ==
Diagnosis is initially by difficulties in walking (specifically Spasticity) that are not explainable by other common causes. This is followed up by brain imaging (Magnetic resonance imaging), with a particular focus on the thickness of the corpus callosum. Final confirmation is by genetic testing to establish whether there are causal variants in both copies of the ZFYVE26 gene.

== Management ==
Current treatment options are focussed on the management of symptoms and need to be assessed for the individual patient

== Prognosis ==
Currently the number of patients diagnosed with SPG15 is very small and there has been insufficient long-term follow-up to give confident predictions of progression, impact and care needs.

== Research directions ==
Research is focussed on the fundamental understanding of the SPG15 protein in maintaining normal cell function and how this related degeneration of nerve cells

== Epidemiology ==
SPG15 is classified as a rare disease with a prevalence of around ~75 individuals worldwide ranging from Europe, North and South America, the Middle East, East Asia. As genetic testing becomes more readily available and affordable, more patients will be identified.
