= ZFYVE27 =

Protein-coding gene in the species Homo sapiens

Identifiers
- Aliases: ZFYVE27, PROTRUDIN, SPG33, zinc finger FYVE-type containing 27
- External IDs: OMIM: 610243; MGI: 1919602; GeneCards: ZFYVE27
Available structures
| PDB | Ortholog search: PDBe RCSB |
| PDB | List of PDB id codes 1X4U |

Gene location (Human)
| Chr. | Chromosome 10 (human) |
| Band | 10q24.2 | Start | 97,737,121 bp |
| Band | 10q24.2 | End | 97,760,907 bp |

Gene location (Mouse)
| Chr. | Chromosome 19 (mouse) |
| Band | 19|19 C3 | Start | 42,152,390 bp |
| Band | 19|19 C3 | End | 42,183,029 bp |
RNA expression pattern
| Bgee | Human / Mouse (ortholog); Top expressed in: pancreatic ductal cell; right hemisphere of cerebellum; mucosa of ileum; right uterine tube; anterior pituitary; left ovary; mucosa of transverse colon; right frontal lobe; right ovary; tibial nerve / Top expressed in: granulocyte; neural layer of retina; substantia nigra; superior frontal gyrus; visual cortex; primary visual cortex; dentate gyrus of hippocampal formation granule cell; vestibular membrane of cochlear duct; trigeminal ganglion; facial motor nucleus; More reference expression data |
| BioGPS | n/a |
Gene ontology
| Molecular function | protein binding; metal ion binding; protein self-association |
| Cellular component | cytoplasm; integral component of membrane; axon; endosome; recycling endosome membrane; growth cone membrane; dendrite; plasma membrane; cell projection; endoplasmic reticulum membrane; endoplasmic reticulum; membrane; integral component of endoplasmic reticulum membrane; endoplasmic reticulum tubular network; nucleoplasm; cytosol |
| Biological process | protein localization to plasma membrane; neuron projection development; neurotrophin TRK receptor signaling pathway; vesicle-mediated transport; positive regulation of axon extension; endoplasmic reticulum tubular network formation |
Sources:Amigo / QuickGO
Orthologs
| Databases | NCBI: entry; OMA: entry |
| Species | Human | Mouse |
| Entrez | 118813 | 319740 |
| Ensembl | ENSG00000155256 | ENSMUSG00000018820 |
| UniProt | Q5T4F4 | Q3TXX3 |
| RefSeq (mRNA) | NM_001002261; NM_001002262; NM_001174119; NM_001174120; NM_001174121 NM_001174122; NM_144588 | NM_001164531; NM_177319 |
| RefSeq (protein) | NP_001002261; NP_001002262; NP_001167590; NP_001167591; NP_001167592 NP_001167593; NP_653189 | NP_001158003; NP_796293 |
| Location (UCSC) | Chr 10: 97.74 – 97.76 Mb | Chr 19: 42.15 – 42.18 Mb |
| PubMed search |
- Wikidata
| View/Edit Human | View/Edit Mouse |

Zinc finger, FYVE domain containing 27 is a protein that in humans is encoded by the ZFYVE27 gene.

== Function ==
This gene encodes a protein with several Transmembrane domains, a Rab11-binding domain and a lipid-binding FYVE finger domain. The encoded protein appears to promote Neurite formation. A mutation in this gene has been reported to be associated with Hereditary spastic paraplegia, however the Pathogenicity of the mutation, which may simply represent a Polymorphism (biology), is unclear. [provided by RefSeq, Mar 2010].
