= Acetyl-coenzyme A transporter 1 =

Protein-coding gene in the species Homo sapiens

SLC33A1

Identifiers
- Aliases: SLC33A1, ACATN, AT-1, AT1, CCHLND, SPG42, solute carrier family 33 member 1
- External IDs: OMIM: 603690; MGI: 1332247; GeneCards: SLC33A1

Gene location (Human)
Chr.	Chromosome 3 (human)
Band	3q25.31	Start	155,821,024 bp
Band	3q25.31	End	155,854,456 bp

Gene location (Mouse)
Chr.	Chromosome 3 (mouse)
Band	3|3 E1	Start	63,840,928 bp
Band	3|3 E1	End	63,872,189 bp
RNA expression pattern
Bgee	Human / Mouse (ortholog); Top expressed in: corpus epididymis; body of pancreas; islet of Langerhans; Epithelium of choroid plexus; sperm; endothelial cell; seminal vesicula; stromal cell of endometrium; kidney tubule; caput epididymis / Top expressed in: lacrimal gland; parotid gland; seminal vesicula; right kidney; Epithelium of choroid plexus; submandibular gland; islet of Langerhans; proximal tubule; spermatid; spermatocyte; More reference expression data
BioGPS	n/a
Gene ontology
Molecular function	acetyl-CoA transmembrane transporter activity; solute:proton symporter activity
Cellular component	integral component of membrane; Golgi membrane; integral component of plasma membrane; endoplasmic reticulum membrane; membrane; endoplasmic reticulum
Biological process	SMAD protein signal transduction; BMP signaling pathway; transmembrane transport; acetyl-CoA transport; transport; proton transmembrane transport
Sources:Amigo / QuickGO
Orthologs
Databases	NCBI: entry; OMA: entry
Species	Human	Mouse
Entrez	9197	11416
Ensembl	ENSG00000169359	ENSMUSG00000027822
UniProt	O00400	Q99J27
RefSeq (mRNA)	NM_001190992; NM_004733; NM_001363883	NM_001272035; NM_015728; NM_001331067
RefSeq (protein)	NP_001177921; NP_004724; NP_001350812	NP_001258964; NP_001317996; NP_056543
Location (UCSC)	Chr 3: 155.82 – 155.85 Mb	Chr 3: 63.84 – 63.87 Mb
PubMed search
- Wikidata
View/Edit Human	View/Edit Mouse

Acetyl-coenzyme A transporter 1 also known as solute carrier family 33 member 1 (SLC33A1) is a protein that in humans is encoded by the SLC33A1 gene.

== Function ==
The protein encoded by this gene is required for the formation of O-acetylated (Ac) gangliosides. The encoded protein is predicted to contain 6 to 10 transmembrane domains, and a leucine zipper motif in transmembrane domain III.

== Clinical significance ==
Defects in this gene have been reported to cause spastic paraplegia autosomal dominant type 42 (SPG42) in one Chinese family, but not in similar patients of European descent.
