= FA2H =

Protein-coding gene in the species Homo sapiens

Identifiers
- Aliases: FA2H, FAAH, FAH1, FAXDC1, SCS7, SPG35, fatty acid 2-hydroxylase
- External IDs: OMIM: 611026; MGI: 2443327; GeneCards: FA2H

Gene location (Human)
Chr.	Chromosome 16 (human)
Band	16q23.1	Start	74,712,955 bp
Band	16q23.1	End	74,774,831 bp

Gene location (Mouse)
Chr.	Chromosome 8 (mouse)
Band	8|8 E1	Start	112,071,767 bp
Band	8|8 E1	End	112,120,456 bp
RNA expression pattern
Bgee	Human / Mouse (ortholog); Top expressed in: C1 segment; corpus callosum; inferior olivary nucleus; inferior ganglion of vagus nerve; dorsal motor nucleus of vagus nerve; optic nerve; olfactory bulb; subthalamic nucleus; sural nerve; substantia nigra / Top expressed in: skin of external ear; lip; sciatic nerve; epithelium of stomach; transitional epithelium of urinary bladder; deep cerebellar nuclei; pontine nuclei; pyloric antrum; ventral tegmental area; zygote; More reference expression data
BioGPS	n/a
Gene ontology
Molecular function	iron ion binding; metal ion binding; heme binding; oxidoreductase activity; fatty acid alpha-hydroxylase activity
Cellular component	integral component of membrane; organelle membrane; endoplasmic reticulum membrane; membrane; intracellular membrane-bounded organelle; endoplasmic reticulum
Biological process	central nervous system myelin maintenance; lipid modification; peripheral nervous system myelin maintenance; lipid metabolism; sphingolipid biosynthetic process; fatty acid metabolic process; fatty acid biosynthetic process; regulation of cell population proliferation; regulation of hair cycle; sebaceous gland cell differentiation; lipid biosynthetic process; glucosylceramide biosynthetic process; galactosylceramide biosynthetic process; plasma membrane raft organization; ceramide biosynthetic process; establishment of skin barrier
Sources:Amigo / QuickGO
Orthologs
Databases	NCBI: entry; OMA: entry
Species	Human	Mouse
Entrez	79152	338521
Ensembl	ENSG00000103089	ENSMUSG00000033579
UniProt	Q7L5A8	Q5MPP0
RefSeq (mRNA)	NM_024306	NM_178086
RefSeq (protein)	NP_077282	NP_835187
Location (UCSC)	Chr 16: 74.71 – 74.77 Mb	Chr 8: 112.07 – 112.12 Mb
PubMed search
- Wikidata
View/Edit Human	View/Edit Mouse

Fatty acid 2-hydroxylase is a protein that in humans is encoded by the FA2H gene.

== Function ==
This gene encodes a protein that catalyzes the synthesis of 2-hydroxysphingolipids, a subset of sphingolipids that contain 2-hydroxy fatty acids. Sphingolipids play roles in many cellular processes and their structural diversity arises from modification of the hydrophobic ceramide moiety, such as by 2-hydroxylation of the N-acyl chain, and the existence of many different head groups.

Mechanism of 2-hydroxylated sphingolipid generation. They are generated like their non-hydroxylated counterparts, except that fatty acids are hydroxylated by fatty acid 2-hydroxylase (FA2H) before being incorporated into dihydroceramide by ceramide synthases (CerS).

== Clinical significance ==
Mutations in this gene have been associated with leukodystrophy dysmyelinating with hereditary spastic paraplegia type 35 (SPG35) with or without dystonia as well as fatty acid hydroxylase-associated neurodegeneration. The largest cohort with a detailed phenotypical description and a highly sensitive imaging phenotype ("WHAT"—white matter changes, hypointensity of the globus pallidus, ponto-cerebellar atrophy, and thin corpus callosum) was published in June 2019.

FA2H has been shown to modulate cell differentiation in vitro. FA2H may be a Δ^{9}-THC-regulated gene, as Δ^{9}-THC induces differentiation signal(s) in poorly differentiated MDA-MB-231 cells.
