= AP4E1 =

Protein-coding gene in the species Homo sapiens

Identifiers
- Aliases: AP4E1, CPSQ4, SPG51, STUT1, adaptor related protein complex 4 epsilon 1 subunit, adaptor related protein complex 4 subunit epsilon 1
- External IDs: OMIM: 607244; MGI: 1336993; GeneCards: AP4E1

Gene location (Human)
Chr.	Chromosome 15 (human)
Band	15q21.2	Start	50,908,672 bp
Band	15q21.2	End	51,005,895 bp

Gene location (Mouse)
Chr.	Chromosome 2 (mouse)
Band	2 F1|2 61.76 cM	Start	126,850,637 bp
Band	2 F1|2 61.76 cM	End	126,909,829 bp
RNA expression pattern
Bgee	Human / Mouse (ortholog); Top expressed in: gingival epithelium; buccal mucosa cell; palpebral conjunctiva; testicle; human penis; amniotic fluid; Achilles tendon; epithelium of nasopharynx; tibia; Skeletal muscle tissue of biceps brachii / Top expressed in: hand; cumulus cell; foot; Rostral migratory stream; human fetus; triceps brachii muscle; left lung lobe; vastus lateralis muscle; vas deferens; medial head of gastrocnemius muscle; More reference expression data
BioGPS	n/a
Gene ontology
Molecular function	protein binding
Cellular component	membrane coat; Golgi apparatus; trans-Golgi network membrane; endosome lumen; membrane; AP-4 adaptor complex
Biological process	protein transport; intracellular protein transport; vesicle-mediated transport; protein targeting; protein localization
Sources:Amigo / QuickGO
Orthologs
Databases	NCBI: entry; OMA: entry
Species	Human	Mouse
Entrez	23431	108011
Ensembl	ENSG00000081014	ENSMUSG00000001998
UniProt	Q9UPM8	Q80V94
RefSeq (mRNA)	NM_001252127; NM_007347	NM_175550
RefSeq (protein)	NP_001239056; NP_031373	NP_780759
Location (UCSC)	Chr 15: 50.91 – 51.01 Mb	Chr 2: 126.85 – 126.91 Mb
PubMed search
- Wikidata
View/Edit Human	View/Edit Mouse

AP-4 complex subunit epsilon-1 is a protein that in humans is encoded by the AP4E1 gene.

== Function ==
The heterotetrameric adaptor protein (AP) complexes sort integral membrane proteins at various stages of the endocytic and secretory pathways. AP4 is composed of 2 large chains, beta-4 (AP4B1) and epsilon-4 (AP4E1; this gene), a medium chain, mu-4 (AP4M1), and a small chain, sigma-4 (AP4S1).

== Clinical relevance ==
It is currently hypothesized that AP4-complex-mediated trafficking plays a crucial role in brain development and functioning.
