= ERLIN1 =

Protein-coding gene in the species Homo sapiens

Identifiers
- Aliases: ERLIN1, C10orf69, Erlin-1, KE04, KEO4, SPFH1, SPG62, ER lipid raft associated 1
- External IDs: OMIM: 611604; MGI: 2387613; GeneCards: ERLIN1

Gene location (Human)
Chr.	Chromosome 10 (human)
Band	10q24.31	Start	100,150,094 bp
Band	10q24.31	End	100,186,033 bp

Gene location (Mouse)
Chr.	Chromosome 19 (mouse)
Band	19|19 C3	Start	44,023,383 bp
Band	19|19 C3	End	44,058,224 bp
RNA expression pattern
Bgee	Human / Mouse (ortholog); Top expressed in: secondary oocyte; palpebral conjunctiva; gingival epithelium; tibia; bronchial epithelial cell; trabecular bone; human penis; liver; jejunal mucosa; placenta / Top expressed in: mucous cell of stomach; spermatocyte; epithelium of stomach; pyloric antrum; prostate; jejunum; cumulus cell; lumbar spinal ganglion; right kidney; lacrimal gland; More reference expression data
BioGPS	n/a
Gene ontology
Molecular function	cholesterol binding; protein binding; lipid binding; ubiquitin protein ligase binding
Cellular component	integral component of membrane; membrane; endoplasmic reticulum; endoplasmic reticulum membrane; protein-containing complex
Biological process	SREBP signaling pathway; steroid metabolic process; cholesterol metabolic process; negative regulation of cholesterol biosynthetic process; negative regulation of fatty acid biosynthetic process; lipid metabolism; ubiquitin-dependent ERAD pathway; transmembrane transport
Sources:Amigo / QuickGO
Orthologs
Databases	NCBI: entry; OMA: entry
Species	Human	Mouse
Entrez	10613	226144
Ensembl	ENSG00000107566	ENSMUSG00000025198
UniProt	O75477	Q91X78
RefSeq (mRNA)	NM_001100626; NM_001347856; NM_001347857; NM_001347858; NM_001347859 NM_001347860; NM_001347861; NM_006459	NM_001164359; NM_001164360; NM_145502
RefSeq (protein)	NP_001094096; NP_001334785; NP_001334786; NP_001334787; NP_001334788 NP_001334789; NP_001334790; NP_006450	NP_001157831; NP_001157832; NP_663477
Location (UCSC)	Chr 10: 100.15 – 100.19 Mb	Chr 19: 44.02 – 44.06 Mb
PubMed search
- Wikidata
View/Edit Human	View/Edit Mouse

Erlin-1 (Endoplasmic Reticulum lipid raft-associated 1) is a protein encoded by the ERLIN1 gene in humans. ERLIN1 and its homolog ERLIN2 are ER-localized members of the stomatin/prohibition/flotillin/HflKC (SPFH) family of proteins. They form a complex that functions to scaffold lipids and proteins. ERLIN1 and ERLIN2 are predicted to assemble in a large ring-shaped hetero-oligomeric complex, likely formed by 24 subunits, similar to other members of the SPFH family.

== Function ==
ERLIN1/2 are associated with cholesterol homeostasis. They interact with the SCAP–SREBP2–INSIG complex tightly under cholesterol repletion conditions, thus keeping this complex in the ER, where it is inactive. Silencing of ERLINs releases SREBP2 from the ER and allows it to travel to the Golgi, where it is processed and drives transcription of cholesterol synthesis genes. Activation of the SREBP2 pathway is as potent under ERLINs silencing as it is under cholesterol depletion conditions.
