= VPS37A =

Protein-coding gene in the species Homo sapiens

Identifiers
- Aliases: VPS37A, HCRP1, PQBP2, SPG53, ESCRT-I subunit
- External IDs: OMIM: 609927; MGI: 1261835; GeneCards: VPS37A

Gene location (Human)
Chr.	Chromosome 8 (human)
Band	8p22	Start	17,246,571 bp
Band	8p22	End	17,302,427 bp

Gene location (Mouse)
Chr.	Chromosome 8 (mouse)
Band	8 A4|8 23.89 cM	Start	40,511,783 bp
Band	8 A4|8 23.89 cM	End	40,551,134 bp
RNA expression pattern
Bgee	Human / Mouse (ortholog); Top expressed in: islet of Langerhans; gastrocnemius muscle; Achilles tendon; myocardium of left ventricle; right testis; tibialis anterior muscle; secondary oocyte; left testis; smooth muscle tissue; stromal cell of endometrium / Top expressed in: muscle of thigh; spermatocyte; retinal pigment epithelium; supraoptic nucleus; substantia nigra; spermatid; vestibular membrane of cochlear duct; ascending aorta; neural layer of retina; aortic valve; More reference expression data
BioGPS	n/a
Gene ontology
Molecular function	protein binding
Cellular component	endosome; centrosome; intracellular membrane-bounded organelle; late endosome membrane; membrane; nucleoplasm; endosome membrane; nucleus; cytosol; ESCRT I complex; host cell
Biological process	viral budding via host ESCRT complex; viral life cycle; multivesicular body assembly; endosomal transport; protein transport; ubiquitin-dependent protein catabolic process via the multivesicular body sorting pathway; macroautophagy; endosome transport via multivesicular body sorting pathway; protein targeting to membrane; protein targeting to vacuole; intracellular transport of virus
Sources:Amigo / QuickGO
Orthologs
Databases	NCBI: entry; OMA: entry
Species	Human	Mouse
Entrez	137492	52348
Ensembl	ENSG00000155975	ENSMUSG00000031600
UniProt	Q8NEZ2	Q8CHS8
RefSeq (mRNA)	NM_001145152; NM_152415	NM_033560
RefSeq (protein)	NP_001138624; NP_689628; NP_001350096; NP_001350097; NP_001350098 NP_001350099; NP_001350100; NP_001350101; NP_001350102	NP_291038
Location (UCSC)	Chr 8: 17.25 – 17.3 Mb	Chr 8: 40.51 – 40.55 Mb
PubMed search
- Wikidata
View/Edit Human	View/Edit Mouse

Vacuolar protein sorting 37 homolog A (S. cerevisiae) is a protein in humans that is encoded by the VPS37A gene. It is a member of the endosomal sorting complex required for transport (ESCRT) system.

== Clinical significance ==
A missense mutation (K382N) in VPS37A protein has been shown to cause complex hereditary spastic paraparesis (cHSP).
