= REEP2 =

Protein-coding gene in humans

Identifiers
- Aliases: REEP2, C5orf19, SGC32445, SPG72, Yip2d, receptor accessory protein 2
- External IDs: OMIM: 609347; MGI: 2385070; GeneCards: REEP2

Gene location (Human)
Chr.	Chromosome 5 (human)
Band	5q31.2	Start	138,439,057 bp
Band	5q31.2	End	138,446,969 bp

Gene location (Mouse)
Chr.	Chromosome 18 (mouse)
Band	18|18 B1	Start	34,973,642 bp
Band	18|18 B1	End	34,980,516 bp
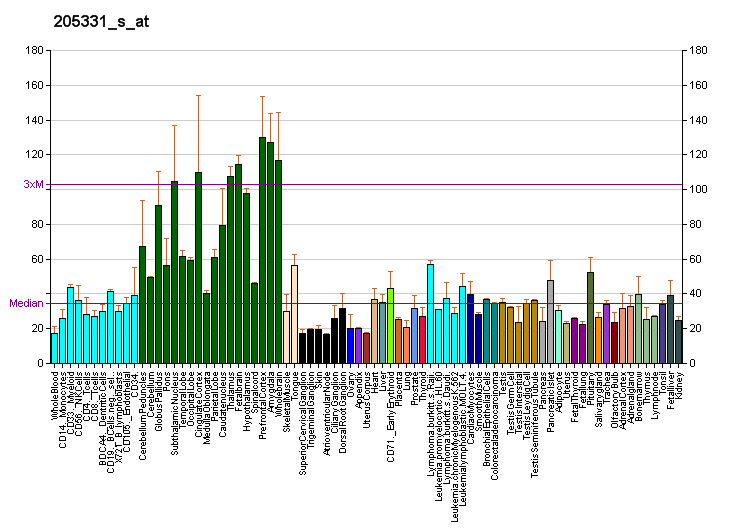
RNA expression pattern
Bgee	Human / Mouse (ortholog); Top expressed in: right hemisphere of cerebellum; right frontal lobe; cingulate gyrus; anterior cingulate cortex; Brodmann area 9; nucleus accumbens; prefrontal cortex; amygdala; anterior pituitary; putamen / Top expressed in: zygote; superior frontal gyrus; dentate gyrus of hippocampal formation granule cell; cerebellar cortex; primary visual cortex; neural layer of retina; secondary oocyte; supraoptic nucleus; spermatid; greater petrosal nerve; More reference expression data
BioGPS	More reference expression data
Gene ontology
Molecular function	taste receptor binding
Cellular component	integral component of membrane; cytoplasmic microtubule; integral component of plasma membrane; endoplasmic reticulum membrane; endoplasmic reticulum; membrane
Biological process	endoplasmic reticulum tubular network organization; sensory perception of bitter taste; sensory perception of sweet taste; protein transport into membrane raft; regulation of intracellular transport
Sources:Amigo / QuickGO
Orthologs
Databases	NCBI: entry; OMA: entry
Species	Human	Mouse
Entrez	51308	225362
Ensembl	ENSG00000132563	ENSMUSG00000038555
UniProt	Q9BRK0	Q8VCD6
RefSeq (mRNA)	NM_001271803; NM_016606	NM_001204914; NM_144865
RefSeq (protein)	NP_001258732; NP_057690	NP_001191843; NP_659114
Location (UCSC)	Chr 5: 138.44 – 138.45 Mb	Chr 18: 34.97 – 34.98 Mb
PubMed search
- Wikidata
View/Edit Human	View/Edit Mouse

Receptor expression-enhancing protein 2 is a protein that in humans is encoded by the REEP2 gene.

== Function ==
The protein encoded by REEP2 belongs to a family of proteins with receptor enhancing expression capabilities, including possible enhancement of G protein-coupled receptors. The REEP2 protein shows a restricted mode of expression in human tissues.

== Clinical significance ==
REEP2 mutations have been reported in families with hereditary spastic paraplegia.
