= CYP2U1 =

Protein-coding gene in the species Homo sapiens

Identifiers
- Aliases: CYP2U1, P450TEC, SPG49, SPG56, cytochrome P450 family 2 subfamily U member 1
- External IDs: OMIM: 610670; MGI: 1918769; GeneCards: CYP2U1
Enzyme activity
EC #	BRENDA	ExPASy	KEGG	MetaCyc
1.14.14.80	↗	↗	↗	↗

Gene location (Human)
Chr.	Chromosome 4 (human)
Band	4q25	Start	107,931,549 bp
Band	4q25	End	107,953,461 bp

Gene location (Mouse)
Chr.	Chromosome 3 (mouse)
Band	3|3 G3	Start	131,082,090 bp
Band	3|3 G3	End	131,096,876 bp
RNA expression pattern
Bgee	Human / Mouse (ortholog); Top expressed in: thymus; germinal epithelium; pancreatic epithelial cell; parietal pleura; tibialis anterior muscle; islet of Langerhans; cardiac muscle tissue of right atrium; pancreatic ductal cell; Achilles tendon; mucosa of ileum / Top expressed in: hepatobiliary system; liver; white adipose tissue; heart; skeletal muscle tissue; muscle of thigh; spermatocyte; cerebellum; cerebellar cortex; striatum of neuraxis; More reference expression data
BioGPS	n/a
Gene ontology
Molecular function	iron ion binding; oxidoreductase activity; aromatase activity; oxidoreductase activity, acting on paired donors, with incorporation or reduction of molecular oxygen, reduced flavin or flavoprotein as one donor, and incorporation of one atom of oxygen; heme binding; oxidoreductase activity, acting on paired donors, with incorporation or reduction of molecular oxygen; metal ion binding; monooxygenase activity; steroid hydroxylase activity
Cellular component	integral component of membrane; organelle membrane; endoplasmic reticulum membrane; endoplasmic reticulum; membrane; intracellular membrane-bounded organelle; cytoplasm
Biological process	omega-hydroxylase P450 pathway; organic acid metabolic process; xenobiotic metabolic process
Sources:Amigo / QuickGO
Orthologs
Databases	NCBI: entry; OMA: entry
Species	Human	Mouse
Entrez	113612	71519
Ensembl	ENSG00000155016	ENSMUSG00000027983
UniProt	Q7Z449	Q9CX98
RefSeq (mRNA)	NM_183075	NM_027816
RefSeq (protein)	NP_898898	NP_082092
Location (UCSC)	Chr 4: 107.93 – 107.95 Mb	Chr 3: 131.08 – 131.1 Mb
PubMed search
- Wikidata
View/Edit Human	View/Edit Mouse

CYP2U1 (cytochrome P450, family 2, subfamily U, polypeptide 1) is a protein that in humans is encoded by the CYP2U1 gene

== Function ==
This gene encodes a member of the cytochrome P450 superfamily of enzymes. The cytochrome P450 proteins are monooxygenases which catalyze many reactions involved in drug metabolism and synthesis of cholesterol, steroids and the hydroxylation of fatty acids and fatty acid metabolites. CYP2U1 metabolized arachidonic acid, docosahexaenoic acid (DHA), and other long chain fatty acids which suggests that CYP2U1 may play a role in brain and immune functions. CYP2U1 also metabolizes propanone, acetone, and 2-oxypropane.

== Tissue distribution ==
The CYP2U1 gene is a highly conserved gene that is mainly expressed in brain and thymus, but also at lower levels in kidney, lung, and heart.

== Reactions ==
CYP2U1 hydroxylates arachidonic acid, docosahexaenoic acid (DHA), and other long chain fatty acids at their terminal (i.e., ω) carbon to form 20-hydroxy-arachidonic acid (i.e. 20-Hydroxyeicosatetraenoic acid or 20-HETE), 22-hydroxy-docosahexaneoic acid, and other ω-hydroxy long chain fatty acids, respectively, plus lesser amounts of these fatty acids ω-1 hydroxy metabolites, i.e. 19-HETE, 21-hydroxy-docosahexaenoic acid, and other ω-1 hydroxy long chain fatty acids, respectively. One of these metabolites, 20-HETE, is a regulator of blood pressure and blood flow to organs in animal models and, based on genetic studies, possibly in humans (see 20-Hydroxyeicosatetraenoic acid).

== Clinical significance ==
A mutation (c.947A>T) in CYP2U1 has been associated in a very small number of patients with hereditary spastic paraplegia in that it segregates with the disease at the homozygous state in two afflicted families. This mutation affects an amino acid (p.Asp316Val) that is highly conserved among CYP2U1 orthologs as well as other cytochrome P450 proteins; this p.Asp314Val mutation is located in the enzyme's functional domain, is predicted to be damaging to the enzyme's activity, and is associated with mitochondria dysfunction. A second homozygous enzyme-disabling mutation has been identified in CYP2U1, c.1A>C/p.Met1?, that is associated with <1% of hereditary spastic paraplegia sufferers. The reduction in 20-HETE production by these mutations, and thereby in 20-HETE's activation of the TRPV1 neural receptor, it is hypothesized, may contribute to the development of this disease (see 20-Hydroxyeicosatetraenoic acid for details).

CYPU21 along with members of the CYP4A and CYP4F sub-families also ω-hydroxylate and thereby reduce the activity of various fatty acid metabolites of arachidonic acid including LTB4, 5-HETE, 5-oxo-eicosatetraenoic acid, 12-HETE, and several prostaglandins that are involved in regulating various inflammatory, vascular, and other responses in animals and humans. This hydroxylation-induced inactivation may underlie the proposed roles of the cytochromes in dampening inflammatory responses and the reported associations of certain CYP4F2 and CYP4F3 single nucleotide variants with human Krohn's disease and Coeliac disease, respectively.
