= RAB3GAP1 =

Protein-coding gene in the species Homo sapiens

Identifiers
- Aliases: RAB3GAP1, P130, RAB3GAP, RAB3GAP130, WARBM1, RAB3 GTPase activating protein catalytic subunit 1, MARTS2
- External IDs: OMIM: 602536; MGI: 2445001; GeneCards: RAB3GAP1

Gene location (Human)
Chr.	Chromosome 2 (human)
Band	2q21.3	Start	135,052,289 bp
Band	2q21.3	End	135,176,667 bp

Gene location (Mouse)
Chr.	Chromosome 1 (mouse)
Band	1|1 E3	Start	127,796,510 bp
Band	1|1 E3	End	127,871,605 bp
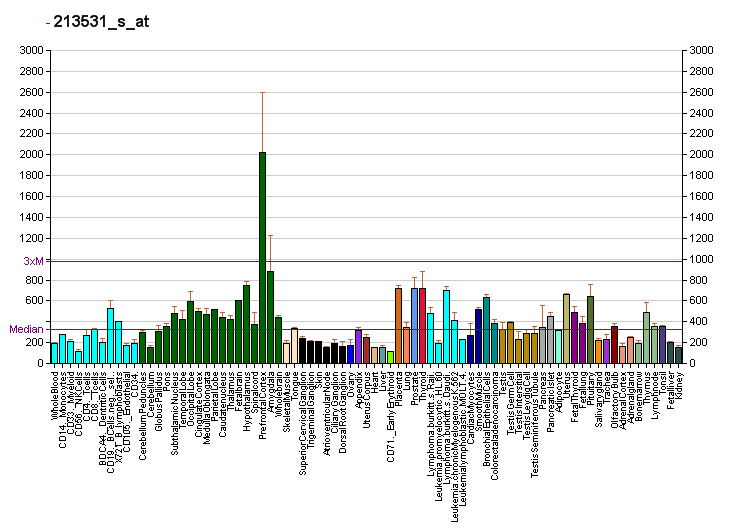

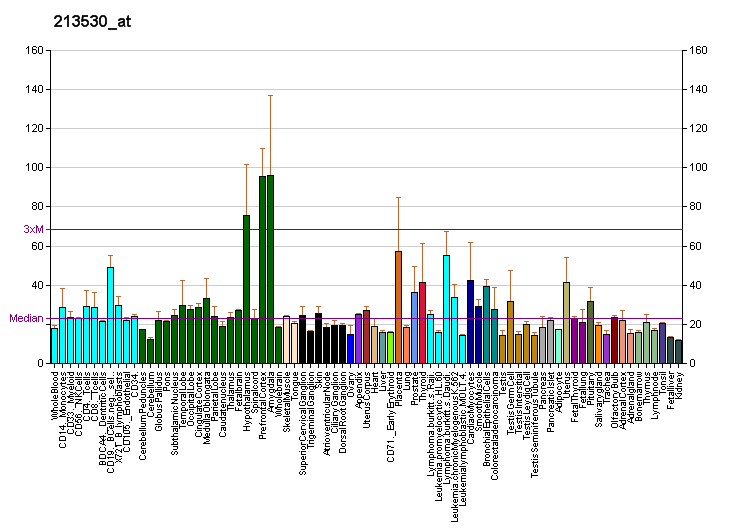

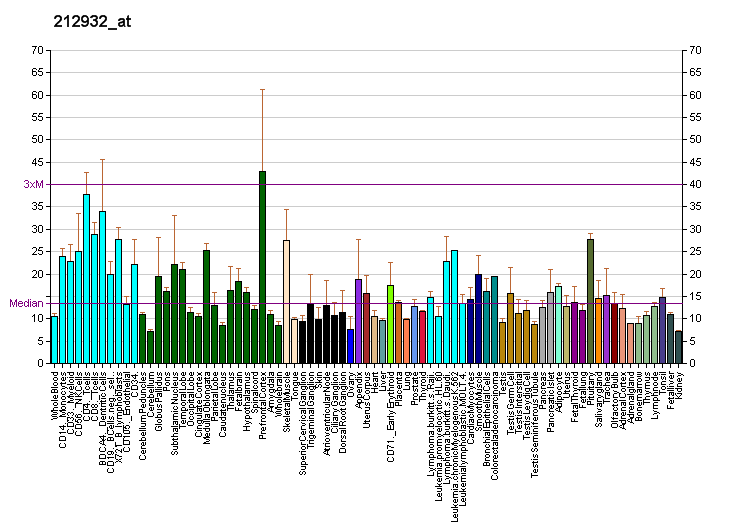
RNA expression pattern
Bgee	Human / Mouse (ortholog); Top expressed in: hair follicle; Brodmann area 23; secondary oocyte; endothelial cell; middle temporal gyrus; visceral pleura; tibia; pars reticulata; parietal pleura; entorhinal cortex / Top expressed in: interventricular septum; ventromedial nucleus; morula; lateral septal nucleus; visual cortex; primary oocyte; mammillary body; gastrula; median eminence; vestibular membrane of cochlear duct; More reference expression data
BioGPS	More reference expression data
Gene ontology
Molecular function	guanyl-nucleotide exchange factor activity; GTPase activator activity; protein binding
Cellular component	cytoplasm; Golgi apparatus; lipid droplet; endoplasmic reticulum tubular network; extracellular exosome; endoplasmic reticulum membrane; postsynapse; cytosol; protein-containing complex
Biological process	positive regulation of autophagosome assembly; lipid droplet organization; regulation of GTPase activity; positive regulation of protein lipidation; brain development; positive regulation of gene expression; positive regulation of endoplasmic reticulum tubular network organization; hypothalamus development; establishment of protein localization to endoplasmic reticulum membrane; camera-type eye development; face morphogenesis; positive regulation of GTPase activity; positive regulation of glutamate neurotransmitter secretion in response to membrane depolarization; excitatory postsynaptic potential; regulation of short-term neuronal synaptic plasticity; regulation of calcium ion-dependent exocytosis of neurotransmitter
Sources:Amigo / QuickGO
Orthologs
Databases	NCBI: entry; OMA: entry
Species	Human	Mouse
Entrez	22930	226407
Ensembl	ENSG00000115839	ENSMUSG00000036104
UniProt	Q15042	Q80UJ7
RefSeq (mRNA)	NM_001172435; NM_012233	NM_178690
RefSeq (protein)	NP_001165906; NP_036365	NP_848805; NP_001389242
Location (UCSC)	Chr 2: 135.05 – 135.18 Mb	Chr 1: 127.8 – 127.87 Mb
PubMed search
- Wikidata
View/Edit Human	View/Edit Mouse

Rab3 GTPase-activating protein catalytic subunit is an enzyme that in humans is encoded by the RAB3GAP1 gene.

== Function ==
Members of the RAB3 protein family (see RAB3A; MIM 179490) are implicated in regulated exocytosis of neurotransmitters and hormones. RAB3GAP, which is involved in regulation of RAB3 activity, is a heterodimeric complex consisting a 130-kD catalytic subunit and a 150-kD noncatalytic subunit (MIM 609275). RAB3GAP specifically converts active RAB3-GTP to the inactive form RAB3-GDP (Aligianis et al., 2005).[supplied by OMIM] RAB3GAP is reported to modulate basal and rapamycin-induced autophagy in human fibroblasts and C. elegans. Further, the RAB3GAP1 knockdown has shown to affect the autophagy and mineralization potential of human primary osteoblasts.

== See also ==
- Warburg Micro syndrome
- RAB3GAP2 - the 150-kD noncatalytic subunit of RAB3GAP complex
- Tbc domain
