= Atlastin =

Class of endoplasmic reticulum GTPases

Atlastins (ATLs) are a class of endoplasmic reticulum (ER) GTPases. Invertebrates have a single ATL, while vertebrates possess three ATL proteins (ATL1-3) that are differentially expressed. ATL1 is the predominant paralog of the central nervous system, whereas ATL2 and ATL3 are mainly expressed in tissues outside of the CNS. Loss of all ATLs in mammalian cells dramatically impacts ER structure, including a reduction in tubule three-way junctions.

== Function and Regulation ==
ATLs maintain the ER tubular network via homotypic fusion. ATLs have a conserved domain structure consisting of a globular G domain, a three-helix bundle, two transmembrane domains, and an amphipathic helix. The ATL fusion cycle consists of two ATL monomers in opposing membranes binding GTP, which induces trans G domain dimerization and a crossing over of the three-helix bundle. Crossover and subsequent insertion of the amphipathic helix into the lipid bilayer triggers lipids to mix for fusion. Lastly, GTP is hydrolyzed driving the dimer to disassembly and resetting the fusion machinery.

While most of the human ATL protein structure is conserved between paralogs, the proteins have non-conserved N- and C-termini with the C-termini of ATL1 and ATL2 being autoinhibitory. ATL1 has been shown to interact with a range of proteins including spastin and REEP1, with spastin enhancing ATL1 fusion activity in vitro. ATL1 and ATL2 have also been observed as interacting with ER protein TMCC3, and ATL3 with nonstructural viral proteins, however it is not currently known how these interactions modulate protein function.

== ATLs and Disease ==
Mutations in ATLs are linked to human disease. Mutations in ATL3 are associated with hereditary sensory neuropathy (HSN), and mutations in ATL1 are linked to HSN and hereditary spastic paraplegia (HSP). Research has identified a number of mutations that correspond to the disease phenotype, including the ATL3 Y192C disease mutation that is equivalent to the Y196C mutation in ATL1. Work to identify disease mutants remains ongoing, with a novel nonsense ATL3 mutation being identified in early 2023. ATL3 HSN mutations affect the protein's fusion cycle by causing aberrant tethering. Similarly, an ATL1 HSP mutation was shown to increase tethering but not impact GTPase activity.
