= Warburg Micro syndrome =

- Other names: A complex Hereditary Spastic Paraplegia, RAB 18 Deficiency
- Symptoms: congenital cataract, progressive spasticity, intellectual or developmental disability, weak core, nonverbal or limited speech, small head, small eyes, optic atrophy, and hypogenitalism
- Usual onset: cataracts appear at birth, delayed milestones evident by 4-6 months
- Diagnostic method: symptom based, genetic testing
- Treatment: Supportive care
- Frequency: 144 cases reported in literature

Warburg Micro syndrome (WARBM), a complex hereditary spastic paraplegia or RAB18 deficiency, is a rare autosomal recessive genetic disorder characterized by congenital cataract, hypotonia, spastic diplegia, intellectual or developmental disability, microcephaly, microcornea, optic atrophy, and hypogenitalism.

== Genetics ==
Warburg Micro is autosomal recessive, which means two copies of an abnormal gene must be present for the disorder to appear. Warburg Micro is caused by mutations in any of the following genes: RAB18, RAB3GAP1, RAB3GAP2 and TBC1D20

== Diagnosis ==
Warburg Micro syndrome is diagnosed by genetic testing. It should be suspected when cataracts are present at birth and developmental delays are noted.

== Treatment ==
There is no specific treatment for Warburg Micro syndrome, but there are ways to help the symptoms that come with it. Congenital cataracts are removed surgically. Physical and occupational therapy should begin as soon as possible. Medication can treat seizures, spasticity, and digestive issues. Orthotics like braces and assistive devices like standers and wheel chairs can improve bone health, spasticity, and mobility. Specialists can perform surgeries to address hip and spine health.
