= ZFR =

Protein-coding gene in humans

Identifiers
- Aliases: ZFR, SPG71, ZFR1, zinc finger RNA binding protein
- External IDs: OMIM: 615635; MGI: 1341890; GeneCards: ZFR

Gene location (Human)
Chr.	Chromosome 5 (human)
Band	5p13.3	Start	32,354,350 bp
Band	5p13.3	End	32,444,740 bp

Gene location (Mouse)
Chr.	Chromosome 15 (mouse)
Band	15|15 A1	Start	12,117,917 bp
Band	15|15 A1	End	12,185,769 bp
RNA expression pattern
Bgee	Human / Mouse (ortholog); Top expressed in: Region I of hippocampus proper; germinal epithelium; dorsal motor nucleus of vagus nerve; endothelial cell; Brodmann area 23; ventricular zone; tibia; middle frontal gyrus; parotid gland; postcentral gyrus / Top expressed in: dorsomedial hypothalamic nucleus; nucleus accumbens; cingulate gyrus; olfactory tubercle; ventral tegmental area; habenula; median eminence; lateral septal nucleus; subiculum; piriform cortex; More reference expression data
BioGPS	n/a
Gene ontology
Molecular function	DNA binding; protein binding; nucleic acid binding; zinc ion binding; RNA binding; double-stranded RNA binding; single-stranded RNA binding
Cellular component	chromosome; cytoplasm; nucleus
Biological process	multicellular organism development
Sources:Amigo / QuickGO
Orthologs
Databases	NCBI: entry; OMA: entry
Species	Human	Mouse
Entrez	51663	22763
Ensembl	ENSG00000056097	ENSMUSG00000022201
UniProt	Q96KR1	O88532
RefSeq (mRNA)	NM_016107	NM_011767; NM_001358823
RefSeq (protein)	NP_057191	NP_035897; NP_001345752
Location (UCSC)	Chr 5: 32.35 – 32.44 Mb	Chr 15: 12.12 – 12.19 Mb
PubMed search
- Wikidata
View/Edit Human	View/Edit Mouse

Zinc finger RNA binding protein is a protein in humans that is encoded by the ZFR gene.

== Function ==
This gene encodes an RNA-binding protein characterized by its DZF (domain associated with zinc fingers) domain. The encoded protein may play a role in the nucleocytoplasmic shuttling of another RNA-binding protein, Staufen homolog 2, in neurons. Expression of this gene is regulated through alternative polyadenylation that mediates differential microRNA targeting. Elevated expression of this gene has been observed in human patients with pancreatic cancer and knockdown of this gene may result in reduced viability and invasion of pancreatic cancer cells.
