= AP4B1 =

Protein-coding gene in humans

Identifiers
- Aliases: AP4B1, BETA-4, CPSQ5, SPG47, adaptor related protein complex 4 beta 1 subunit, adaptor related protein complex 4 subunit beta 1
- External IDs: OMIM: 607245; MGI: 1337130; GeneCards: AP4B1
Available structures
PDB	Ortholog search: PDBe RCSB
PDB	List of PDB id codes 2MJ7

Gene location (Human)
Chr.	Chromosome 1 (human)
Band	1p13.2	Start	113,894,194 bp
Band	1p13.2	End	113,905,201 bp

Gene location (Mouse)
Chr.	Chromosome 3 (mouse)
Band	3|3 F2.2	Start	103,716,836 bp
Band	3|3 F2.2	End	103,729,341 bp
RNA expression pattern
Bgee	Human / Mouse (ortholog); Top expressed in: granulocyte; cerebellar hemisphere; right hemisphere of cerebellum; thymus; rectum; spleen; body of pancreas; mucosa of ileum; right uterine tube; pancreatic epithelial cell / Top expressed in: spermatocyte; spermatid; bone marrow; granulocyte; testicle; proximal tubule; ganglionic eminence; liver; right kidney; quadriceps femoris muscle; More reference expression data
BioGPS	n/a
Gene ontology
Molecular function	protein binding; clathrin binding
Cellular component	membrane coat; Golgi apparatus; trans-Golgi network membrane; endosome lumen; membrane; clathrin adaptor complex; trans-Golgi network; cytosol; extrinsic component of membrane; AP-4 adaptor complex
Biological process	protein transport; intracellular protein transport; vesicle-mediated transport; protein targeting; protein localization
Sources:Amigo / QuickGO
Orthologs
Databases	NCBI: entry; OMA: entry
Species	Human	Mouse
Entrez	10717	67489
Ensembl	ENSG00000134262	ENSMUSG00000032952
UniProt	Q9Y6B7	Q9WV76
RefSeq (mRNA)	NM_001253852; NM_001253853; NM_001308312; NM_006594	NM_001163552; NM_001163553; NM_026193
RefSeq (protein)	NP_001240781; NP_001240782; NP_001295241; NP_006585	NP_001157024; NP_001157025; NP_080469
Location (UCSC)	Chr 1: 113.89 – 113.91 Mb	Chr 3: 103.72 – 103.73 Mb
PubMed search
- Wikidata
View/Edit Human	View/Edit Mouse

AP-4 complex subunit beta-1 is a protein that in humans is encoded by the AP4B1 gene.

== Function ==
The heterotetrameric adaptor protein (AP) complexes sort integral membrane proteins at various stages of the endocytic and secretory pathways. AP4 is composed of 2 large chains, beta-4 (AP4B1, this protein) and epsilon-4 (AP4E1), a medium chain, mu-4 (AP4M1), and a small chain, sigma-4 (AP4S1)

== Interactions ==
AP4B1 has been shown to interact with AP4M1.

== Clinical relevance ==
AP4-complex-mediated trafficking plays a crucial role in brain development and functioning.
