= PGAP1 =

Protein-coding gene in the species Homo sapiens

Identifiers
- Aliases: PGAP1, Bst1, ISPD3024, MRT42, SPG67, post-GPI attachment to proteins 1, post-GPI attachment to proteins inositol deacylase 1, NEDDSBA
- External IDs: OMIM: 611655; MGI: 2443342; HomoloGene: 41605; GeneCards: PGAP1; OMA:PGAP1 - orthologs

Gene location (Human)
Chr.	Chromosome 2 (human)
Band	2q33.1	Start	196,833,004 bp
Band	2q33.1	End	196,927,796 bp

Gene location (Mouse)
Chr.	Chromosome 1 (mouse)
Band	1|1 C1.2	Start	54,512,153 bp
Band	1|1 C1.2	End	54,596,843 bp
RNA expression pattern
Bgee	Human / Mouse (ortholog); Top expressed in: endothelial cell; ganglionic eminence; skin of thigh; ventricular zone; buccal mucosa cell; Brodmann area 23; sural nerve; skin of hip; sperm; Epithelium of choroid plexus / Top expressed in: epithelium of small intestine; ventromedial nucleus; lateral septal nucleus; dorsomedial hypothalamic nucleus; paraventricular nucleus of hypothalamus; lateral hypothalamus; anterior amygdaloid area; transitional epithelium of urinary bladder; mammillary body; ventral tegmental area; More reference expression data
BioGPS	n/a
Gene ontology
Molecular function	nuclease activity; phosphoric ester hydrolase activity; hydrolase activity; hydrolase activity, acting on ester bonds; phosphatidylinositol deacylase activity
Cellular component	integral component of membrane; endoplasmic reticulum membrane; membrane; endoplasmic reticulum
Biological process	embryonic pattern specification; nucleic acid phosphodiester bond hydrolysis; head development; attachment of GPI anchor to protein; hearing; forebrain regionalization; protein transport; GPI anchor biosynthetic process; myo-inositol transport; anterior/posterior axis specification; GPI anchor metabolic process; endoplasmic reticulum to Golgi vesicle-mediated transport
Sources:Amigo / QuickGO
Orthologs
Species	Human	Mouse
Entrez	80055	241062
Ensembl	ENSG00000197121	ENSMUSG00000073678
UniProt	Q75T13	Q3UUQ7
RefSeq (mRNA)	NM_024989; NM_001321099; NM_001321100	NM_001163314; NM_175508
RefSeq (protein)	NP_001308028; NP_001308029; NP_079265	NP_001156786
Location (UCSC)	Chr 2: 196.83 – 196.93 Mb	Chr 1: 54.51 – 54.6 Mb
PubMed search
- Wikidata
View/Edit Human	View/Edit Mouse

Post-GPI attachment to proteins 1 is a protein that in humans is encoded by the PGAP1 gene.

== Function ==
The protein encoded by this gene functions early in the glycosylphosphatidylinositol (GPI) biosynthetic pathway, catalyzing the inositol deacylation of GPI. The encoded protein is required for the production of GPI that can attach to proteins, and this may be an important factor in the transport of GPI-anchored proteins from the endoplasmic reticulum to the Golgi. Defects in this gene are a cause of intellectual disability, autosomal recessive 42.
