= B4GALNT1 =

Protein-coding gene in humans

Identifiers
- Aliases: B4GALNT1, GALGT, GALNACT, GalNAc-T, SPG26, beta-1,4-N-acetyl-galactosaminyltransferase 1
- External IDs: OMIM: 601873; MGI: 1342057; GeneCards: B4GALNT1
Enzyme activity
EC #	BRENDA	ExPASy	KEGG	MetaCyc
2.4.1.92	↗	↗	↗	↗

Gene location (Human)
Chr.	Chromosome 12 (human)
Band	12q13.3	Start	57,623,409 bp
Band	12q13.3	End	57,633,239 bp

Gene location (Mouse)
Chr.	Chromosome 10 (mouse)
Band	10 D3|10 74.5 cM	Start	127,001,094 bp
Band	10 D3|10 74.5 cM	End	127,008,199 bp
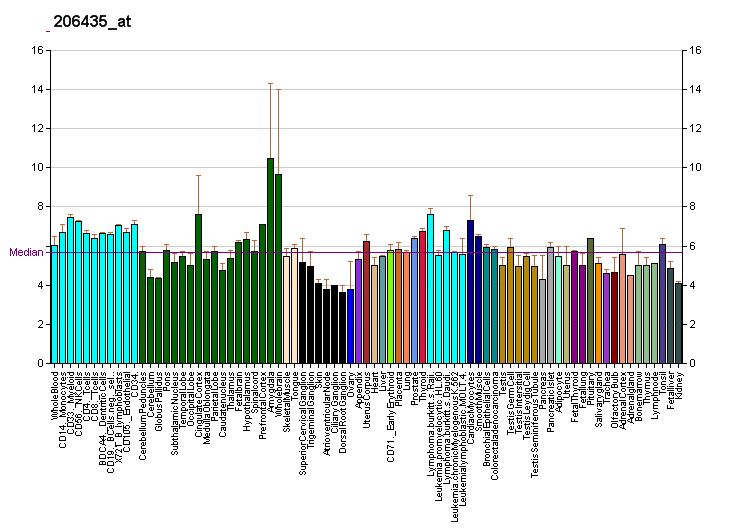
RNA expression pattern
Bgee	Human / Mouse (ortholog); Top expressed in: right hemisphere of cerebellum; right frontal lobe; prefrontal cortex; Brodmann area 9; ganglionic eminence; cingulate gyrus; anterior cingulate cortex; nucleus accumbens; caudate nucleus; putamen / Top expressed in: crypt of lieberkuhn of small intestine; duodenum; epithelium of stomach; pyloric antrum; jejunum; superior frontal gyrus; mesenteric lymph nodes; primary visual cortex; granulocyte; parotid gland; More reference expression data
BioGPS	More reference expression data
Gene ontology
Molecular function	hexosyltransferase activity; glycosyltransferase activity; acetylgalactosaminyltransferase activity; transferase activity; (N-acetylneuraminyl)-galactosylglucosylceramide N-acetylgalactosaminyltransferase activity
Cellular component	Golgi apparatus; plasma membrane; membrane; integral component of Golgi membrane; integral component of membrane; Golgi membrane
Biological process	glycosphingolipid metabolic process; spermatogenesis; lipid glycosylation; lipid storage; ganglioside biosynthetic process; lipid metabolism; sphingolipid metabolic process; carbohydrate metabolic process
Sources:Amigo / QuickGO
Orthologs
Databases	NCBI: entry; OMA: entry
Species	Human	Mouse
Entrez	2583	14421
Ensembl	ENSG00000135454	ENSMUSG00000006731
UniProt	Q00973	Q09200
RefSeq (mRNA)	NM_001276468; NM_001276469; NM_001478	NM_001244617; NM_001244618; NM_008080; NM_027739; NM_001358577 NM_001358578
RefSeq (protein)	NP_001263397; NP_001263398; NP_001469	NP_001231546; NP_001231547; NP_032106; NP_082015; NP_001345506 NP_001345507
Location (UCSC)	Chr 12: 57.62 – 57.63 Mb	Chr 10: 127 – 127.01 Mb
PubMed search
- Wikidata
View/Edit Human	View/Edit Mouse

Beta-1,4 N-acetylgalactosaminyltransferase 1 is an enzyme that in humans is encoded by the B4GALNT1 gene.

GM2 and GD2 gangliosides are sialic acid-containing glycosphingolipids. GalNAc-T is the enzyme involved in the biosynthesis of G(M2) and G(D2) glycosphingolipids. GalNAc-T catalyzes the transfer of GalNAc into G(M3) and G(D3) by a beta-1,4 linkage, resulting in the synthesis of G(M2) and G(D2), respectively.
