= Atlastin-1 =

Protein-coding gene in the species Homo sapiens

ATL1

Identifiers
- Aliases: ATL1, AD-FSP, FSP1, GBP3, HSN1D, SPG3, SPG3A, atlastin1, Atlastin, atlastin GTPase 1
- External IDs: OMIM: 606439; MGI: 1921241; GeneCards: ATL1
Available structures
PDB	Ortholog search: PDBe RCSB
PDB	List of PDB id codes 3Q5D, 3Q5E, 3QNU, 3QOF, 4IDN, 4IDO, 4IDP, 4IDQ

Gene location (Human)
Chr.	Chromosome 14 (human)
Band	14q22.1	Start	50,532,509 bp
Band	14q22.1	End	50,634,017 bp

Gene location (Mouse)
Chr.	Chromosome 12 (mouse)
Band	12|12 C2	Start	69,939,388 bp
Band	12|12 C2	End	70,013,191 bp
RNA expression pattern
Bgee	Human / Mouse (ortholog); Top expressed in: middle temporal gyrus; Brodmann area 23; endothelial cell; lateral nuclear group of thalamus; spinal ganglia; Brodmann area 46; pars compacta; pons; superior frontal gyrus; entorhinal cortex / Top expressed in: dorsomedial hypothalamic nucleus; piriform cortex; primary motor cortex; ventral tegmental area; anterior amygdaloid area; ventromedial nucleus; prefrontal cortex; lateral hypothalamus; cingulate gyrus; subiculum; More reference expression data
BioGPS	n/a
Gene ontology
Molecular function	nucleotide binding; GTP binding; protein binding; hydrolase activity; GTPase activity; identical protein binding
Cellular component	cytoplasm; integral component of membrane; axon; Golgi membrane; Golgi apparatus; cell projection; endoplasmic reticulum membrane; endoplasmic reticulum; membrane; Golgi cis cisterna; endoplasmic reticulum tubular network; endoplasmic reticulum tubular network membrane
Biological process	protein homooligomerization; axonogenesis; endoplasmic reticulum organization; endoplasmic reticulum tubular network membrane organization; metabolism
Sources:Amigo / QuickGO
Orthologs
Databases	NCBI: entry; OMA: entry
Species	Human	Mouse
Entrez	51062	73991
Ensembl	ENSG00000198513	ENSMUSG00000021066
UniProt	Q8WXF7	Q8BH66
RefSeq (mRNA)	NM_181598; NM_001127713; NM_015915	NM_178628
RefSeq (protein)	NP_001121185; NP_056999; NP_853629	NP_848743
Location (UCSC)	Chr 14: 50.53 – 50.63 Mb	Chr 12: 69.94 – 70.01 Mb
PubMed search
- Wikidata
View/Edit Human	View/Edit Mouse

Atlastin-1, is a protein that in humans is encoded by the ATL1 gene. It is part of the atlastin family of GTPases.
