= ZFYVE26 =

Protein-coding gene in the species Homo sapiens

Identifiers
- Aliases: ZFYVE26, FYVE-CENT, SPG15, zinc finger FYVE-type containing 26
- External IDs: OMIM: 612012; MGI: 1924767; GeneCards: ZFYVE26

Gene location (Human)
Chr.	Chromosome 14 (human)
Band	14q24.1	Start	67,727,374 bp
Band	14q24.1	End	67,816,590 bp

Gene location (Mouse)
Chr.	Chromosome 12 (mouse)
Band	12|12 C3	Start	79,279,120 bp
Band	12|12 C3	End	79,343,078 bp
RNA expression pattern
Bgee	Human / Mouse (ortholog); Top expressed in: sural nerve; endothelial cell; visceral pleura; Skeletal muscle tissue of biceps brachii; internal globus pallidus; tendon of biceps brachii; muscle of thigh; epithelium of colon; stromal cell of endometrium; ventricular zone / Top expressed in: granulocyte; zygote; genital tubercle; epithelium of small intestine; neural layer of retina; blastocyst; left lobe of liver; tail of embryo; spermatocyte; superior frontal gyrus; More reference expression data
BioGPS	n/a
Gene ontology
Molecular function	protein binding; metal ion binding; lipid binding; phosphatidylinositol-3-phosphate binding
Cellular component	cytoplasm; lysosomal membrane; centrosome; cytoskeleton; microtubule organizing center; midbody
Biological process	cell division; cell cycle; cytokinesis; double-strand break repair via homologous recombination; DNA repair; cellular response to DNA damage stimulus; mitotic cytokinesis; regulation of cytokinesis
Sources:Amigo / QuickGO
Orthologs
Databases	NCBI: entry; OMA: entry
Species	Human	Mouse
Entrez	23503	211978
Ensembl	ENSG00000072121	ENSMUSG00000066440
UniProt	Q68DK2	Q5DU37
RefSeq (mRNA)	NM_015346	NM_001008550
RefSeq (protein)	NP_056161	NP_001008550
Location (UCSC)	Chr 14: 67.73 – 67.82 Mb	Chr 12: 79.28 – 79.34 Mb
PubMed search
- Wikidata
View/Edit Human	View/Edit Mouse

Zinc finger, FYVE domain containing 26 is a protein that in humans is encoded by the ZFYVE26 gene.

== Function ==
This gene encodes a protein which contains a FYVE zinc finger binding domain. The presence of this domain is thought to target these proteins to membrane lipids through interaction with phospholipids in the membrane. Mutations in this gene are associated with autosomal recessive spastic paraplegia-15.
