= NIPA1 =

Protein-coding gene in humans

Identifiers
- Aliases: NIPA1, FSP3, SPG6, non imprinted in Prader-Willi/Angelman syndrome 1, SLC57A1, NIPA magnesium transporter 1
- External IDs: OMIM: 608145; MGI: 2442058; GeneCards: NIPA1

Gene location (Human)
Chr.	Chromosome 15 (human)
Band	15q11.2	Start	22,773,063 bp
Band	15q11.2	End	22,829,789 bp

Gene location (Mouse)
Chr.	Chromosome 7 (mouse)
Band	7|7 B5	Start	55,627,315 bp
Band	7|7 B5	End	55,669,702 bp
RNA expression pattern
Bgee	Human / Mouse (ortholog); Top expressed in: internal globus pallidus; C1 segment; lateral nuclear group of thalamus; postcentral gyrus; subthalamic nucleus; inferior ganglion of vagus nerve; Brodmann area 46; pars reticulata; pars compacta; external globus pallidus / Top expressed in: deep cerebellar nuclei; piriform cortex; globus pallidus; ventral tegmental area; pontine nuclei; lateral geniculate nucleus; suprachiasmatic nucleus; sciatic nerve; substantia nigra; trigeminal ganglion; More reference expression data
BioGPS	n/a
Gene ontology
Molecular function	magnesium ion transmembrane transporter activity
Cellular component	integral component of membrane; endosome; plasma membrane; early endosome; membrane
Biological process	magnesium ion transmembrane transport; ion transport; transmembrane transport; magnesium ion transport
Sources:Amigo / QuickGO
Orthologs
Databases	NCBI: entry; OMA: entry
Species	Human	Mouse
Entrez	123606	233280
Ensembl	ENSG00000170113; ENSG00000288478	ENSMUSG00000047037
UniProt	Q7RTP0; Q8TAY1	Q8BHK1
RefSeq (mRNA)	NM_144599; NM_001142275	NM_153578
RefSeq (protein)	NP_001135747; NP_653200; NP_001135747.1	NP_705806
Location (UCSC)	Chr 15: 22.77 – 22.83 Mb	Chr 7: 55.63 – 55.67 Mb
PubMed search
- Wikidata
View/Edit Human	View/Edit Mouse

Non-imprinted in Prader-Willi/Angelman syndrome region protein 1 is a protein that in humans is encoded by the NIPA1 gene. This gene encodes a potential transmembrane protein which functions either as a receptor or transporter molecule, possibly as a magnesium transporter. This protein is thought to play a role in nervous system development and maintenance. Alternative splice variants have been described, but their biological nature has not been determined. Mutations in this gene have been associated with the human genetic disease autosomal dominant spastic paraplegia 6.
