= AP4M1 =

Protein-coding gene in the species Homo sapiens

Identifiers
- Aliases: AP4M1, CPSQ3, MU-4, MU-ARP2, SPG50, adaptor related protein complex 4 mu 1 subunit, adaptor related protein complex 4 subunit mu 1
- External IDs: OMIM: 602296; MGI: 1337063; GeneCards: AP4M1
Available structures
PDB	Ortholog search: PDBe RCSB
PDB	List of PDB id codes 3L81, 4MDR

Gene location (Human)
Chr.	Chromosome 7 (human)
Band	7q22.1	Start	100,101,549 bp
Band	7q22.1	End	100,110,345 bp

Gene location (Mouse)
Chr.	Chromosome 5 (mouse)
Band	5|5 G2	Start	138,170,264 bp
Band	5|5 G2	End	138,178,691 bp
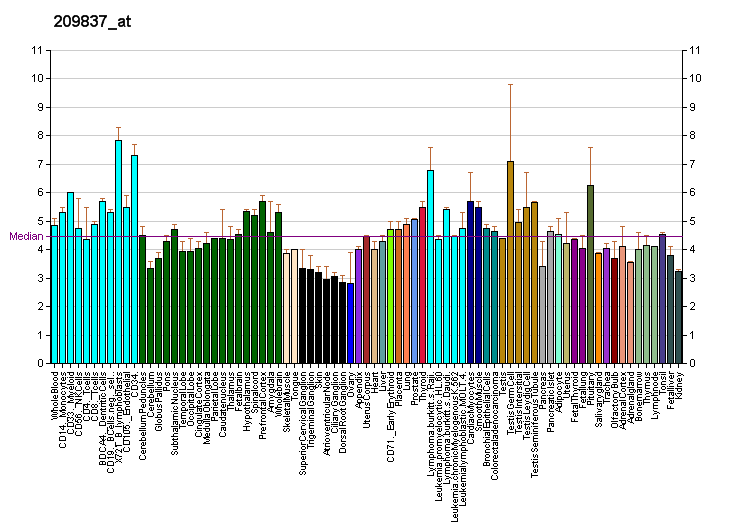
RNA expression pattern
Bgee	Human / Mouse (ortholog); Top expressed in: left testis; right testis; right uterine tube; anterior pituitary; stromal cell of endometrium; body of uterus; muscle layer of sigmoid colon; right lobe of thyroid gland; ganglionic eminence; Descending thoracic aorta / Top expressed in: spermatid; spermatocyte; ventricular zone; genital tubercle; lip; yolk sac; tail of embryo; neural layer of retina; seminiferous tubule; muscle of thigh; More reference expression data
BioGPS	More reference expression data
Gene ontology
Molecular function	protein binding; protein domain specific binding
Cellular component	trans-Golgi network; endosome; Golgi apparatus; trans-Golgi network membrane; endosome lumen; extracellular exosome; clathrin adaptor complex; cytosol; early endosome; AP-4 adaptor complex; membrane
Biological process	Golgi to endosome transport; protein transport; intracellular protein transport; transport; protein targeting; protein targeting to lysosome; vesicle-mediated transport; Golgi to lysosome transport; protein localization to basolateral plasma membrane; protein localization
Sources:Amigo / QuickGO
Orthologs
Databases	NCBI: entry; OMA: entry
Species	Human	Mouse
Entrez	9179	11781
Ensembl	ENSG00000221838	ENSMUSG00000019518
UniProt	O00189	Q9JKC7
RefSeq (mRNA)	NM_004722; NM_001363671	NM_021392
RefSeq (protein)	NP_004713; NP_001350600	NP_067367
Location (UCSC)	Chr 7: 100.1 – 100.11 Mb	Chr 5: 138.17 – 138.18 Mb
PubMed search
- Wikidata
View/Edit Human	View/Edit Mouse

AP-4 complex subunit mu-1 is a protein that in humans is encoded by the AP4M1 gene.

== Function ==
This gene encodes a subunit of the heterotetrameric AP-4 complex. The encoded protein belongs to the adaptor complexes medium subunits family. This AP-4 complex is involved in the recognition and sorting of cargo proteins with tyrosine-based motifs from the trans-golgi network to the endosomal-lysosomal system.

== Interactions ==
AP4M1 has been shown to interact with AP4B1.

== Clinical relevance ==
The AP4-complex-mediated trafficking plays a crucial role in brain development and functioning. Mutations of the gene cause spastic paraplegia 50, one of the many subtypes of spastic paraplegia.
