= ERLIN2 =

Protein-coding gene in the species Homo sapiens

Identifiers
- Aliases: ERLIN2, C8orf2, Erlin-2, NET32, SPFH2, SPG18, ER lipid raft associated 2
- External IDs: OMIM: 611605; MGI: 2387215; GeneCards: ERLIN2

Gene location (Human)
Chr.	Chromosome 8 (human)
Band	8p11.23	Start	37,736,601 bp
Band	8p11.23	End	37,758,422 bp

Gene location (Mouse)
Chr.	Chromosome 8 (mouse)
Band	8|8 A2	Start	27,513,289 bp
Band	8|8 A2	End	27,530,356 bp
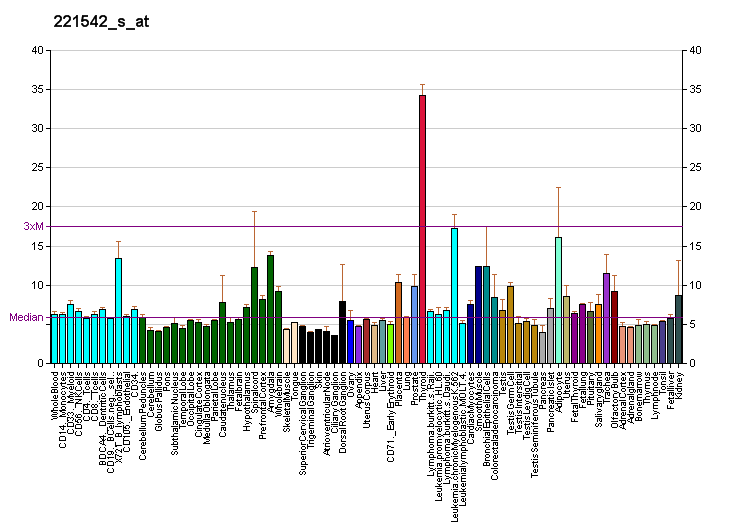

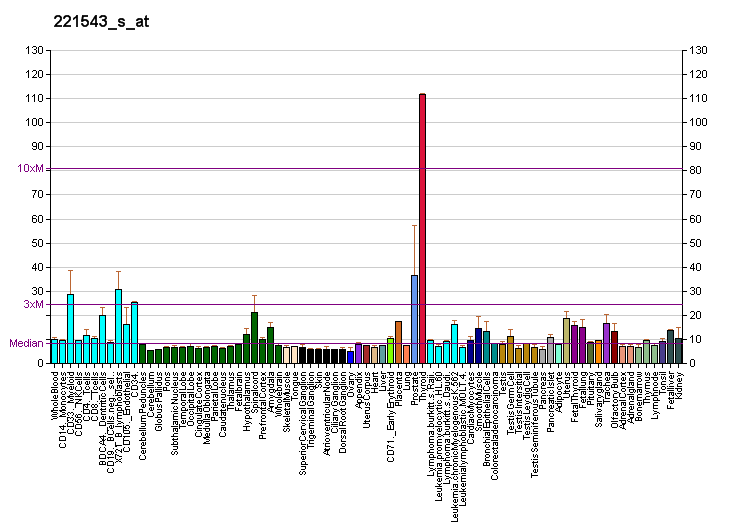
RNA expression pattern
Bgee	Human / Mouse (ortholog); Top expressed in: Epithelium of choroid plexus; renal medulla; Achilles tendon; islet of Langerhans; parotid gland; germinal epithelium; mucosa of paranasal sinus; bronchial epithelial cell; kidney tubule; caput epididymis / Top expressed in: spermatocyte; otolith organ; utricle; Epithelium of choroid plexus; right kidney; vestibular membrane of cochlear duct; decidua; superior cervical ganglion; gastrula; proximal tubule; More reference expression data
BioGPS	More reference expression data
Gene ontology
Molecular function	cholesterol binding; protein binding; protein tyrosine kinase activity; ubiquitin protein ligase binding
Cellular component	integral component of membrane; membrane raft; membrane; endoplasmic reticulum; plasma membrane; endoplasmic reticulum membrane; cytosol; protein-containing complex
Biological process	SREBP signaling pathway; steroid metabolic process; cholesterol metabolic process; negative regulation of cholesterol biosynthetic process; negative regulation of fatty acid biosynthetic process; lipid metabolism; ubiquitin-dependent ERAD pathway; peptidyl-tyrosine phosphorylation; transmembrane transport
Sources:Amigo / QuickGO
Orthologs
Databases	NCBI: entry; OMA: entry
Species	Human	Mouse
Entrez	11160	244373
Ensembl	ENSG00000147475	ENSMUSG00000031483
UniProt	O94905	Q8BFZ9
RefSeq (mRNA)	NM_001003790; NM_001003791; NM_007175; NM_001362878; NM_001362880	NM_153592; NM_001364476; NM_001364477; NM_001379175; NM_001379176 NM_001379177; NM_001379178
RefSeq (protein)	NP_001003790; NP_001003791; NP_009106; NP_001349807; NP_001349809	NP_705820; NP_001351405; NP_001351406; NP_001366104; NP_001366105 NP_001366106; NP_001366107; NP_001391043; NP_001391044; NP_001391045
Location (UCSC)	Chr 8: 37.74 – 37.76 Mb	Chr 8: 27.51 – 27.53 Mb
PubMed search
- Wikidata
View/Edit Human	View/Edit Mouse

Erlin-2 is a protein that in humans is encoded by the ERLIN2 gene.
