= REEP1 =

Protein-coding gene in the species Homo sapiens

Identifiers
- Aliases: REEP1, C2orf23, HMN5B, SPG31, Yip2a, receptor accessory protein 1
- External IDs: OMIM: 609139; MGI: 1098827; HomoloGene: 41504; GeneCards: REEP1; OMA:REEP1 - orthologs

Gene location (Human)
Chr.	Chromosome 2 (human)
Band	2p11.2	Start	86,213,993 bp
Band	2p11.2	End	86,338,083 bp

Gene location (Mouse)
Chr.	Chromosome 6 (mouse)
Band	6 C1|6 32.2 cM	Start	71,684,545 bp
Band	6 C1|6 32.2 cM	End	71,787,694 bp
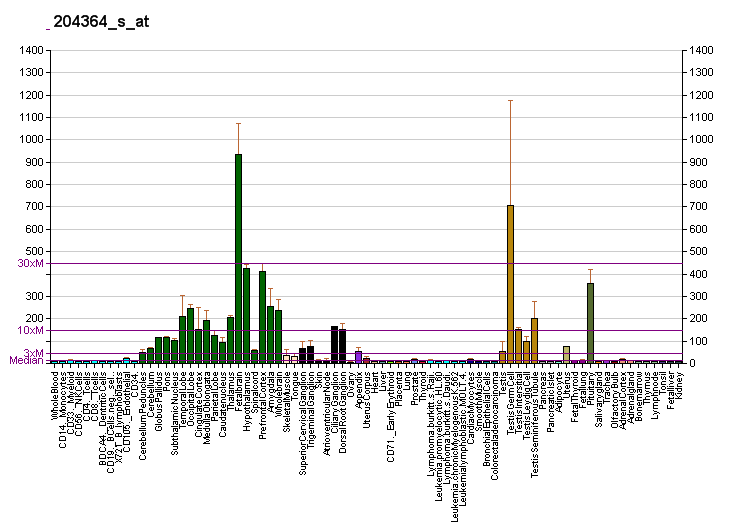

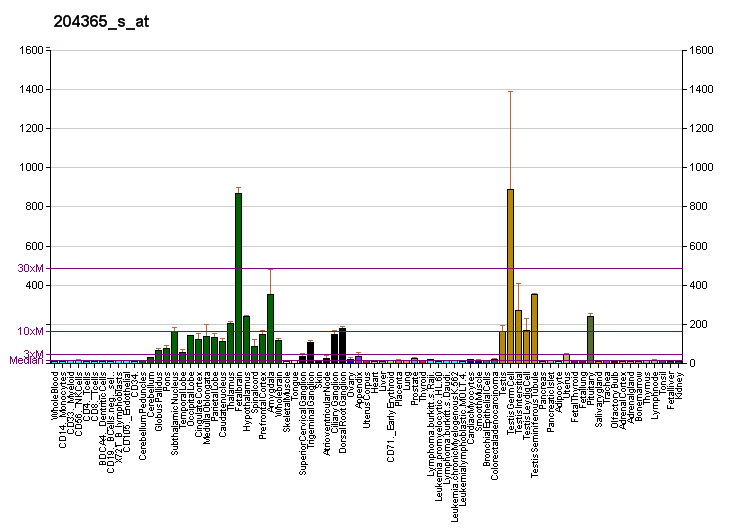
RNA expression pattern
Bgee	Human / Mouse (ortholog); Top expressed in: spinal ganglia; middle temporal gyrus; pars compacta; tail of epididymis; pons; superior vestibular nucleus; pars reticulata; orbitofrontal cortex; lateral nuclear group of thalamus; germinal epithelium / Top expressed in: medial dorsal nucleus; medulla oblongata; medial vestibular nucleus; central gray substance of midbrain; extensor digitorum longus muscle; ventral tegmental area; pons; facial motor nucleus; deep cerebellar nuclei; medial geniculate nucleus; More reference expression data
BioGPS	More reference expression data
Gene ontology
Molecular function	microtubule binding; protein binding; olfactory receptor binding
Cellular component	cytoplasm; integral component of membrane; endoplasmic reticulum; membrane; mitochondrial membranes; mitochondrion; endoplasmic reticulum membrane; endoplasmic reticulum tubular network
Biological process	endoplasmic reticulum tubular network organization; protein insertion into membrane; regulation of intracellular transport
Sources:Amigo / QuickGO
Orthologs
Species	Human	Mouse
Entrez	65055	52250
Ensembl	ENSG00000068615	ENSMUSG00000052852
UniProt	Q9H902	Q8BGH4
RefSeq (mRNA)	NM_001164730; NM_001164731; NM_001164732; NM_022912; NM_001371279 NM_001371280	NM_178608
RefSeq (protein)	NP_001158202; NP_001158203; NP_001158204; NP_075063; NP_001358208 NP_001358209	NP_848723
Location (UCSC)	Chr 2: 86.21 – 86.34 Mb	Chr 6: 71.68 – 71.79 Mb
PubMed search
- Wikidata
View/Edit Human	View/Edit Mouse

Receptor expression-enhancing protein 1 is a protein that in humans is encoded by the REEP1 gene.

== Clinical significance ==
Mutations in REEP1 are known to cause the following conditions:

- Spastic paraplegia 31, autosomal dominant (SPG31);
- Neuronopathy, distal hereditary motor, 5B (HMN5B);
- Distal spinal muscular atrophy, autosomal recessive, 6 (DSMA6).
