= Phenylalanine–tRNA ligase beta subunit =

Enzyme found in humans

FARSB

Identifiers
- Aliases: FARSB, FARSLB, FRSB, PheHB, PheRS, HSPC173, phenylalanyl-tRNA synthetase beta subunit, phenylalanyl-tRNA synthetase subunit beta, NEDBLLA, RILDBC, RILDBC1
- External IDs: OMIM: 609690; MGI: 1346035; GeneCards: FARSB
Available structures
PDB	Ortholog search: PDBe RCSB
PDB	List of PDB id codes 3L4G
Enzyme activity
EC #	BRENDA	ExPASy	KEGG	MetaCyc
6.1.1.20	↗	↗	↗	↗

Gene location (Human)
Chr.	Chromosome 2 (human)
Band	2q36.1	Start	222,566,899 bp
Band	2q36.1	End	222,656,092 bp

Gene location (Mouse)
Chr.	Chromosome 1 (mouse)
Band	1|1 C4	Start	78,394,612 bp
Band	1|1 C4	End	78,465,534 bp
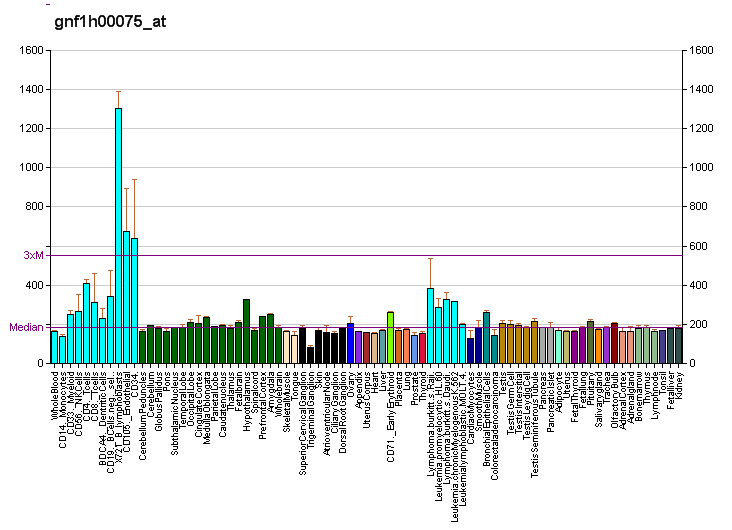
RNA expression pattern
Bgee	Human / Mouse (ortholog); Top expressed in: myocardium of left ventricle; cardiac muscle tissue of right atrium; gingival epithelium; pancreatic epithelial cell; pancreatic ductal cell; skin of arm; middle temporal gyrus; Brodmann area 23; sperm; epithelium of nasopharynx / Top expressed in: primitive streak; tail of embryo; genital tubercle; Paneth cell; condyle; fossa; secondary oocyte; barrel cortex; external carotid artery; zygote; More reference expression data
BioGPS	More reference expression data
Gene ontology
Molecular function	ligase activity; nucleotide binding; aminoacyl-tRNA ligase activity; magnesium ion binding; ATP binding; RNA binding; phenylalanine-tRNA ligase activity; protein binding
Cellular component	membrane; cytosol; cytoplasm; phenylalanine-tRNA ligase complex
Biological process	tRNA aminoacylation for protein translation; protein biosynthesis; protein heterotetramerization; phenylalanyl-tRNA aminoacylation
Sources:Amigo / QuickGO
Orthologs
Databases	NCBI: entry; OMA: entry
Species	Human	Mouse
Entrez	10056	23874
Ensembl	ENSG00000116120	ENSMUSG00000026245
UniProt	Q9NSD9	Q9WUA2
RefSeq (mRNA)	NM_005687	NM_001278075; NM_011811
RefSeq (protein)	NP_005678	NP_001265004; NP_035941
Location (UCSC)	Chr 2: 222.57 – 222.66 Mb	Chr 1: 78.39 – 78.47 Mb
PubMed search
- Wikidata
View/Edit Human	View/Edit Mouse

Phenylalanine–tRNA ligase beta subunit, also called Phenylalanyl-tRNA synthetase beta chain, is an enzyme that in humans is encoded by the FARSB gene.

This gene encodes a highly conserved enzyme that belongs to the aminoacyl-tRNA synthetase class IIc subfamily. This enzyme comprises the regulatory beta subunits that form a tetramer with two catalytic alpha subunits. In the presence of ATP, this tetramer is responsible for attaching L-phenylalanine to the terminal adenosine of the appropriate tRNA. A pseudogene located on chromosome 10 has been identified.

== Medical significance ==
Pathogenic mutations in FARSB are the cause of a disorder called Rajab interstitial lung disease with brain calcifications-1 (RILDBC1), which involves growth defects and lung disease with highly variable severity. In severe cases it can present in infancy and may lead to death.
