= Amyotrophy =

Progressive wasting of muscle tissues

- Specialty: Neurology

Amyotrophy is progressive wasting of muscle tissues. Muscle pain is also a symptom. It can occur in middle-aged males with type 2 diabetes. It also occurs with motor neuron disease.

== Differential diagnosis ==
The following are considered differential diagnosis for amyotrophy:

- compressive and infective causes of polyradiculopathy
- structural disc diseases
- chronic demyelinating neuropathies

== See also ==
- Diabetic amyotrophy
- Monomelic amyotrophy
- Amyotrophic lateral sclerosis
