= RAB3GAP2 =

Protein-coding gene in humans

Identifiers
- Aliases: RAB3GAP2, RAB3-GAP150, RAB3GAP150, SPG69, WARBM2, p150, RAB3 GTPase activating non-catalytic protein subunit 2, MARTS1
- External IDs: OMIM: 609275; MGI: 1916043; GeneCards: RAB3GAP2

Gene location (Human)
| Chr. | Chromosome 1 (human) |
| Band | 1q41 | Start | 220,148,293 bp |
| Band | 1q41 | End | 220,272,529 bp |

Gene location (Mouse)
| Chr. | Chromosome 1 (mouse) |
| Band | 1|1 H5 | Start | 184,936,314 bp |
| Band | 1|1 H5 | End | 185,018,956 bp |
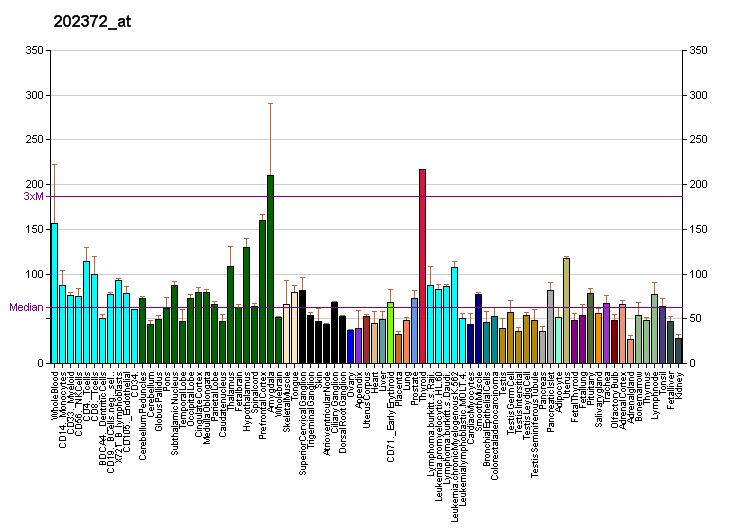

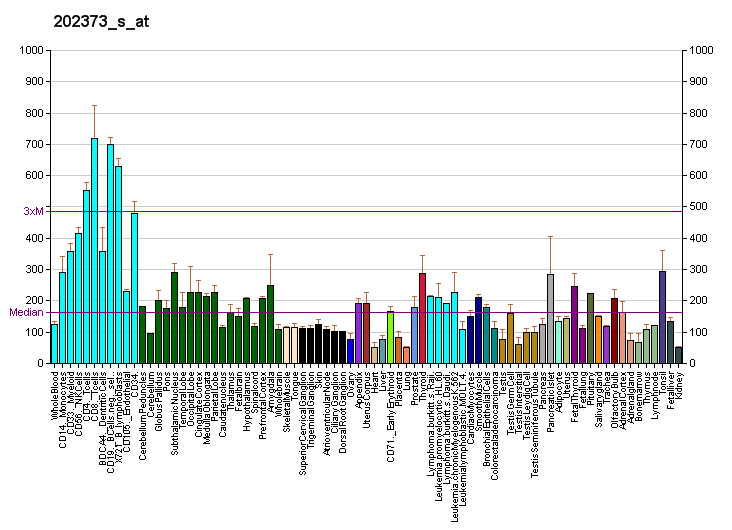

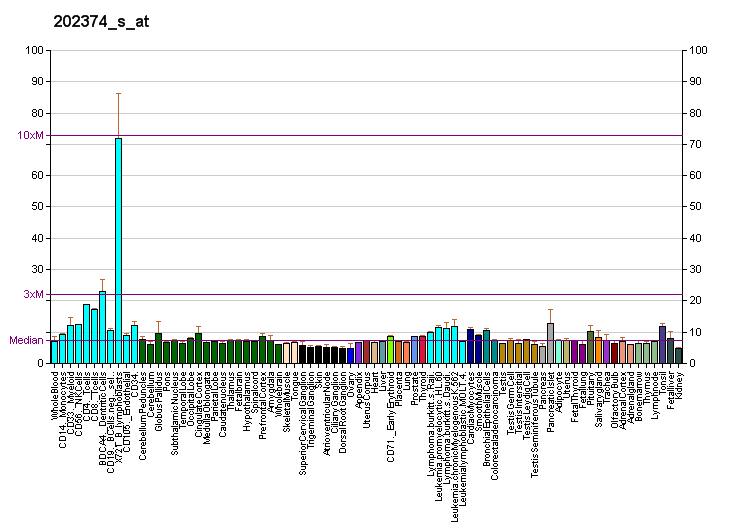
RNA expression pattern
| Bgee | Human / Mouse (ortholog); Top expressed in: Epithelium of choroid plexus; lateral nuclear group of thalamus; spinal ganglia; pericardium; trigeminal ganglion; pons; Brodmann area 46; cardia; beta cell; endothelial cell / Top expressed in: zygote; secondary oocyte; granulocyte; dentate gyrus of hippocampal formation granule cell; substantia nigra; facial motor nucleus; primary oocyte; superior frontal gyrus; primary visual cortex; decidua; More reference expression data |
| BioGPS | More reference expression data |
Gene ontology
| Molecular function | enzyme regulator activity; enzyme activator activity; GTPase activator activity; protein heterodimerization activity; protein binding |
| Cellular component | plasma membrane; endoplasmic reticulum membrane; cytoplasm; cytosol; protein-containing complex |
| Biological process | regulation of GTPase activity; positive regulation of protein lipidation; establishment of protein localization to endoplasmic reticulum membrane; intracellular protein transport; positive regulation of autophagosome assembly; positive regulation of endoplasmic reticulum tubular network organization; positive regulation of catalytic activity; positive regulation of GTPase activity |
Sources:Amigo / QuickGO
Orthologs
| Databases | NCBI: entry; OMA: entry |
| Species | Human | Mouse |
| Entrez | 25782 | 98732 |
| Ensembl | ENSG00000118873 | ENSMUSG00000039318 |
| UniProt | Q9H2M9 | Q8BMG7 |
| RefSeq (mRNA) | NM_012414 | NM_001163754; NM_172649 |
| RefSeq (protein) | NP_036546 | NP_001157226; NP_001392257 |
| Location (UCSC) | Chr 1: 220.15 – 220.27 Mb | Chr 1: 184.94 – 185.02 Mb |
| PubMed search |
- Wikidata
| View/Edit Human | View/Edit Mouse |

Rab3 GTPase-activating protein non-catalytic subunit is an enzyme that in humans is encoded by the RAB3GAP2 gene.

Members of the RAB3 protein family (see RAB3A; MIM 179490) are implicated in Ca(2+)-dependent exocytosis. RAB3GAP, which is involved in regulation of RAB3 activity, is a heterodimeric complex consisting a 130-kD catalytic subunit (RAB3GAP1; MIM 602536) and a 150-kD noncatalytic subunit (RAB3GAP2) (Nagano et al., 1998).[supplied by OMIM]
