= Cytochrome P450 (individual enzymes) =

List of Cytochrome P450 enzymes

In biochemistry, cytochrome P450 enzymes have been identified in all kingdoms of life: animals, plants, fungi, protists, bacteria, and archaea, as well as in viruses. As of 2018, more than 300,000 distinct CYP proteins are known.

== P450s in humans ==
Human P450s are primarily membrane-associated proteins located either in the inner membrane of mitochondria or in the endoplasmic reticulum of cells. P450s metabolize thousands of endogenous and exogenous chemicals. Some P450s metabolize only one (or a very few) substrates, such as CYP19 (aromatase), while others may metabolize multiple substrates. Both of these characteristics account for medicinal interest. Cytochrome P450 enzymes play roles in hormone synthesis and breakdown (including estrogen and testosterone synthesis and metabolism), cholesterol synthesis, and vitamin D metabolism. Cytochrome P450 enzymes also function to metabolize potentially toxic compounds, including drugs and products of endogenous metabolism such as bilirubin, principally in the liver.

The Human Genome Project has identified 57 human genes coding for the various cytochrome P450 enzymes.

=== Drug metabolism ===
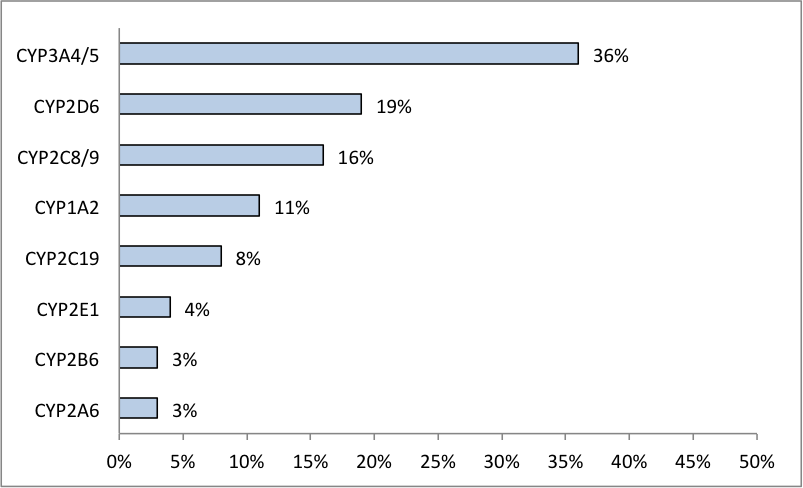
Proportion of antifungal drugs metabolized by different families of P450s.

P450s are the major enzymes involved in drug metabolism, accounting for about 75% of the total metabolism. Most drugs undergo deactivation by P450s, either directly or by facilitated excretion from the body. On the other hand, many substances are bioactivated by P450s to form their active compounds like the antiplatelet drug clopidogrel and the opiate codeine.

The CYP450 enzyme superfamily comprises 57 active subsets, with seven playing roles in the metabolism of most pharmaceuticals. The fluctuation in the amount of CYP450 enzymes (CYP1A2, CYP2C8, CYP2C9, CYP2C19, CYP2D6, CYP3A4, and CYP3A5) in phase 1 (detoxification) can have varying effects on individuals, as genetic expression varies from person to person. This variation is due to the enzyme's genetic polymorphism, which leads to variability in its function and expression. To optimize drug metabolism in individuals, genetic testing should be conducted to determine functional foods and specific phytonutrients that cater to the individual's CYP450 polymorphism. Understanding these genetic variations can help personalize drug therapies for improved effectiveness and reduced adverse reactions.

==== Drug interaction ====
Many drugs may increase or decrease the activity of various P450 isozymes either by inducing the biosynthesis of an isozyme (enzyme induction) or by directly inhibiting the activity of the P450 (enzyme inhibition). A classical example includes anti-epileptic drugs, such as phenytoin, which induces CYP1A2, CYP2C9, CYP2C19, and CYP3A4. P450 induction is often due to a xenobiotic-sensing receptor being activated by the drug, which the cell takes as a signal for further activating the xenobiotic metabolism machinery.

Effects on P450 isozyme activity are a major source of adverse drug interactions, since changes in P450 enzyme activity may affect the metabolism and clearance of various drugs. For example, if one drug inhibits the P450-mediated metabolism of another drug, the second drug may accumulate within the body to toxic levels. Hence, these drug interactions may necessitate dosage adjustments or choosing drugs that do not interact with the P450 system.

Many substrates for CYP3A4 are drugs with a narrow therapeutic index, such as amiodarone or carbamazepine. Because these drugs are metabolized by CYP3A4, the mean plasma levels of these drugs may increase because of enzyme inhibition or decrease because of enzyme induction.

==== Interaction of other substances ====
Naturally occurring compounds may also induce or inhibit P450 activity. For example, bioactive compounds found in grapefruit juice and some other fruit juices, including bergamottin, dihydroxybergamottin, and paradicin-A, have been found to inhibit CYP3A4-mediated metabolism of certain medications, leading to increased bioavailability and, thus, the strong possibility of overdosing. Because of this risk, avoiding grapefruit juice and fresh grapefruits entirely while on drugs is usually advised.

Other examples:

- Saint-John's wort, a common herbal remedy induces CYP3A4, but also inhibits CYP1A1, CYP1B1.
- Tobacco smoking induces CYP1A2 (example CYP1A2 substrates are clozapine, olanzapine, and fluvoxamine)
- At relatively high concentrations, starfruit juice has also been shown to inhibit CYP2A6 and other P450s. Watercress is also a known inhibitor of the cytochrome P450 CYP2E1, which may result in altered drug metabolism for individuals on certain medications (e.g., chlorzoxazone).
- Tributyltin inhibits cytochrome P450, leading to masculinization of mollusks.
- Goldenseal, with its two notable alkaloids berberine and hydrastine, has been shown to alter P450-marker enzymatic activities (involving CYP2C9, CYP2D6, and CYP3A4).

=== Other specific P450 functions ===
==== Steroid hormones ====
Steroidogenesis, showing many of the enzyme activities that are performed by cytochrome P450 enzymes. HSD: Hydroxysteroid dehydrogenase.

A subset of cytochrome P450 enzymes play roles in the synthesis of steroid hormones (steroidogenesis) by the adrenals, gonads, and peripheral tissue:

- CYP11A1 (also known as P450scc or P450c11a1) in adrenal mitochondria affects "the activity formerly known as 20,22-desmolase" (steroid 20α-hydroxylase, steroid 22-hydroxylase, cholesterol side-chain scission).
- CYP11B1 (encoding the protein P450c11β) found in the inner mitochondrial membrane of adrenal cortex has steroid 11β-hydroxylase, steroid 18-hydroxylase, and steroid 18-methyloxidase activities.
- CYP11B2 (encoding the protein P450c11AS), found only in the mitochondria of the adrenal zona glomerulosa, has steroid 11β-hydroxylase, steroid 18-hydroxylase, and steroid 18-methyloxidase activities.
- CYP17A1, in endoplasmic reticulum of adrenal cortex has steroid 17α-hydroxylase and 17,20-lyase activities.
- CYP21A2 (P450c21) in adrenal cortex conducts 21-hydroxylase activity.
- CYP19A (P450arom, aromatase) in endoplasmic reticulum of gonads, brain, adipose tissue, and elsewhere catalyzes aromatization of androgens to estrogens.

==== Polyunsaturated fatty acids and eicosanoids ====
Certain cytochrome P450 enzymes are critical in metabolizing polyunsaturated fatty acids (PUFAs) to biologically active, intercellular cell signaling molecules (eicosanoids) and/or metabolize biologically active metabolites of the PUFA to less active or inactive products. These CYPs possess cytochrome P450 omega hydroxylase and/or epoxygenase enzyme activity.

- CYP1A1, CYP1A2, and CYP2E1 metabolize endogenous PUFAs to signaling molecules: they metabolize arachidonic acid (i.e. AA) to 19-hydroxyeicosatetraenoic acid (i.e. 19-HETE; see 20-hydroxyeicosatetraenoic acid); eicosapentaenoic acid (i.e. EPA) to epoxyeicosatetraenoic acids (i.e. EEQs); and docosahexaenoic acid (i.e. DHA) to epoxydocosapentaenoic acids (i.e. EDPs).
- CYP2C8, CYP2C9, CYP2C18, CYP2C19, and CYP2J2 metabolize endogenous PUFAs to signaling molecules: they metabolize AA to epoxyeicosatetraenoic acids (i.e. EETs); EPA to EEQs; and DHA to EDPs.
- CYP2S1 metabolizes PUFA to signaling molecules: it metabolizes AA to EETs and EPA to EEQs.
- CYP3A4 metabolizes AA to EET signaling molecules.
- CYP4A11 metabolizes endogenous PUFAs to signaling molecules: it metabolizes AA to 20-HETE and EETs; it also hydroxylates DHA to 22-hydroxy-DHA (i.e. 12-HDHA).
- CYP4F2, CYP4F3A, and CYP4F3B (see CYP4F3 for latter two CYPs) metabolize PUFAs to signaling molecules: they metabolize AA to 20-HETE. They also metabolize EPA to 19-hydroxyeicosapentaenoic acid (19-HEPE) and 20-hydroxyeicosapentaenoic acid (20-HEPE) as well as metabolize DHA to 22-HDA. They also inactivate or reduce the activity of signaling molecules: they metabolize leukotriene B4 (LTB4) to 20-hydroxy-LTB4, 5-hydroxyeicosatetraenoic acid (5-HETE) to 5,20-diHETE, 5-oxo-eicosatetraenoic acid (5-oxo-ETE) to 5-oxo-20-hydroxy-ETE, 12-hydroxyeicosatetraenoic acid (12-HETE) to 12,20-diHETE, EETs to 20-hydroxy-EETs, and lipoxins to 20-hydroxy products.
- CYP4F8 and CYP4F12 metabolize PUFAs to signaling molecules: they metabolizes EPA to EEQs and DHA to EDPs. They also metabolize AA to 18-hydroxyeicosatetraenoic acid (18-HETE) and 19-HETE.
- CYP4F11 inactivates or reduces the activity of signaling molecules: it metabolizes LTB4 to 20-hydroxy-LTB4, (5-HETE) to 5,20-diHETE, (5-oxo-ETE) to 5-oxo-20-hydroxy-ETE, (12-HETE) to 12,20-diHETE, (15-HETE) to 15,20-diHETE, EETs to 20-hydroxy-EETs, and lipoxins to 20-hydroxy products.
- CYP4F22 ω-hydroxylates extremely long "very long chain fatty acids", i.e. fatty acids that are 28 or more carbons long. The ω-hydroxylation of these special fatty acids is critical to creating and maintaining the skin's water barrier function; autosomal recessive inactivating mutations of CYP4F22 are associated with the lamellar ichthyosis subtype of congenital ichthyosiform erythroderma in humans.

=== CYP families in humans ===
Humans have 57 genes and more than 59 pseudogenes divided among 18 families of cytochrome P450 genes and 43 subfamilies. This is a summary of the genes and of the proteins they encode. See the homepage of the cytochrome P450 Nomenclature Committee for detailed information.

Family	Function	Members	Genes	Pseudogenes
CYP1	drug and steroid (especially estrogen) metabolism, benzo[a]pyrene toxification (forming (+)-benzo[a]pyrene-7,8-dihydrodiol-9,10-epoxide)	3 subfamilies, 3 genes, 1 pseudogene	CYP1A1, CYP1A2, CYP1B1	CYP1D1P
CYP2	drug and steroid metabolism	13 subfamilies, 16 genes, 16 pseudogenes	CYP2A6, CYP2A7, CYP2A13, CYP2B6, CYP2C8, CYP2C9, CYP2C18, CYP2C19, CYP2D6, CYP2E1, CYP2F1, CYP2J2, CYP2R1, CYP2S1, CYP2U1, CYP2W1	Too many to list
CYP3	drug and steroid (including testosterone) metabolism	1 subfamily, 4 genes, 4 pseudogenes	CYP3A4, CYP3A5, CYP3A7, CYP3A43	CYP3A51P, CYP3A52P, CYP3A54P, CYP3A137P
CYP4	arachidonic acid or fatty acid metabolism	6 subfamilies, 12 genes, 10 pseudogenes	CYP4A11, CYP4A22, CYP4B1, CYP4F2, CYP4F3, CYP4F8, CYP4F11, CYP4F12, CYP4F22, CYP4V2, CYP4X1, CYP4Z1	Too many to list
CYP5	thromboxane A_{2} synthase	1 subfamily, 1 gene	CYP5A1	
CYP7	bile acid biosynthesis 7-alpha hydroxylase of steroid nucleus	2 subfamilies, 2 genes	CYP7A1, CYP7B1	
CYP8	varied	2 subfamilies, 2 genes	CYP8A1 (prostacyclin synthase), CYP8B1 (bile acid biosynthesis)	
CYP11	steroid biosynthesis	2 subfamilies, 3 genes	CYP11A1, CYP11B1, CYP11B2	
CYP17	steroid biosynthesis, 17-alpha hydroxylase	1 subfamily, 1 gene	CYP17A1	
CYP19	steroid biosynthesis: aromatase synthesizes estrogen	1 subfamily, 1 gene	CYP19A1	
CYP20	unknown function	1 subfamily, 1 gene	CYP20A1	
CYP21	steroid biosynthesis	1 subfamilies, 1 gene, 1 pseudogene	CYP21A2	CYP21A1P
CYP24	vitamin D degradation	1 subfamily, 1 gene	CYP24A1	
CYP26	retinoic acid hydroxylase	3 subfamilies, 3 genes	CYP26A1, CYP26B1, CYP26C1	
CYP27	varied	3 subfamilies, 3 genes	CYP27A1 (bile acid biosynthesis), CYP27B1 (vitamin D_{3} 1-alpha hydroxylase, activates vitamin D_{3}), CYP27C1 (vitamin A1 to A2)	
CYP39	7-alpha hydroxylation of 24-hydroxycholesterol	1 subfamily, 1 gene	CYP39A1	
CYP46	cholesterol 24-hydroxylase	1 subfamily, 1 gene, 1 pseudogene	CYP46A1	CYP46A4P
CYP51	cholesterol biosynthesis	1 subfamily, 1 gene, 3 pseudogenes	CYP51A1 (lanosterol 14-alpha demethylase)	CYP51P1, CYP51P2, CYP51P3

== P450s in other species ==
=== Animals ===
Other animals often have more P450 genes than humans do. Reported numbers range from 35 genes in the sponge Amphimedon queenslandica to 235 genes in the cephalochordate Branchiostoma floridae. Mice have genes for 101 P450s, and sea urchins have even more (perhaps as many as 120 genes). Most CYP enzymes are presumed to have monooxygenase activity, as is the case for most mammalian CYPs that have been investigated (except for, e.g., CYP19 and CYP5). Gene and genome sequencing is far outpacing biochemical characterization of enzymatic function, though many genes with close homology to CYPs with known function have been found, giving clues to their functionality.

The classes of P450s most often investigated in non-human animals are those either involved in development (e.g., retinoic acid or hormone metabolism) or involved in the metabolism of toxic compounds (such as heterocyclic amines or polyaromatic hydrocarbons). Often there are differences in gene regulation or enzyme function of P450s in related animals that explain observed differences in susceptibility to toxic compounds (ex. canines' inability to metabolize xanthines such as caffeine). Some drugs undergo metabolism in both species via different enzymes, resulting in different metabolites, while other drugs are metabolized in one species but excreted unchanged in another species. For this reason, one species's reaction to a substance is not a reliable indication of the substance's effects in humans. A species of Sonoran Desert Drosophila that uses an upregulated expression of the CYP28A1 gene for detoxification of cacti rot is Drosophila mettleri. Flies of this species have adapted an upregulation of this gene due to exposure of high levels of alkaloids in host plants.

P450s have been extensively examined in mice, rats, dogs, zebrafish, and turkeys. CYP1A5 and CYP3A37 in turkeys were found to be very similar to the human CYP1A2 and CYP3A4 respectively, in terms of their kinetic properties as well as in the metabolism of aflatoxin B1.

CYPs have also been extensively studied in insects, often to understand pesticide resistance. For example, CYP6G1 is linked to insecticide resistance in DDT-resistant Drosophila melanogaster and CYP6M2 in the mosquito malaria vector Anopheles gambiae is capable of directly metabolizing pyrethroids. Other cytochromes, such as those in Anopheles gambiae, are under preliminary research for their potential role in pesticide resistance, infectious diseases, and malaria.

=== Microbial ===
Microbial cytochromes P450 are often soluble enzymes and are involved in diverse metabolic processes. In bacteria the distribution of P450s is very variable with many bacteria having no identified P450s (e.g. E.coli). Some bacteria, predominantly actinomycetes, have numerous P450s (e.g.,). Those so far identified are generally involved in either biotransformation of xenobiotic compounds (e.g. CYP105A1 from Streptomyces griseolus metabolizes sulfonylurea herbicides to less toxic derivatives,) or are part of specialised metabolite biosynthetic pathways (e.g. CYP170B1 catalyses production of the sesquiterpenoid albaflavenone in Streptomyces albus). Although no P450 has yet been shown to be essential in a microbe, the CYP105 family is highly conserved with a representative in every streptomycete genome sequenced so far. Due to the solubility of bacterial P450 enzymes, they are generally regarded as easier to work with than the predominantly membrane bound eukaryotic P450s. This, combined with the remarkable chemistry they catalyse, has led to many studies using the heterologously expressed proteins in vitro. Few studies have investigated what P450s do in vivo, what the natural substrate(s) are and how P450s contribute to survival of the bacteria in the natural environment.Three examples that have contributed significantly to structural and mechanistic studies are listed here, but many different families exist.

- Cytochrome P450 cam (CYP101A1) originally from Pseudomonas putida has been used as a model for many cytochromes P450 and was the first cytochrome P450 three-dimensional protein structure solved by X-ray crystallography. This enzyme is part of a camphor-hydroxylating catalytic cycle consisting of two electron transfer steps from putidaredoxin, a 2Fe-2S cluster-containing protein cofactor.
- Cytochrome P450 eryF (CYP107A1) originally from the actinomycete bacterium Saccharopolyspora erythraea is responsible for the biosynthesis of the antibiotic erythromycin by C6-hydroxylation of the macrolide 6-deoxyerythronolide B.
- Cytochrome P450 BM3 (CYP102A1) from the soil bacterium Bacillus megaterium catalyzes the NADPH-dependent hydroxylation of several long-chain fatty acids at the ω–1 through ω–3 positions. Unlike almost every other known CYP (except CYP505A1, cytochrome P450 foxy), it constitutes a natural fusion protein between the CYP domain and an electron donating cofactor. Thus, BM3 is potentially very useful in biotechnological applications.
- Cytochrome P450 119 (CYP119A1) isolated from the thermophillic archea Sulfolobus solfataricus has been used in a variety of mechanistic studies. Because thermophillic enzymes evolved to function at high temperatures, they tend to function more slowly at room temperature (if at all) and are therefore excellent mechanistic models.

=== Fungi ===
The commonly used azole class of antifungal drugs works by inhibition of the fungal cytochrome P450 14α-demethylase.

=== Plants ===
Cytochromes P450 are involved in a variety of processes of plant growth, development, and defense. It is estimated that P450 genes make up approximately 1% of the plant genome. These enzymes lead to various fatty acid conjugates, plant hormones, secondary metabolites, lignins, and a variety of defensive compounds.

Cytochromes P450 play roles in plant defense– involvement in phytoalexin biosynthesis, hormone metabolism, and biosynthesis of diverse secondary metabolites. The expression of cytochrome p450 genes is regulated in response to environmental stresses indicative of a critical role in plant defense mechanisms.

The biosynthesis of phytoalexins, antimicrobial compounds produced by some plants, involves the P450 enzymes CYP79B2, CYP79B3, CYP71A12, CYP71A13, and CYP71B15. The first step of camalexin biosynthesis produces indole-3-acetaldoxime (IAOx) from tryptophan and is catalyzed by either CYP79B2 or CYP79B3. IAOx is then immediately converted to indole-3-acetonitrile (IAN) and is controlled by either CYP71A13 or its homolog CYP71A12. The last two steps of the biosynthesis pathway of camalexin are catalyzed by CYP71B15. In these steps, indole-3-carboxylic acid (DHCA) is formed from cysteine-indole-3-acetonitrile (Cys(IAN)) followed by the biosynthesis of camalexin. There are some intermediate steps within the pathway that remain unclear, but it is well understood that cytochrome P450 is pivotal in camalexin biosynthesis and that this phytoalexin plays a major role in plant defense mechanisms.

Cytochromes P450 are largely responsible for the synthesis of the jasmonic acid (JA), a common hormonal defenses against abiotic and biotic stresses for plant cells. For example, a P450, CYP74A is involved in the dehydration reaction to produce an insatiable allene oxide from hydroperoxide. JA chemical reactions are critical in the presence of biotic stresses that can be caused by plant wounding, specifically shown in the plant, Arabidopsis. As a prohormone, jasmonic acid must be converted to the JA-isoleucine (JA-Ile) conjugate by JAR1 catalysation in order to be considered activated. Then, JA-Ile synthesis leads to the assembly of the co-receptor complex compo`sed of COI1 and several JAZ proteins. Under low JA-Ile conditions, the JAZ protein components act as transcriptional repressors to suppress downstream JA genes. However, under adequate JA-Ile conditions, the JAZ proteins are ubiquitinated and undergo degradation through the 26S proteasome, resulting in functional downstream effects. Furthermore, several CYP94s (CYP94C1 and CYP94B3) are related to JA-Ile turnover and show that JA-Ile oxidation status impacts plant signaling in a catabolic manner. Cytochrome P450 hormonal regulation in response to extracellular and intracellular stresses is critical for proper plant defense response. This has been proven through thorough analysis of various CYP P450s in jasmonic acid and phytoalexin pathways.

Cytochrome P450 aromatic O-demethylase, which is made of two distinct promiscuous parts: a cytochrome P450 protein (GcoA) and three domain reductase, is significant for its ability to convert Lignin, the aromatic biopolymer common in plant cell walls, into renewable carbon chains in a catabolic set of reactions. In short, it is a facilitator of a critical step in Lignin conversion.

== InterPro subfamilies ==
InterPro subfamilies:

- Cytochrome P450, B-class InterPro: IPR002397
- Cytochrome P450, mitochondrial InterPro: IPR002399
- Cytochrome P450, E-class, group I InterPro: IPR002401
- Cytochrome P450, E-class, group II InterPro: IPR002402
- Cytochrome P450, E-class, group IV InterPro: IPR002403
- Aromatase

Clozapine, imipramine, paracetamol, phenacetin Heterocyclic aryl amines Inducible and CYP1A2 5-10% deficient oxidize uroporphyrinogen to uroporphyrin (CYP1A2) in heme metabolism, but they may have additional undiscovered endogenous substrates. are inducible by some polycyclic hydrocarbons, some of which are found in cigarette smoke and charred food.

These enzymes are of interest, because in assays, they can activate compounds to carcinogens. High levels of CYP1A2 have been linked to an increased risk of colon cancer. Since the 1A2 enzyme can be induced by cigarette smoking, this links smoking with colon cancer.

== See also ==
- Steroidogenic enzyme
- CYP11 family
