= Cytochrome P450 engineering =

This article covers protein engineering of cytochrome (CYP) P450 enzymes. P450s are involved in a range of biochemical catabolic and anabolic process. Natural P450s can perform several different types of chemical reactions including hydroxylations, N,O,S-dealkylations, epoxidations, sulfoxidations, aryl-aryl couplings, ring contractions and expansions, oxidative cyclizations, alcohol/aldehyde oxidations, desaturations, nitrogen oxidations, decarboxylations, nitrations, as well as oxidative and reductive dehalogenations. Engineering efforts often strive for 1) improved stability 2) improved activity 3) improved substrate scope 4) enabled ability to catalyze unnatural reactions. P450 engineering is an emerging field in the areas of chemical biology and synthetic organic chemistry (chemoenzymatic).

== Approaches to engineering cytochrome P450 enzymes ==
=== Rational ===
Rational enzyme engineering is characterized by making specific amino acid mutations based on mechanistic or structural information. While P450 enzymes are mechanistically well understood, mutations based on structural information are often limited by crystallization difficulty. Although, when obtainable, the high degree of flexibility and active site plasticity present in P450s make crystal structures largely obsolete for rational design. Another issue presents itself when attempting to expand substrate scope. This is often achieved by increasing the P450 active site size, which in turn can result in multiple substrate docking orientations, resulting in poor regio-/stereoselectivity.

=== Directed evolution ===
Directed evolution is an enzyme engineering strategy designed to mimic natural selection in a laboratory setting. Due to the difficulty in implementing rational design strategies, directed evolution has become the strategy of choice for P450 engineering. Here, mutations can be introduced either semi-rationally or randomly via site-saturation mutagenesis. The resulting P450 mutant (typically mutant library) is then screened for desired activity. Mutants displaying enhanced properties are forwarded to subsequent rounds of mutagenesis, repeating this cycle until the desired function is adequately met.

== P450 engineering examples ==
=== P450 BM3 ===
P450 BM3 (also known as CYP102A1) is a cytochrome P450 enzyme isolated from Bacillus megaterium. BM3 has been extensively studied in the context of enzyme engineering due to its solubility, tractable bacterial isoforms and self-sufficient electron transport system, but also due to its synthetic utility. Engineering studies have revealed that BM3 mutants can 1) be endowed with new and differentiated substrate scopes 2) exhibit regio-/stereoselectivity on new substrates and 3) be engineered to be highly selective and active towards new substrates. BM3 variants have been particularly useful to produce fragrances, flavors, pheromones and pharmaceuticals. Artemisinic acid (used in the production of the pharmaceutical natural product artemisinin) was produced utilizing a BM3 variant responsible for epoxidizing the two alkenes present in amorpha-4,11-diene. Oxidation of valencene to nootkatone (a prized grapefruit flavor) was accomplished utilizing a F87T and I263A mutant (Figure 1).

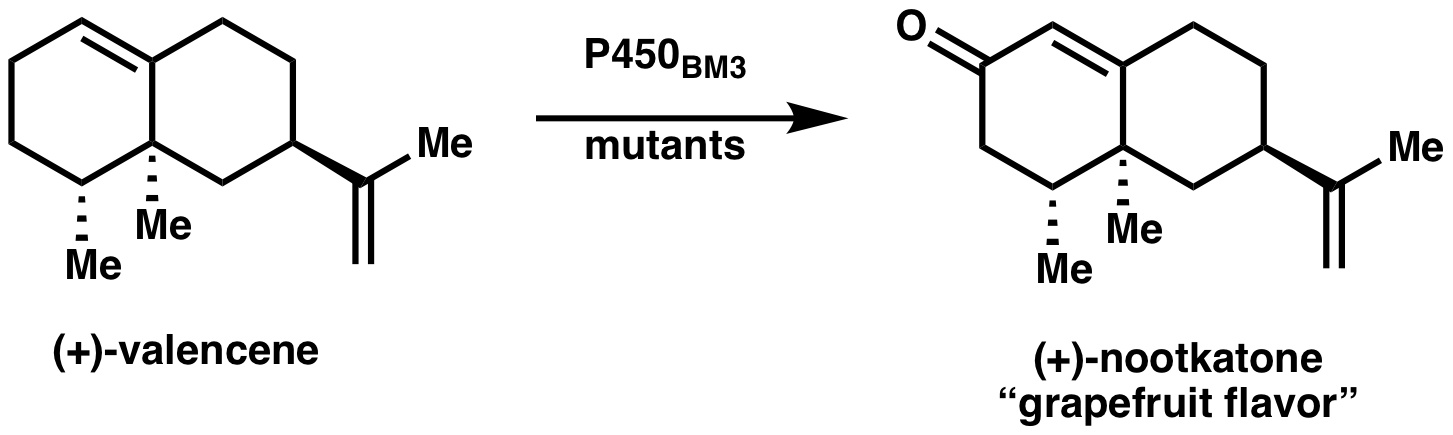
Figure 1. Oxidation of (+)-valencene utilizing P450_{BM3} F87T I263A mutant

Recently, Wang et al. reported a BM3 variant capable of performing styrenyl olefin cyclopropanation. As native BM3 displays poor cyclopropanation activity, an enzyme engineering effort was undertaken. At their core, P450s are heme-thiolate enzymes which utilize molecular oxygen (O_{2}) and NAD(P)H to perform oxygenation reactions. As such, BM3 prefers to perform epoxidation opposed to cyclopropanation reactions in the presence of olefins. The reaction between ethyl diazoacetate (EDA) and 1 was chosen as a model reaction due to the known difficulty of epoxidizing electron-deficient olefins utilizing transitional metal catalysis (Figure 2). This reaction generates compound 2, which can easily be converted to levomilnacipran (Fetzima), a pharmaceutical used to treat clinical depression. To begin, mutants were generated where the axial coordinating cysteine residue in the catalytic center was replaced with amino acids serine, alanine, methionine, histidine and tyrosine. The mutant T268A-axH, which has an axial histidine ligand catalyzed the reaction between EDA and 1 in 81% yield with 6:94 diastereoselectivity and 42% enantioselectivity. Subsequent rounds of site-saturation mutagenesis were then performed, resulted in the variant named BM3-Hstar (containing T268A-axH, L437W, V78M and L181V mutations), which could catalyze the model reaction with greater than 92% yield, 92% enantioselectivity and 2:98 diastereoselectivity. As an added advantage, BM3-Hstar was also capable of performing the desired cyclopropanation reaction in the presence of atmospheric oxygen (O2) (the only known BM3 variant capable of this).

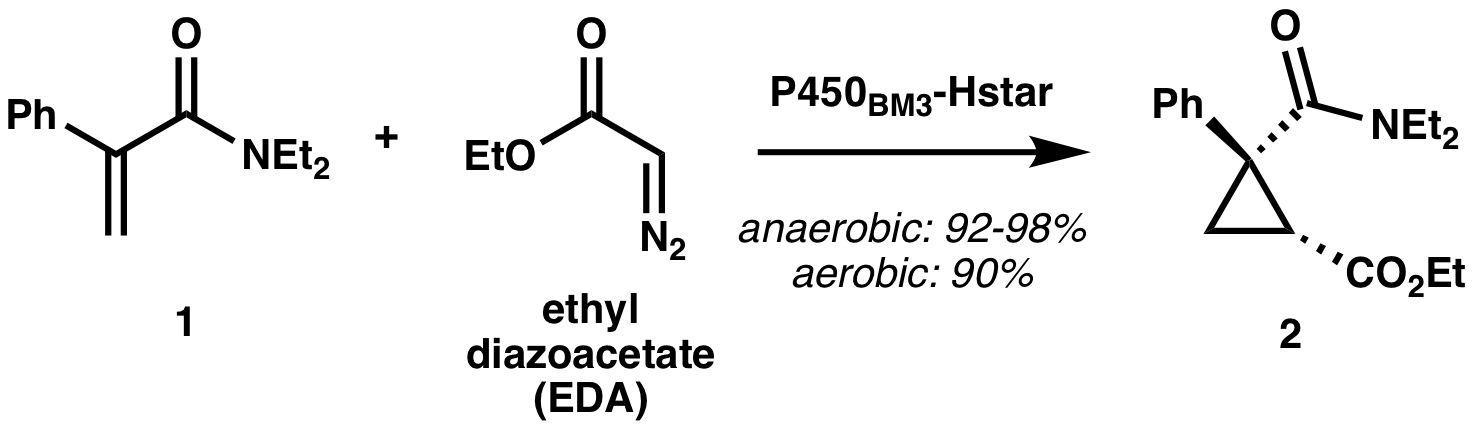
Figure 2. Reaction between 1 and ethyl diazoacetate (EDA) catalyzed by BM3-Hstar

=== CYP125 ===
Aside from their synthetic utility, P450 enzymes have also been engineered to better understand their biochemistry. Based on the proposed catalytic cycle, an axially ligated thiolate moiety (cysteine) donates electron density to the metal center aiding in protonation of a ferric-peroxo anion intermediate (^{−}O-O-Fe^{3+}) which upon water loss generates a C-H bond reactive iron-oxo species (O=Fe^{4+}). Alternatively, if the ferric-peroxo anion remains un-protonated, this reactive species can mediate C-C bond cleavage in aldehyde-containing substrates (deformylation). In order to better understand intermediate dichotomy between the ferric-peroxo anion and iron-oxo species, CYP125 (which is responsible for various metabolic processes including cholesterol degradation) was engineered to replace the axial ligated cysteine residue with selenocysteine (SeCYP125). In turn, it was observed that SeCYP125 favors formation of oxidized products vs deformylated products when reacted with cholesterol-26-aldehyde, indicating that increased electron donation from selenocysteine relative to cysteine results in a higher proportion of iron-oxo relative to ferric-peroxo anion (Figure 3).

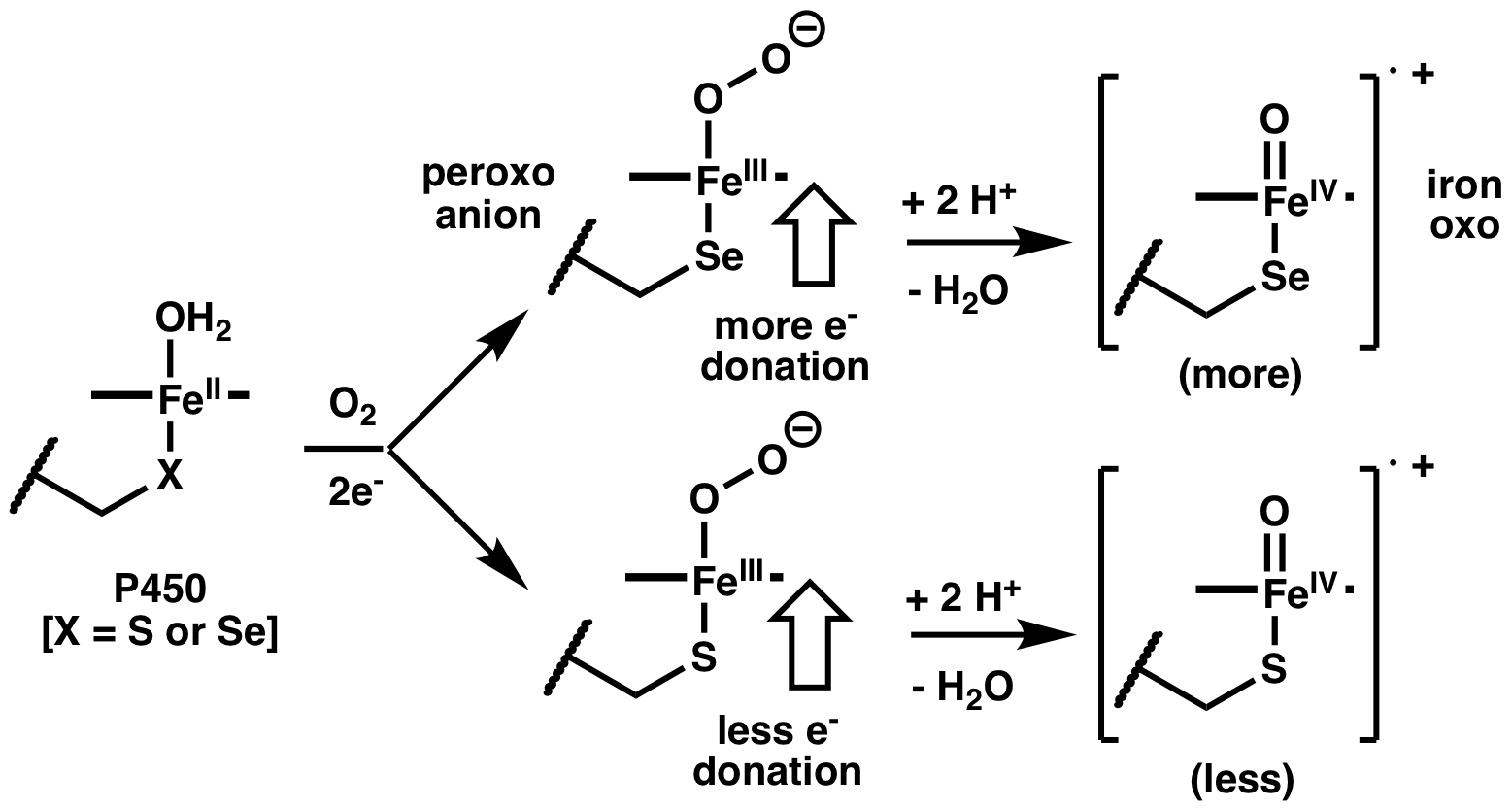
Figure 3. Comparison of axial ligand effects on the ferric-peroxo anion in CYP125's catalytic cycle

=== Ir(Me)-CYP119-Max ===
In 2016, work published by Dydio et al. reported an artificial metalloenzyme capable of catalyzing intra-/intermolecular carbene C-H insertions into activated/unactivated C-H bonds, with kinetics like that of a native enzyme (Figure 4). The reported catalyst was developed by switching the iron-protoporphyrin cofactor in thermostable P450 enzyme CYP119A1 with an iridium-methyl-protoporphyrin cofactor (Ir(Me)-PIX), followed by directed evolution. CYP119-Max, a quadruple mutant (C317G, T213G, L69V, V254L), was subsequently obtained. Enantiomeric excesses (ee’s) of up to ±98% were obtained with a fixed catalyst loading of 0.17 mol %. CYP119-Max can also undergo intermolecular insertion reactions, albeit with moderate ee (68%). To demonstrate the applicability of CYP119-Max in the production of fine chemicals, a 200 mM scale reaction produced ethyl-2,3-dihydrobenzofuran-3-carboxylate in 44% yield, with 35,000 turnover number (TON) and 93% ee.

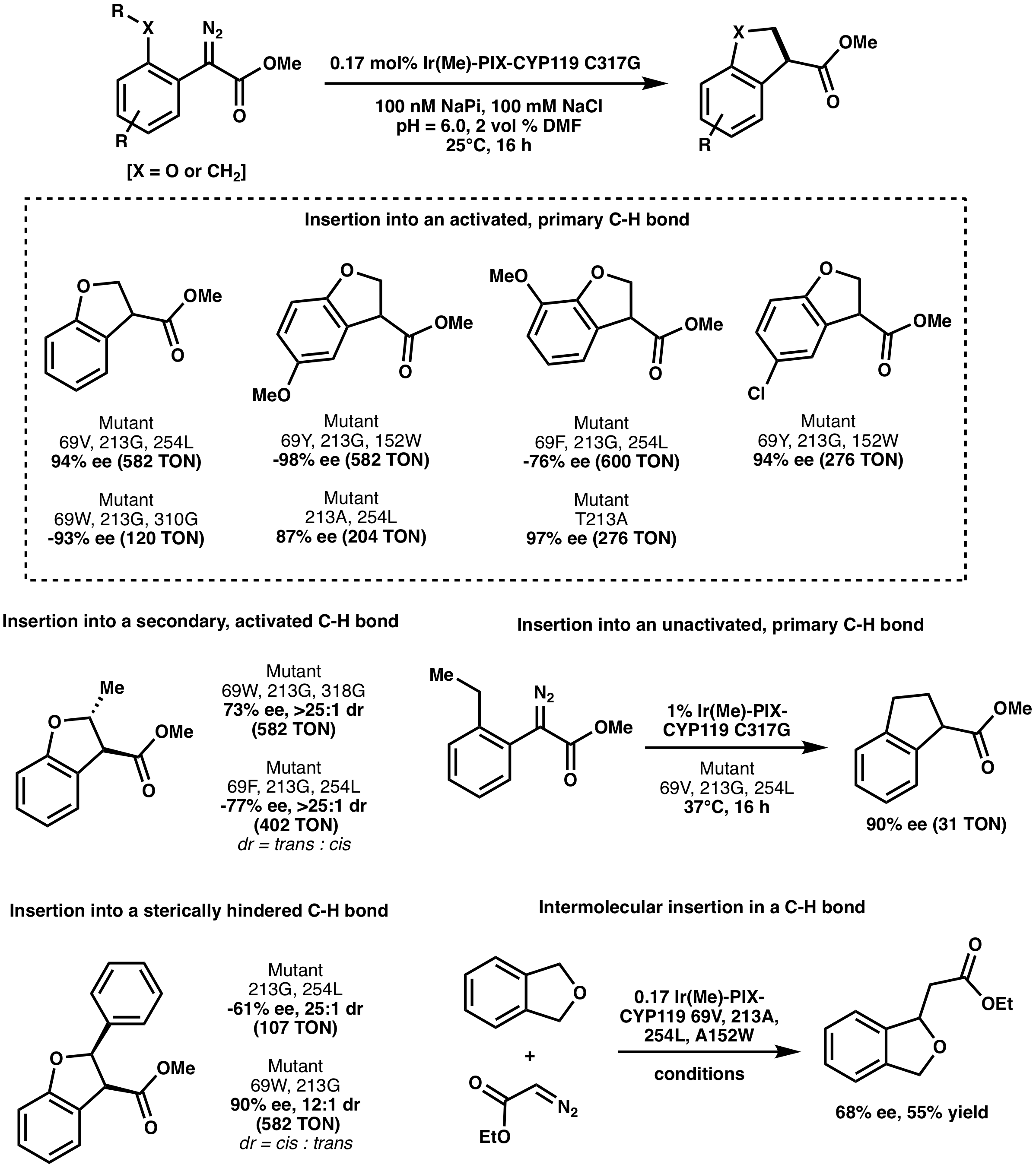
Figure 4. Reactions catalyzed by metalloenzyme CYP119 Ir(Me)-PIX-CYP119 mutants
