= CYP55 family =

Group of cytochrome P450 enzymes

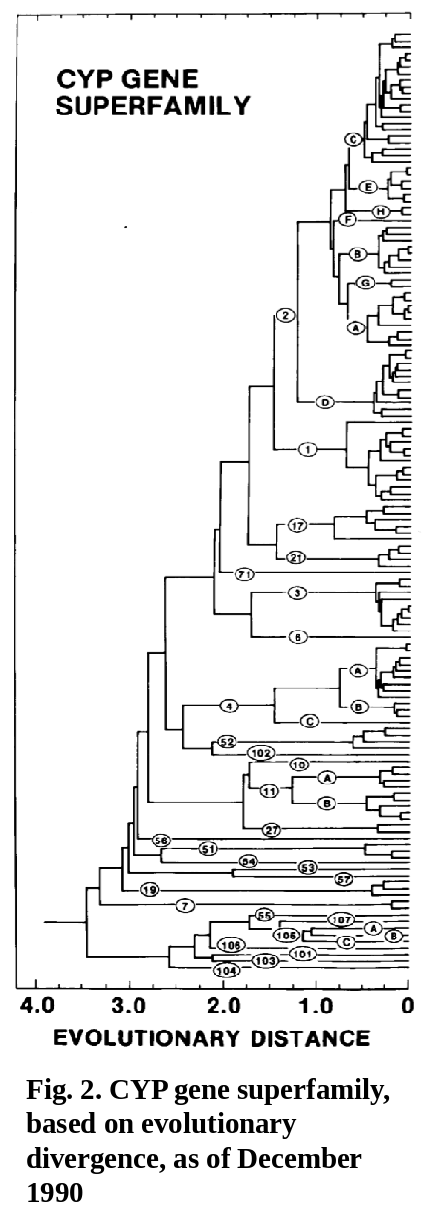
The evolutionary divergence of the CYP superfamily collected in 1990, CYP55 is in the branch of prokaryotic CYPs

Cytochrome P450, family 55, also known as CYP55, is a cytochrome P450 family in fungi supposed to derived from horizontal gene transfer of Actinomycetes CYP105 family member in the ancestor of all Dikarya (Ascomycota and Basidiomycota). The first gene identified in this family is the CYP55A1 from Fusarium oxysporum encoding the NADPH dependent reductase of nitrous oxide (P450nor cytochrome P450nor).
