= LSMEM2 =

Protein-coding gene in the species Homo sapiens

Identifiers
- Aliases: LSMEM2, C3orf45, leucine rich single-pass membrane protein 2
- External IDs: MGI: 3612240; GeneCards: LSMEM2

Gene location (Human)
| Chr. | Chromosome 3 (human) |
| Band | 3p21.31 | Start | 50,279,087 bp |
| Band | 3p21.31 | End | 50,288,114 bp |
RNA expression pattern
| Bgee | Human / Mouse (ortholog); Top expressed in: apex of heart; left ventricle; testicle; muscle of thigh; right auricle of heart; gastrocnemius muscle; skeletal muscle tissue; right ventricle; tibial nerve; right testis / n/a; More reference expression data |
| BioGPS | n/a |
Orthologs
| Databases | NCBI: entry; OMA: entry |
| Species | Human | Mouse |
| Entrez | 132228 | 434436 |
| Ensembl | ENSG00000179564 | ENSMUSG00000103409 |
| UniProt | Q8N112 | n/a |
| RefSeq (mRNA) | NM_001304385; NM_153215 | NM_001081244 |
| RefSeq (protein) | NP_001291314; NP_694947 | n/a |
| Location (UCSC) | Chr 3: 50.28 – 50.29 Mb | n/a |
| PubMed search |
- Wikidata
| View/Edit Human | View/Edit Mouse |

Leucine rich single-pass membrane protein 2 is a single-pass membrane protein rich in leucine, that in humans is encoded by the LSMEM2 gene (also known as c3orf45). The LSMEM2 protein is conserved in mammals, birds, and reptiles. In humans, LSMEM2 is found to be highly expressed in the heart, skeletal muscle and tongue.

== Gene ==
LSMEM2 is also known as c3orf45. It is found at human chromosome loci 3p21 on the plus strand from bases 50,277,907-50,288,116. This gene is 1,434 base pairs long and has four exon regions. Nearby genes include SEMA3B and IFRD2.

== mRNA ==
LSMEM2 has two different isoforms, isoform 1 and 2. These two isoforms encode the same protein. Isoform 2 uses an alternate in-frame splice-site in the 5' coding region in comparison to isoform 1. Isoform 1 is three base pairs and one amino acid longer than isoform 2 at the exon 2 and exon 3 junction.

== Protein ==
The LSMEM2 protein has two isoforms. Isoform 1 has an alanine added after amino acid 57, otherwise the two isoforms are identical. It has a predicted MW of 17.8 kDa and isoelectric point of 5.7 pI. LSMEM2 is predicted to have one transmembrane region which is composed of 50% leucine and considered leucine rich. The N-terminus is predicted to be the cytosolic/intracellular region of the protein, while the C-terminus is predicted as the lumenal/extracellular region. It is found to have one domain, Domain of unknown function 4714 (DUF4714), spanning from amino acid 13 to 161.

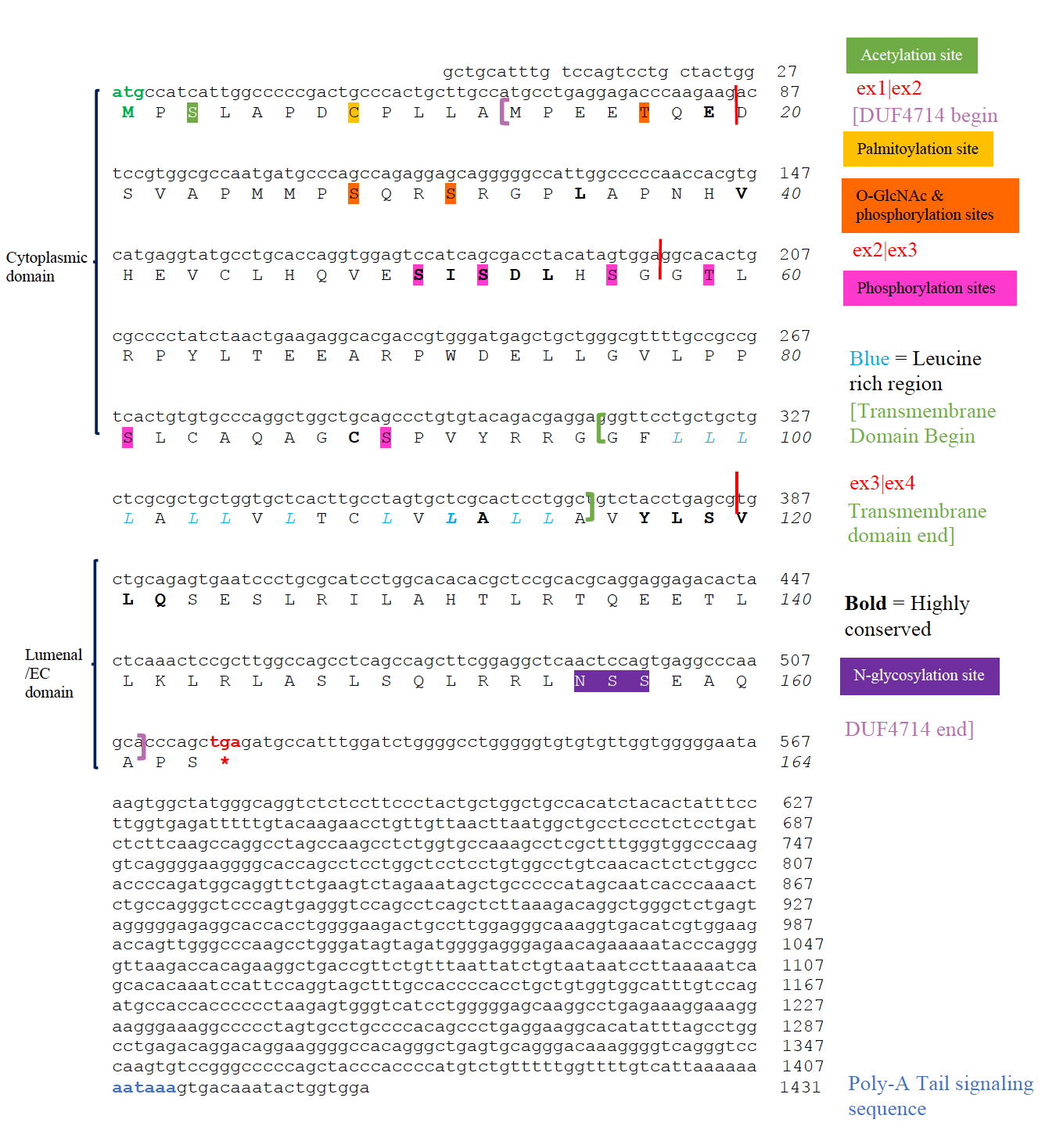
Predicted primary sequence, regions and post-translational modifications of the LSMEM2 protein.

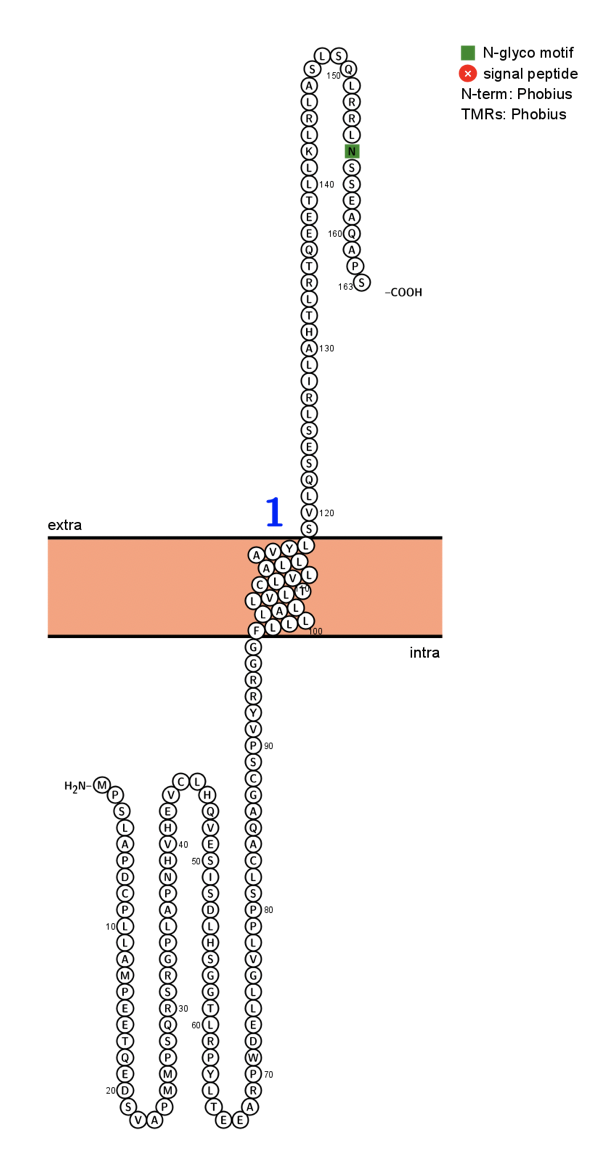
Predicted intracellular/cytoplasmic, transmembrane, and extracellular/lumenal regions of the human LSMEM2 protein.

=== Post-translational Modifications ===
LSMEM2 is predicted to have an acetylation and palmitoylation site near the N-terminus of the protein. It is also predicted to have various phosphorylation and O-GlcNAc sites throughout the predicted intracellular/cytosolic region of the protein. LSMEM2 has a predicted N-glycosylation site at amino acids 155,156, and 157 in the probable extracellular/lumenal region.

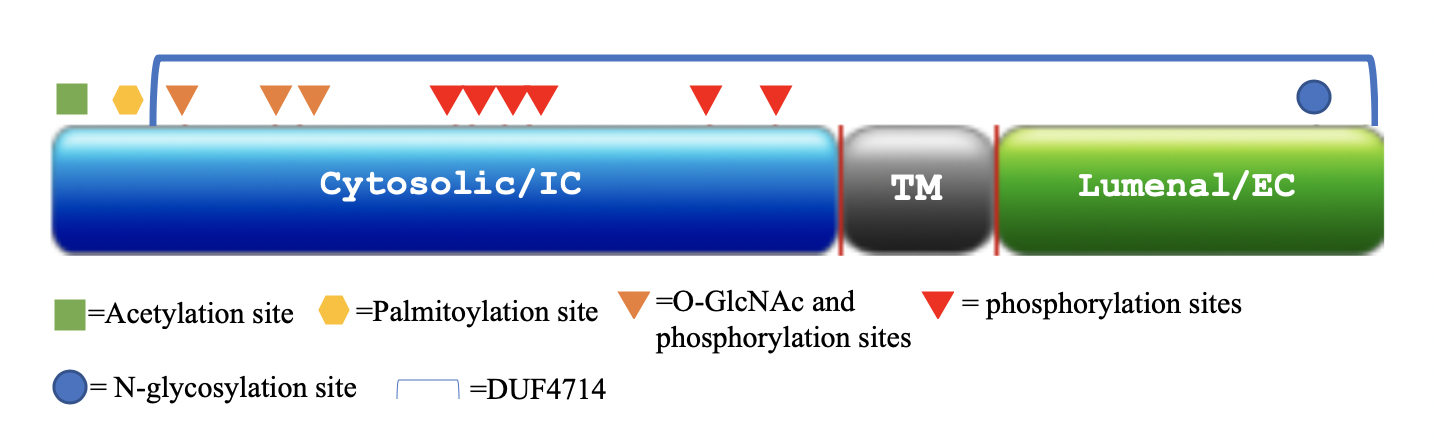
Schematic illustration displaying the predicted regions, domains, and post-translational modifications of the LSMEM2 protein.

=== Structure ===
The secondary and tertiary structure of LSMEM2 are currently unknown. The secondary structure is predicted as largely alpha-helices for the transmembrane and lumenal/extracellular region. The cytoplasmic/intracellular region structure still remains relatively unclear. To the right is a predicted tertiary structure of the human LSMEM2 protein by the I-TASSER software.

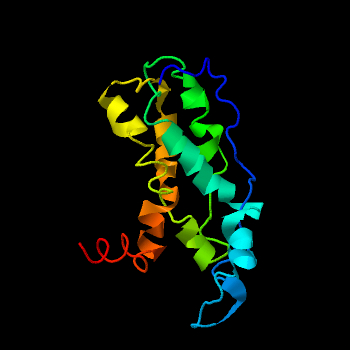
Predicted tertiary structure of the human LSMEM2 protein by I-TASSER. The structure is colored in the order of the rainbow from the N-terminus to the C-terminus.

=== Homology ===
Paralogs

LSMEM2 has no known paralogs.

Orthologs

LSMEM2 has 168 orthologs total, 131 of them being mammals, the other orthologs consist of aves and reptiles The LSMEM2 protein is conserved in mammals with 71.3% chemically-similar sequences. The table below displays features of select orthologs of LSMEM2 of varying evolutionary distance. The predicted transmembrane domain of LSMEM2 is found to be highly conserved in its orthologs.

| Genus and species | Common name | Accession number | Length (amino acids) | Sequence Identity | Sequence Similarity | Date of Divergence (million years ago) |
|---|---|---|---|---|---|---|
| Homo sapiens | Human | NP_001291314.1 | 163 | 100% | 100% | 0 |
| Acinonyx jubatus | Cheetah | XP_014932576 | 149 | 84.11% | 85.30% | 105 |
| Ornithorhynchus anatinus | Platypus | XP_028906032 | 172 | 67.97% | 71.30% | 177 |
| Gallus gallus | Chicken | XP_015148980.1 | 159 | 50.00% | 41.20% | 312 |
| Chrysemys picta | Painted turtle | XP_005308817 | 172 | 39.53% | 44.10% | 312 |

=== Evolution ===
LSMEM2 was found to emerge about 312 million years ago (MYA). It has been found to evolve at an intermediate rate when compared to a quickly evolving protein, Fibronectin, and a slowly evolving protein, Cytochrome C. LSMEM2 is predicted to change 1% every 3.9 million years.

== Expression ==
LSMEM2 is found to be highly expressed in the human heart and skeletal muscle with RNA Sequencing and Microarray data. It is also found to be highly expressed in the heart during human fetal development.

=== Regulation of Expression ===
The promoter region for LSMEM2 is predicted by El Dorado to be the 2,328 basepairs directly upstream from the LSMEM2 gene. A notable transcription factor predicted to bind to this promoter is the Brachyury gene, mesoderm developmental factor. This transcription factor is involved in regulating the development of the notochord.

== Function ==
LSMEM2 has been predicted to be involved in Mitochondrial ATP synthesis coupled proton transport. However, the function of LSMEM2 is still not fully understood by the scientific community.

=== Interacting Proteins ===
LSMEM2 has been found to potentially interact with MEP1B, DEFA6, CYP3A43, TBC1D29, KLHL23, ZNF551, c5orf24, CWH43, and PDIA2.

=== Clinical Significance ===
LSMEM2 was discovered to be down-regulated in the myotubes of patients with FSHD, a form of muscular dystrophy. LSMEM2 was also predicted to be involved in the pathway for sepsis-induced myopathy, although more research is required to determine its exact role
