= Cytochrome P450 aromatic O-demethylase =

Aromatic O-demethylase, cytochrome P450 subunit
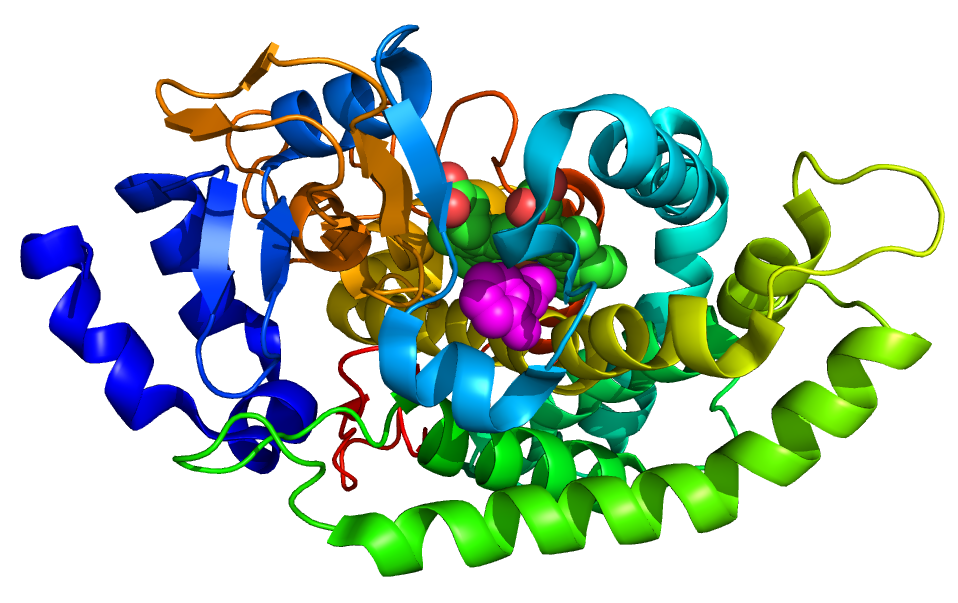
- Crystal structure of gcoA (cartoon diagram) in complex with heme (green spheres) and guaiacol (magenta) based on PDB: 5NCB.

Identifiers
- Organism: Amycolatopsis sp.
- Symbol: gcoA, CYP255A
- Orthologs: OMA: entry
- PDB: 5NCB
- UniProt: P0DPQ7

Other data
- EC number: 1.14.14.-
Search for
- Structures: Swiss-model
- Domains: InterPro

Aromatic O-demethylase, reductase subunit
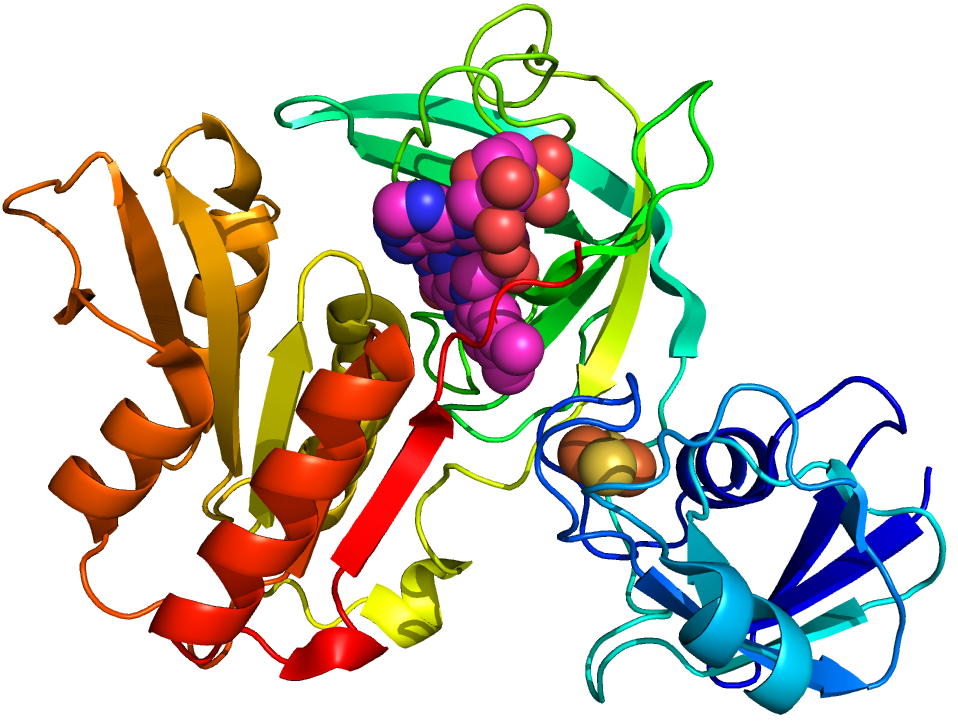
- Crystal structure of gcoB (cartoon diagram) complexed with FAD (magenta spheres) and an iron–sulfur cluster (orange/yellow) based on PDB: 5OGX.

Identifiers
- Organism: Amycolatopsis sp.
- Symbol: gcoB
- Orthologs: OMA: entry
- PDB: 5OGX
- UniProt: P0DPQ8

Other data
- EC number: 1.6.2.-
Search for
- Structures: Swiss-model
- Domains: InterPro

Cytochrome P450 aromatic O-demethylase is a bacterial enzyme that catalyzes the demethylation of lignin and various lignols. The net reaction follows the following stoichiometry, illustrated with a generic methoxy arene:

ArOCH_{3} + O_{2} + 2 e^{−} + 2 H^{+} → ArOH + CH_{2}O + H_{2}O

The enzyme is notable for its promiscuity, affecting the O-demethylation of a range of substrates, including lignin.

It is a heterodimeric protein derived from the products of two genes. The component proteins are a cytochrome P450 enzyme (encoded by the gcoA gene from the family CYP255A) and a three-domain reductase (encoded by the gcoB gene) complexed with three cofactors (2Fe-2S, FAD, and NADH).

A proposed structure of lignin highlighting the pervasiveness of the O-methyl groups.

== Mechanism ==
GcoA and GcoB form a dimer complex in solution. GcoA process the substrate while GcoB provides the electrons to support the mixed function oxidase. As with other P450's, monooxygenation of the substrate proceeds concomitantly with reduction of half an equivalent of O_{2} to water. An oxygen rebound mechanism can be assumed. GcoA positions the aromatic ring within the hydrophobic active site cavity where the heme is located.

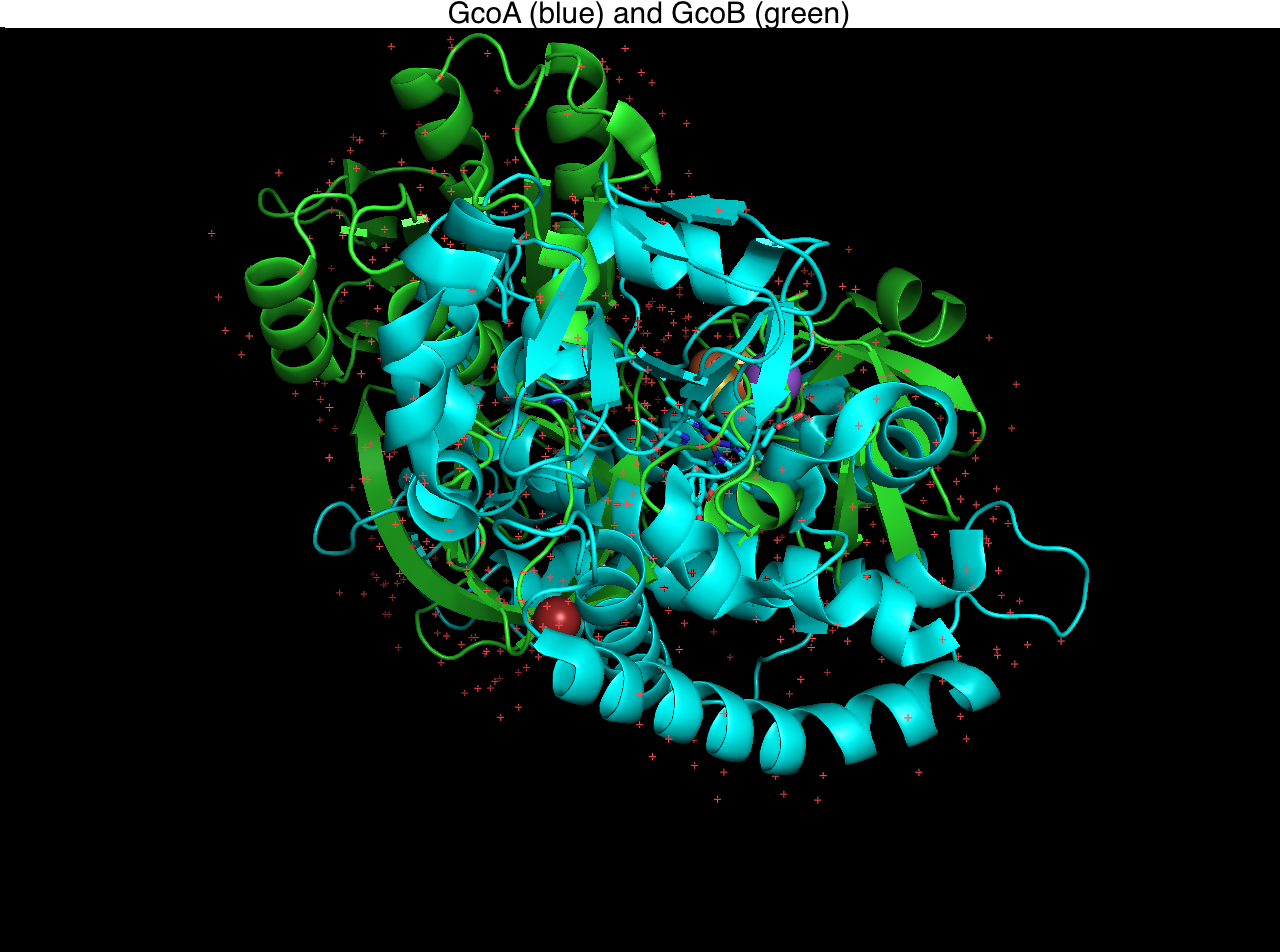
GcoA and GcoB interacting

== Structure ==
GcoA has a typical P450 structure: a thiolate-ligated heme next to a buried active site. GcoB is however unusual. Cytochrome P450s normally are complemented by either a cytochrome P450 reductase or a ferredoxin and ferredoxin reductase; its electrons are carried by NAD+ or NADP+. GcoB however has a single polypeptide. This polypeptide has an N-terminal ferredoxin with both an NAD(P)+ and also an FAD binding region.

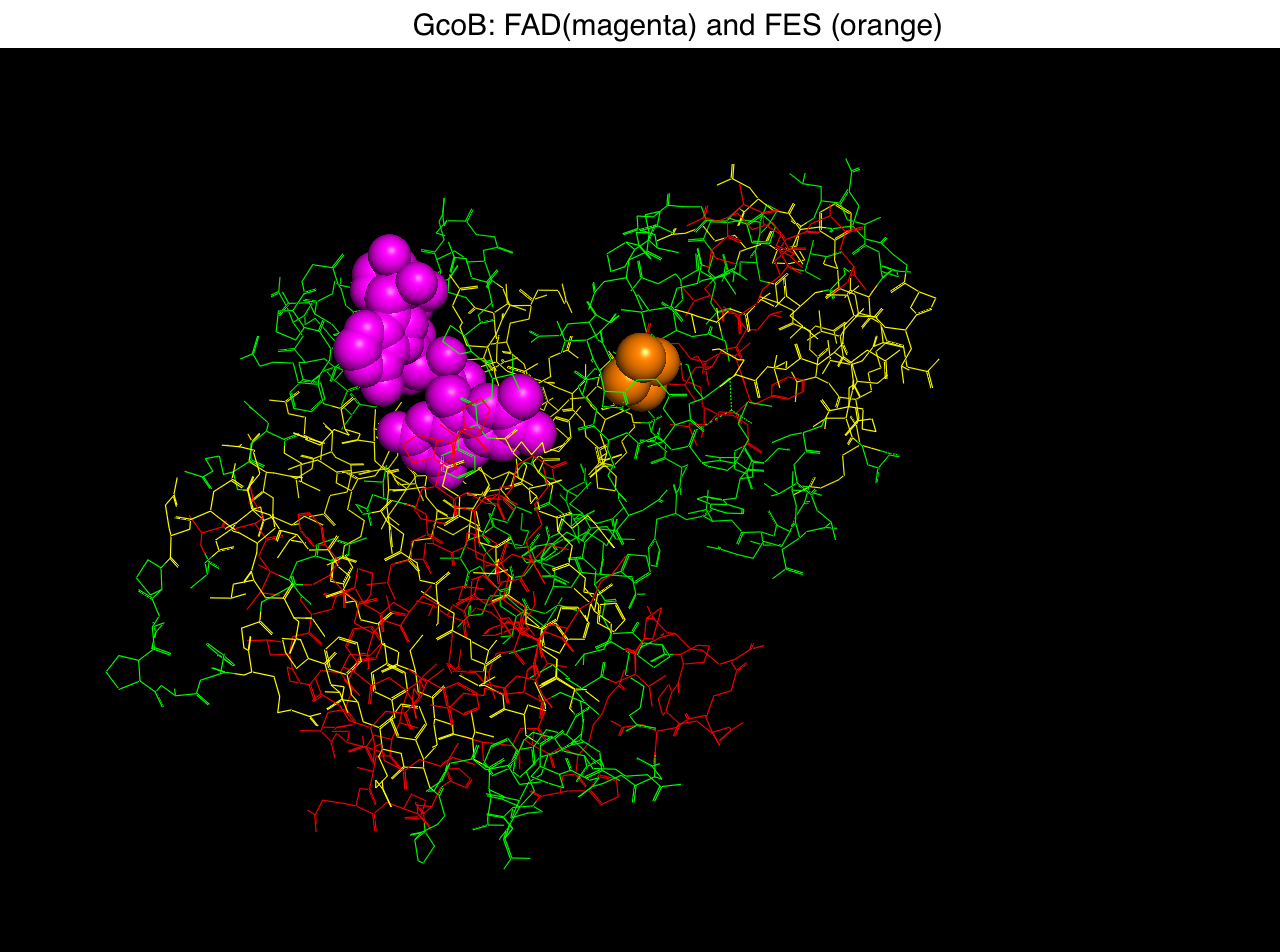
GcoB: FAD relative to FES

CcoA and GcoB are closely interlinked, acting as an heterodimer in solution. The surface of GcoB has an acidic patch that must interact with the matching basic region in GcoA. It is assumed that the part of GcoB interacting with GcoA is at the intersection between the FAD binding domain and ferredoxin domain. To achieve this GcoB would have to go through some structural change, which would represent a new class of P450 systems (family N).

== Potential applications ==
Cytochrome P450 aromatic O-demethylase assists in the partial O-demethylation of lignin. The resulting 1,2-diols are well suited for oxidative degradation via intra- and extra-diol dioxygenases. Thus O-demethylated lignins are potentially susceptible to partial depolymerization. With fewer crosslinks, the modified ligand is potentially more useful than the precursor., ranging from fuels
