= CYP11 family =

Group of cytochrome P450 enzymes

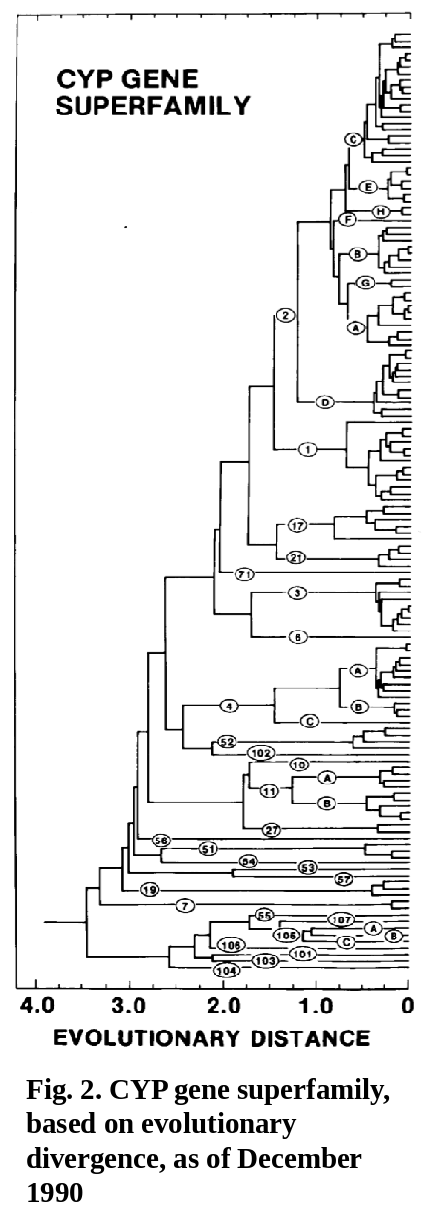
The evolutionary divergence of the CYP superfamily collected in 1990, CYP11, CYP10 and CYP27 are in the same branch, which is now called Mitochondrial clan CYPs.

Cytochrome P450, family 11, also known as CYP11, is a chordate cytochrome P450 monooxygenase family. This family contains many enzymes involved in steroidogenesis, such as Cholesterol side-chain cleavage enzyme (CYP11A1), Steroid 11β-hydroxylase (CYP11B1) and Aldosterone synthase (CYP11B2). CYP11 can be divided into A to E five subfamilies, and CYP11A are the ohonologues to CYP11C, which duplicated during 2R event, and the tetrapod's CYP11B evolved from CYP11C of its fish ancestors, CYP11D and F found in amphioxus. These are not the typical CYP subfamilies, which share at least 40% amino acid identity, members between CYP11A and B subfamily are only 37.5-38.8% identical, and the CYP11D and E genes seen in modern lancelet (Branchiostoma floridae, an ancient branch of chordate animals) is 39% identical to catfish CYP11A1.
