= CYP10 family =

Group of cytochrome P450 enzymes

Cytochrome P450, family 10, also known as CYP10, is a cytochrome P450 family found in Lophotrochozoa belongs to Mitochondrial clan CYPs, which is located in the inner membrane of mitochondria(IMM). The first gene identified in this family is the CYP10A1 from the Lymnaea stagnalis (pond snail), which is highly expressed in the female gonadotropic hormone producing dorsal bodies.
