= CYP4X1 =

Protein found in humans

Identifiers
- Aliases: CYP4X1, CYPIVX1, cytochrome P450 family 4 subfamily X member 1
- External IDs: OMIM: 614999; MGI: 1932403; GeneCards: CYP4X1

Gene location (Human)
Chr.	Chromosome 1 (human)
Band	1p33|1	Start	47,023,669 bp
Band	1p33|1	End	47,050,751 bp

Gene location (Mouse)
Chr.	Chromosome 4 (mouse)
Band	4|4 D1	Start	114,963,520 bp
Band	4|4 D1	End	114,991,478 bp
RNA expression pattern
Bgee	Human / Mouse (ortholog); Top expressed in: palpebral conjunctiva; trachea; bronchial epithelial cell; nasal epithelium; epithelium of nasopharynx; Brodmann area 23; Descending thoracic aorta; urethra; olfactory zone of nasal mucosa; mucosa of paranasal sinus / Top expressed in: facial motor nucleus; lumbar spinal ganglion; substantia nigra; trigeminal ganglion; piriform cortex; dorsomedial hypothalamic nucleus; medial dorsal nucleus; anterior horn of spinal cord; medial geniculate nucleus; temporal lobe; More reference expression data
BioGPS	n/a
Orthologs
Databases	NCBI: entry; OMA: entry
Species	Human	Mouse
Entrez	260293	81906
Ensembl	ENSG00000186377	ENSMUSG00000047155
UniProt	Q8N118	Q6A152
RefSeq (mRNA)	NM_178033; NM_001320289; NM_001320290	NM_001003947
RefSeq (protein)	NP_001307218; NP_001307219; NP_828847	NP_001003947
Location (UCSC)	Chr 1: 47.02 – 47.05 Mb	Chr 4: 114.96 – 114.99 Mb
PubMed search
- Wikidata
View/Edit Human	View/Edit Mouse

CYP4X1 (cytochrome P450, family 4, subfamily X, polypeptide 1) is a protein which in humans is encoded by the CYP4X1 gene.

This gene encodes a member of the cytochrome P450 superfamily of enzymes. The cytochrome P450 proteins are monooxygenases which catalyze many reactions involved in drug metabolism and synthesis of cholesterol, steroids and other lipids. The expression pattern of a similar rat protein suggests that this protein may be involved in neurovascular function in the brain.
