= CYP20A1 =

Protein-coding gene in the species Homo sapiens

Identifiers
- Aliases: CYP20A1, CYP-M, cytochrome P450 family 20 subfamily A member 1
- External IDs: MGI: 1925201; GeneCards: CYP20A1

Gene location (Human)
Chr.	Chromosome 2 (human)
Band	2q33.2	Start	203,238,940 bp
Band	2q33.2	End	203,305,611 bp

Gene location (Mouse)
Chr.	Chromosome 1 (mouse)
Band	1|1 C2	Start	60,382,482 bp
Band	1|1 C2	End	60,427,219 bp
RNA expression pattern
Bgee	Human / Mouse (ortholog); Top expressed in: Achilles tendon; gonad; epithelium of colon; monocyte; islet of Langerhans; testicle; body of pancreas; rectum; right adrenal cortex; left adrenal gland / Top expressed in: umbilical cord; seminal vesicula; calvaria; ureter; cumulus cell; renal corpuscle; left lung lobe; dermis; trigeminal ganglion; interventricular septum; More reference expression data
BioGPS	n/a
Orthologs
Databases	NCBI: entry; OMA: entry
Species	Human	Mouse
Entrez	57404	77951
Ensembl	ENSG00000119004	ENSMUSG00000049439
UniProt	Q6UW02	Q8BKE6
RefSeq (mRNA)	NM_020674; NM_177538	NM_030013; NM_001313721
RefSeq (protein)	NP_803882; NP_001358624; NP_001358625; NP_001358626; NP_001358627 NP_001358628; NP_001358629; NP_001358630; NP_001358631; NP_001358632; NP_001358633; NP_001358634; NP_001358635	NP_001300650; NP_084289
Location (UCSC)	Chr 2: 203.24 – 203.31 Mb	Chr 1: 60.38 – 60.43 Mb
PubMed search
- Wikidata
View/Edit Human	View/Edit Mouse

CYP20A1 (cytochrome P450, family 20, subfamily A, polypeptide 1) is a protein which in humans is encoded by the CYP20A1 gene.

This gene encodes a member of the cytochrome P450 superfamily of enzymes. The cytochrome P450 proteins are monooxygenases that catalyze many reactions involved in pollutant and drug metabolism and the synthesis of cholesterol, steroids, and other lipids. CYP20A1 lacks one amino acid of the conserved heme binding site. It also lacks the conserved I-helix motif AGX(D,E)T, suggesting that its substrate may carry its own oxygen.

CYP20A1 has no identified substrate or biological role and is considered an "orphan" P450.
