= Camphor 5-monooxygenase =

Enzyme

camphor 5-monooxygenase
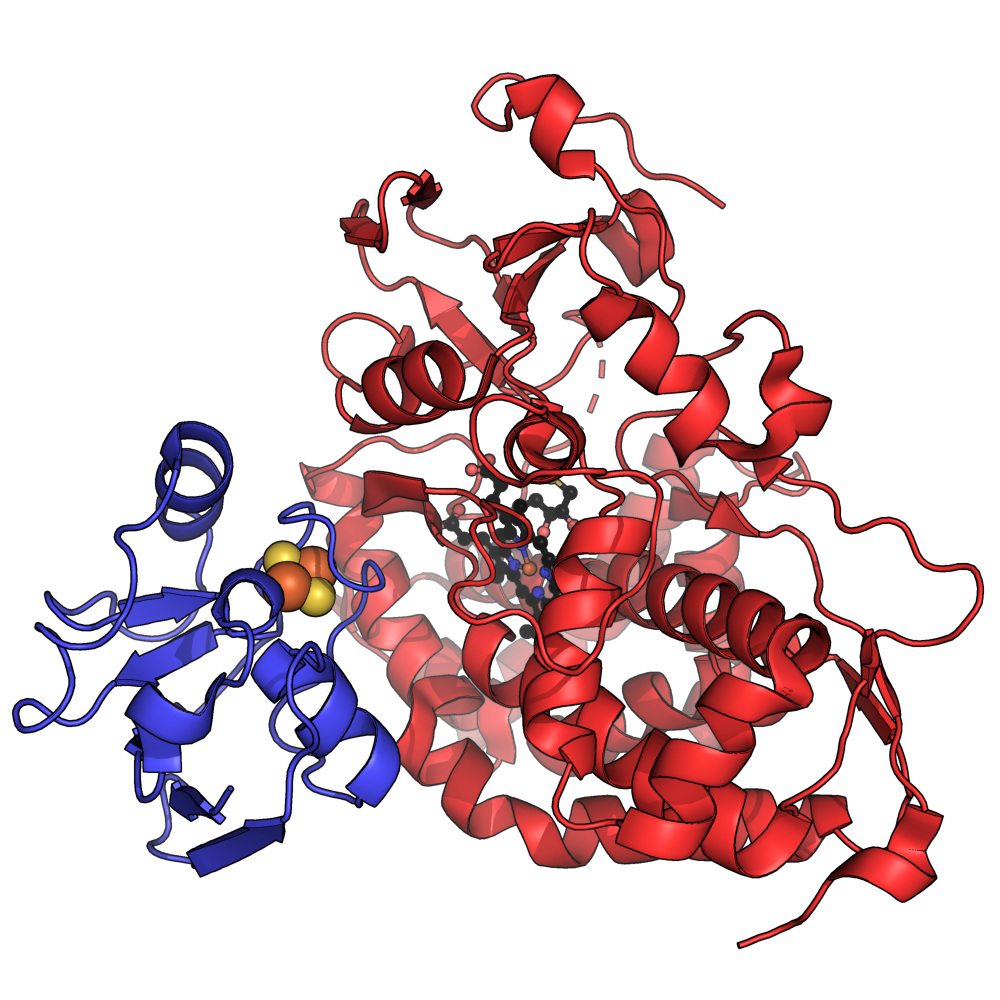
- Catalytic complex between Pseudomonas putida camphor 5-monooxygenase (red) and putidaredoxin (blue) PDB: 5GXG

Identifiers
- EC no.: 1.14.15.1
- CAS no.: 9030-82-4

Databases
- IntEnz: IntEnz view
- BRENDA: BRENDA entry
- ExPASy: NiceZyme view
- KEGG: KEGG entry
- MetaCyc: metabolic pathway
- PRIAM: profile
- PDB structures: RCSB PDB PDBe PDBsum
- Gene Ontology: AmiGO / QuickGO
Search
- PMC: articles
- PubMed: articles
- NCBI: proteins

In enzymology, a camphor 5-monooxygenase (EC 1.14.15.1) is an enzyme that catalyzes the chemical reaction

(+)-camphor + putidaredoxin + O_{2} $\rightleftharpoons$ (+)-exo-5-hydroxycamphor + oxidized putidaredoxin + H_{2}O

The 3 substrates of this enzyme are (+)-camphor, putidaredoxin, and O_{2}, whereas its 3 products are (+)-exo-5-hydroxycamphor, oxidized putidaredoxin, and H_{2}O.

This enzyme belongs to the family of oxidoreductases, specifically those acting on paired donors, with O_{2} as oxidant and incorporation or reduction of oxygen. The oxygen incorporated need not be derived from O_{2} with reduced iron-sulfur protein as one donor, and incorporation of one atom of oxygen into the other donor. The systematic name of this enzyme class is (+)-camphor,reduced putidaredoxin:oxygen oxidoreductase (5-hydroxylating). Other names in common use include camphor 5-exo-methylene hydroxylase, 2-bornanone 5-exo-hydroxylase, bornanone 5-exo-hydroxylase, camphor 5-exo-hydroxylase, camphor 5-exohydroxylase, camphor hydroxylase, d-camphor monooxygenase, methylene hydroxylase, methylene monooxygenase, D-camphor-exo-hydroxylase, and camphor methylene hydroxylase. It employs one cofactor, heme.

== Structural studies ==
As of late 2007, 58 structures have been solved for this class of enzymes, with PDB accession codes 1AKD, 1C8J, 1CP4, 1GEB, 1GEK, 1GEM, 1GJM, 1IWI, 1IWJ, 1IWK, 1J51, 1K2O, 1LWL, 1MPW, 1NOO, 1O76, 1P2Y, 1P7R, 1PHA, 1PHB, 1PHC, 1PHD, 1PHE, 1PHF, 1PHG, 1QMQ, 1RE9, 1RF9, 1T85, 1T86, 1T87, 1T88, 1YRC, 1YRD, 2A1M, 2A1N, 2A1O, 2CP4, 2CPP, 2FE6, 2FER, 2FEU, 2FRZ, 2GQX, 2GR6, 2H7Q, 2H7R, 2H7S, 3CP4, 3CPP, 4CP4, 4CPP, 5CP4, 5CPP, 6CP4, 6CPP, 7CPP, and 8CPP.

== Examples ==
Camphor 5-monooxygenase

Identifiers
- Organism: Pseudomonas putida
- Symbol: camC
- Alt. symbols: cyp101
- UniProt: P00183

Other data
- EC number: 1.14.15.1
Search for
- Structures: Swiss-model
- Domains: InterPro

Putidaredoxin

Identifiers
- Organism: Pseudomonas putida
- Symbol: camB
- Alt. symbols: PDX
- UniProt: P00259
Search for
- Structures: Swiss-model
- Domains: InterPro

Putidaredoxin reductase CamA

Identifiers
- Organism: Pseudomonas putida
- Symbol: camA
- Alt. symbols: Pdr
- UniProt: P16640

Other data
- EC number: 1.18.1.5
Search for
- Structures: Swiss-model
- Domains: InterPro

Cytochrome P450 camphor 5-monooxygenase is a bacterial enzyme originally from Pseudomonas putida, which catalyzes a critical step in the metabolism of camphor. In 1987, Cytochrome P450cam was the first cytochrome P450 three-dimensional protein structure solved by X-ray crystallography.

It is a heterotrimeric protein derived from the products of three genes: a cytochrome P450 enzyme (encoded by the CamC gene from the CYP family CYP101), a Putidaredoxin (encoded by the CamB gene) complexed with cofactors 2Fe-2S, a NADH-dependent Putidaredoxin reductase (encoded by the CamA gene).
