= Bietti's crystalline dystrophy =

Bietti's Crystalline Dystrophy
- Other names: Bietti crystalline corneoretinal dystrophy
- Bietti's crystalline dystrophy has an autosomal recessive pattern of inheritance.
- Specialty: Ophthalmology

Bietti's crystalline dystrophy (BCD) is a rare autosomal recessive eye disease named after G. B. Bietti.

BCD is a rare disease and appears to be more common in people with Asian ancestry.

== Presentation ==
Symptoms of BCD include:

- Crystals in the cornea (the clear covering of the eye)
- Yellow, shiny deposits on the retina
- Progressive atrophy of the retina, choriocapillaries and choroid (the back layers of the eye). This tends to lead to progressive night blindness and visual field constriction.

== Genetics ==
BCD is inherited in an autosomal recessive manner. This means the defective gene responsible for the disorder is located on an autosome, and two copies of the defective gene (one inherited from each parent) are required in order to be born with the disorder. The parents of an individual with an autosomal recessive disorder both carry one copy of the defective gene, but usually do not experience any signs or symptoms of the disorder.

BCD is associated with mutations in the CYP4V2 gene. The nematode C. elegans has a duplicated gene (cyp31A2 and cyp31A3) that are orthologous of the human gene. These genes code for cytochrome P450s involved in fatty acid synthesis.

== Treatment ==
At this time, there is no treatment for BCD. Genetic studies are being conducted to find treatments for patients with BCD.
