= Vitamin D3 dihydroxylase =

Identifiers
- Organism: Streptomyces griseolus
- Symbol: CYP105A1
- Alt. symbols: VD3 hydroxylase, Cytochrome P450-SU1
- Orthologs: OMA: entry
- UniProt: P18326

Other data
- EC number: 1.14.15.22
Search for
- Structures: Swiss-model
- Domains: InterPro

Vitamin D3 dihydroxylase is a cytochrome P450 enzyme purified from the actinobacterium Streptomyces griseolus, with EC number EC 1.14.15.22 and CYP Symbol CYP105A1 (Cytochrome P450, family 105, member A1), catalyses oxidation of cholecalciferol(vitamin D3) to calcitriol.
