= Xenobiotic-sensing receptor =

Receptor that binds xenobiotics

A xenobiotic-sensing receptor is a receptor that binds xenobiotics. They include the following nuclear receptors:

- Constitutive androstane receptor (CAR)
- Pregnane X receptor (PXR)

Xenobiotic receptors recognize the foreign chemicals and trigger detoxification and metabolism pathways in different host tissues. CAR and PXR are xenobiotic receptors and they both are members of NR1I nuclear receptor family. The regulate the metabolic pathway for the elimination of cholesterol. No physiological ligands were known as of 2010, but this does not imply a true lack of known endogenous ligands.

The aryl hydrocarbon receptor also senses xenobiotics and induces metabolic enzymes, but it is largely not considered a xenobiotic-sensing receptor due to not being a nuclear receptor. It also has many other functions (signaling in development, immune response, etc.).

== Functions ==
Several genes involved in cytochrome P450, phase I, and glucuronosyltransferases conjugation catalysis in phase II are regulated by phenobarbital(PB) as well the transport mediated pathways of drug elimination. Induction of PB in xenobiotic-metabolizes of cytochromes CYP2b undergoes a transcriptional process, thus raising mRNA levels. Expression of the CAR summarized in a UniGene database, mainly in the kidney, liver, sometimes in the heart, GI tissues, and the human brain tissues. PB in the past ten years has been shown as an enhancer that is responsive to human(PBREM), rat(CYP2B), and the mouse; Constitutive Activated Receptor(CAR) identified was depicted to bind DR-4 motifs. The circulating thyroid hormone levels can be regulated by CAR. TH pathways of conjugation can be induced in PB treatment in a way that can lead to reductions that are fast-induced in T4 levels and serum triiodothyronine and finished serum thyroxine(T4).

Phase II and I enzymes PXR carries out induction. Expression of PXR is mainly evident in the liver, testis, human embryonic tissues, GI tract, and liver of the mouse. Research carried out on macrolide antibiotics, and glucocorticoids induction of CYP3A were perceived to utilize glucocorticoid receptor. This was explained by the induction of the CYP3A relationships obtained from the steroid structure-activity evaluation results. Research conducted in 1998 said that PXR was responsible for the induction of CYP3A and differences in the species in the induction of CYP3A by RIF and PCN. Based on this and other investigations, PXR has been perceived as a xenobiotic regulation mediator of CYP3A.

CAR has been depicted to be linked with a cofactor transcriptional induced by homeostasis energy regulation and fasting. Hemostasis of BA also aids in keeping the correct cholesterol levels. CAR can also impact gluconeogenesis regulation mediated by a transcription factor; the transcription factor binding can be regulated to Insulin Response Sequence(IRS). PXR protects the body from bile acid toxicity. Regarding the cholesterol levels regulation by CAR, PXR-null mice pretreatment using TCPOBOP does not reduce danger to cholesterol; therefore, toxicity from cholesterol can be controlled using PXR.
