= CYP170B1 =

Cytochrome P450 enzyme

Identifiers
- Organism: Streptomyces albus
- Symbol: CYP170B1

Cytochrome P450 family 170 subfamily B member 1 (abbreviated CYP170B1) is an actinobacterial Cytochrome P450 enzyme originally from Streptomyces albus, which catalyzes the biosynthesis of the tricyclic sesquiterpene antibiotic albaflavenone.
