= CYP39A1 =

Protein-coding gene in the species Homo sapiens

Identifiers
- Aliases: CYP39A1, cytochrome P450 family 39 subfamily A member 1
- External IDs: OMIM: 605994; MGI: 1927096; GeneCards: CYP39A1
Enzyme activity
EC #	BRENDA	ExPASy	KEGG	MetaCyc
1.14.14.26	↗	↗	↗	↗

Gene location (Human)
Chr.	Chromosome 6 (human)
Band	6p12.3	Start	46,549,580 bp
Band	6p12.3	End	46,652,830 bp

Gene location (Mouse)
Chr.	Chromosome 17 (mouse)
Band	17|17 B3	Start	43,978,316 bp
Band	17|17 B3	End	44,062,322 bp
RNA expression pattern
Bgee	Human / Mouse (ortholog); Top expressed in: parotid gland; right lobe of liver; gastric mucosa; skin of abdomen; testicle; hair follicle; gonad; Epithelium of choroid plexus; corpus epididymis; skin of leg / Top expressed in: sciatic nerve; vestibular sensory epithelium; zygote; vestibular membrane of cochlear duct; lacrimal gland; ventricular zone; secondary oocyte; respiratory epithelium; olfactory epithelium; tail of embryo; More reference expression data
BioGPS	n/a
Gene ontology
Molecular function	iron ion binding; metal ion binding; monooxygenase activity; steroid 7-alpha-hydroxylase activity; heme binding; oxidoreductase activity, acting on paired donors, with incorporation or reduction of molecular oxygen; oxidoreductase activity; oxysterol 7-alpha-hydroxylase activity
Cellular component	organelle membrane; endoplasmic reticulum membrane; intracellular membrane-bounded organelle; membrane; endoplasmic reticulum
Biological process	steroid metabolic process; lipid metabolism; digestion; bile acid catabolic process; cholesterol catabolic process; lipid catabolic process; sterol metabolic process; bile acid biosynthetic process; cholesterol homeostasis
Sources:Amigo / QuickGO
Orthologs
Databases	NCBI: entry; OMA: entry
Species	Human	Mouse
Entrez	51302	56050
Ensembl	ENSG00000146233	ENSMUSG00000023963
UniProt	Q9NYL5	Q9JKJ9
RefSeq (mRNA)	NM_001278738; NM_001278739; NM_016593	NM_001285947; NM_001285948; NM_018887
RefSeq (protein)	NP_001265667; NP_001265668; NP_057677	NP_001272876; NP_001272877; NP_061375
Location (UCSC)	Chr 6: 46.55 – 46.65 Mb	Chr 17: 43.98 – 44.06 Mb
PubMed search
- Wikidata
View/Edit Human	View/Edit Mouse

CYP39A1 (cytochrome P450, family 39, subfamily A, polypeptide 1) also known as oxysterol 7-α-hydroxylase 2 is a protein that in humans is encoded by the CYP39A1 gene.

This gene encodes a member of the cytochrome P450 superfamily of enzymes. The cytochrome P450 proteins are monooxygenases which catalyze many reactions involved in drug metabolism and synthesis of cholesterol, steroids and other lipids. This endoplasmic reticulum protein is involved in the conversion of cholesterol to bile acids. Its substrates include the oxysterols 24-hydroxycholesterol, 25-hydroxycholesterol and 27-hydroxycholesterol.
