= CYP4Z1 =

Protein found in humans

Identifiers
- Aliases: CYP4Z1, CYP4A20, cytochrome P450 family 4 subfamily Z member 1
- External IDs: GeneCards: CYP4Z1
Enzyme activity
EC #	BRENDA	ExPASy	KEGG	MetaCyc
1.14.14.1	↗	↗	↗	↗
1.14.14.130	↗	↗	↗	↗

Gene location (Human)
Chr.	Chromosome 1 (human)
Band	1p33	Start	47,067,231 bp
Band	1p33	End	47,118,318 bp
RNA expression pattern
Bgee	Human / Mouse (ortholog); Top expressed in: testicle; Achilles tendon; tibial nerve; pancreatic ductal cell; bronchial epithelial cell; right lung; lactiferous gland; buccal mucosa cell; olfactory zone of nasal mucosa; right uterine tube / n/a; More reference expression data
BioGPS	n/a
Orthologs
Databases	NCBI: entry; OMA: entry
Species	Human	Mouse
Entrez	199974	n/a
Ensembl	ENSG00000186160	n/a
UniProt	Q86W10	n/a
RefSeq (mRNA)	NM_178134	n/a
RefSeq (protein)	NP_835235	n/a
Location (UCSC)	Chr 1: 47.07 – 47.12 Mb	n/a
PubMed search		n/a
- Wikidata
View/Edit Human

CYP4Z1 (cytochrome P450, family 4, subfamily Z, polypeptide 1) is a protein that in humans is encoded by the CYP4Z1 gene.

== Function ==
This gene encodes a member of the cytochrome P450 superfamily of enzymes. The cytochrome P450 proteins are monooxygenases which catalyze many reactions involved in drug metabolism and synthesis of cholesterol, steroids and other lipids. This gene is part of a cluster of cytochrome P450 genes on chromosome 1p33.

== Clinical significance ==
CYP4Z1 is overexpressed in breast cancer cells. It has also been demonstrated that the expression of the CYP4Z1 gene is upregulated by activated glucocorticoid and progesterone receptors. The overexpression of CYP4Z1 is associated with the breast cancer cells' increased production of 20-Hydroxyeicosatetraenoic acid (20-HETE); it is hypothesized that CYP4Z1 metabolizes arachidonic acid to 20-HETE and that this overproduction is responsible for increasing the growth and spread of breast cancer cells in human breast cancer. CPZ4Z1 is likewise overexpressed in ovarian cancer cells. These studies also suggest that CYP4Z1 will be a valuable marker to distinguish between benign and malignant breast and ovarian growths in humans and/or the prognoses of malignant growths in these tissues.
