= CYP2A7 =

Protein-coding gene in the species Homo sapiens

Identifiers
- Aliases: CYP2A7, CPA7, CPAD, CYP2A, CYPIIA7, P450-IIA4, cytochrome P450 family 2 subfamily A member 7
- External IDs: OMIM: 608054; MGI: 88597; GeneCards: CYP2A7
Enzyme activity
EC #	BRENDA	ExPASy	KEGG	MetaCyc
1.14.14.1	↗	↗	↗	↗

Gene location (Mouse)
Chr.	Chromosome 7 (mouse)
Band	7 A3|7 15.54 cM	Start	26,534,730 bp
Band	7 A3|7 15.54 cM	End	26,542,973 bp
RNA expression pattern
Bgee	Human / Mouse (ortholog); Top expressed in: liver; right lobe of liver; vagina; myometrium; sural nerve; stromal cell of endometrium; canal of the cervix; right lung; corpus callosum; superior frontal gyrus / Top expressed in: proximal tubule; human kidney; right kidney; hepatobiliary system; liver; esophagus; respiratory epithelium; thymus; nasal epithelium; olfactory epithelium; More reference expression data
BioGPS	n/a
Gene ontology
Molecular function	monooxygenase activity; oxidoreductase activity, acting on paired donors, with incorporation or reduction of molecular oxygen; oxidoreductase activity, acting on paired donors, with incorporation or reduction of molecular oxygen, reduced flavin or flavoprotein as one donor, and incorporation of one atom of oxygen; aromatase activity; heme binding; metal ion binding; iron ion binding; oxidoreductase activity; oxygen binding; arachidonic acid epoxygenase activity; steroid hydroxylase activity
Cellular component	membrane; intracellular membrane-bounded organelle; endoplasmic reticulum membrane; organelle membrane; endoplasmic reticulum; cytoplasm
Biological process	epoxygenase P450 pathway; organic acid metabolic process; xenobiotic metabolic process; coumarin metabolic process
Sources:Amigo / QuickGO
Orthologs
Databases	NCBI: entry
Species	Human	Mouse
Entrez	1549	13087
Ensembl	n/a	ENSMUSG00000005547
UniProt	P20853	P20852
RefSeq (mRNA)	NM_000764; NM_030589	NM_007812
RefSeq (protein)	NP_000755; NP_085079	n/a
Location (UCSC)	n/a	Chr 7: 26.53 – 26.54 Mb
PubMed search
- Wikidata
View/Edit Human	View/Edit Mouse

CYP2A7 (cytochrome P450, family 2, subfamily A, polypeptide 7) is a protein that in humans is encoded by the CYP2A7 gene.

This gene encodes a member of the cytochrome P450 superfamily of enzymes. The cytochrome P450 proteins are monooxygenases which catalyze many reactions involved in drug metabolism and synthesis of cholesterol, steroids and other lipids. This protein localizes to the endoplasmic reticulum; its substrate has not yet been determined. This gene, which produces two transcript variants, is part of a large cluster of cytochrome P450 genes from the CYP2A, CYP2B and CYP2F subfamilies on chromosome 19q.
