= CYP119A1 =

Enzyme

Identifiers
- Organism: Sulfolobus solfataricus
- Symbol: CYP119A1

Cytochrome P450 family 119 subfamily A member 1 (abbreviated CYP119A1) is an Archaeal Cytochrome P450 enzyme originally from the thermophillic archea Sulfolobus solfataricus. Because this enzyme usually has the maximum activity at high temperature and low activity at room temperature, it is often used in the study of enzyme catalytic mechanism.
