= CYP2C18 =

Protein-coding gene in the species Homo sapiens

Identifiers
- Aliases: CYP2C18, CPCI, CYP2C, CYP2C17, P450-6B/29C, P450IIC17, cytochrome P450 family 2 subfamily C member 18
- External IDs: OMIM: 601131; MGI: 1919332; GeneCards: CYP2C18
Available structures
PDB	Ortholog search: PDBe RCSB
PDB	List of PDB id codes 2CIK, 2H6P
Enzyme activity
EC #	BRENDA	ExPASy	KEGG	MetaCyc
1.14.14.1	↗	↗	↗	↗

Gene location (Human)
Chr.	Chromosome 10 (human)
Band	10q23.33	Start	94,683,729 bp
Band	10q23.33	End	94,736,190 bp

Gene location (Mouse)
Chr.	Chromosome 19 (mouse)
Band	19|19 C3	Start	38,995,463 bp
Band	19|19 C3	End	39,031,137 bp
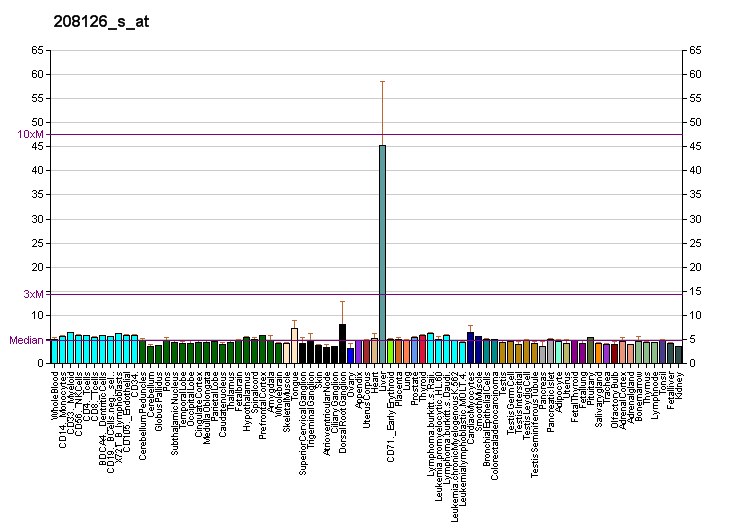

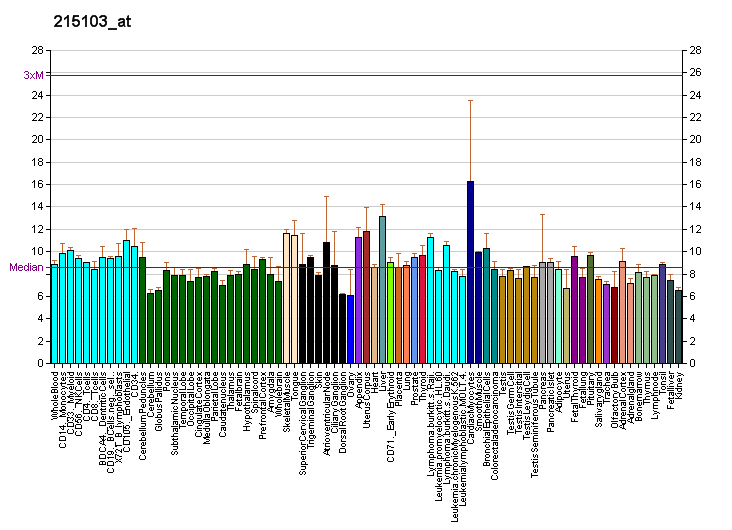
RNA expression pattern
Bgee	Human / Mouse (ortholog); Top expressed in: jejunal mucosa; pancreatic ductal cell; mucosa of ileum; right lobe of liver; duodenum; oral cavity; gums; gingival epithelium; mucosa of pharynx; gallbladder / Top expressed in: left colon; duodenum; jejunum; intestinal villus; left lobe of liver; spermatocyte; spermatid; embryo; embryo; seminiferous tubule; More reference expression data
BioGPS	More reference expression data
Gene ontology
Molecular function	oxidoreductase activity, acting on paired donors, with incorporation or reduction of molecular oxygen; aromatase activity; iron ion binding; oxidoreductase activity; monooxygenase activity; heme binding; oxygen binding; arachidonic acid epoxygenase activity; metal ion binding; steroid hydroxylase activity; oxidoreductase activity, acting on paired donors, with incorporation or reduction of molecular oxygen, reduced flavin or flavoprotein as one donor, and incorporation of one atom of oxygen
Cellular component	endoplasmic reticulum membrane; organelle membrane; intracellular membrane-bounded organelle; membrane; endoplasmic reticulum; cytoplasm
Biological process	epoxygenase P450 pathway; xenobiotic metabolic process; organic acid metabolic process
Sources:Amigo / QuickGO
Orthologs
Databases	NCBI: entry; OMA: entry
Species	Human	Mouse
Entrez	1562	72082
Ensembl	ENSG00000108242	ENSMUSG00000025002
UniProt	P33260	Q9D816
RefSeq (mRNA)	NM_001128925; NM_000772	NM_028089
RefSeq (protein)	NP_000763; NP_001122397	NP_082365
Location (UCSC)	Chr 10: 94.68 – 94.74 Mb	Chr 19: 39 – 39.03 Mb
PubMed search
- Wikidata
View/Edit Human	View/Edit Mouse

Cytochrome P450 2C18 is a protein that in humans is encoded by the CYP2C18 gene.

== Function ==
This gene encodes a member of the cytochrome P450 superfamily of enzymes. The cytochrome P450 proteins are monooxygenases which catalyze many reactions involved in drug metabolism and synthesis of cholesterol, steroids and other lipids. This protein localizes to the endoplasmic reticulum but its specific substrate has not yet been determined. The gene is located within a cluster of cytochrome P450 genes on chromosome 10q24. An additional gene, CYP2C17, was once thought to exist; however, CYP4217 is now considered an artefact based on a chimera of CYP2C18 and CYP2C19.

CYP2C18 also possesses epoxygenase activity: it can attack various long-chain polyunsaturated fatty acids at their double (i.e. alkene) bonds to form epoxide products that act as signaling agents. It metabolizes: 1) arachidonic acid to various epoxyeicosatrienoic acids (also termed EETs); 2) linoleic acid to 9,10-epoxy octadecenoic acids (also termed vernolic acid, linoleic acid 9:10-oxide, or leukotoxin) and 12,13-epoxy-octadecenoic (also termed coronaric acid, linoleic acid 12,13-oxide, or isoleukotoxin); 3) docosahexaenoic acid to various epoxydocosapentaenoic acids (also termed EDPs); and 4) eicosapentaenoic acid to various epoxyeicosatetraenoic acids (also termed EEQs).

While CYP2C19, CYP2C8, CYP2C9, CYP2J2, and possibly CYP2S1 are the main producers of EETs and, very likely EEQs, EDPs, and the epoxides of linoleic acid, CYP2C18 may contribute to the production of these metabolites in certain tissues.
