= CYP4V2 =

Protein-coding gene in the species Homo sapiens

Identifiers
- Aliases: CYP4V2, BCD, CYP4AH1, cytochrome P450 family 4 subfamily V member 2
- External IDs: OMIM: 608614; MGI: 2142763; GeneCards: CYP4V2
Enzyme activity
| EC # | BRENDA | ExPASy | KEGG | MetaCyc |
|---|---|---|---|---|
| 1.14.14.79 | ↗ | ↗ | ↗ | ↗ |
| 1.14.14.80 | ↗ | ↗ | ↗ | ↗ |

Gene location (Human)
| Chr. | Chromosome 4 (human) |
| Band | 4q35.1-q35.2 | Start | 186,191,567 bp |
| Band | 4q35.1-q35.2 | End | 186,213,463 bp |

Gene location (Mouse)
| Chr. | Chromosome 8 (mouse) |
| Band | 8|8 B1.1 | Start | 45,757,981 bp |
| Band | 8|8 B1.1 | End | 45,786,253 bp |
RNA expression pattern
| Bgee | Human / Mouse (ortholog); Top expressed in: mucosa of ileum; liver; pancreatic epithelial cell; right lobe of liver; jejunal mucosa; retinal pigment epithelium; cardiac muscle tissue of right atrium; islet of Langerhans; gallbladder; right adrenal cortex / Top expressed in: left lobe of liver; jejunum; intestinal villus; epithelium of lens; Ileal epithelium; duodenum; Paneth cell; olfactory epithelium; vestibular membrane of cochlear duct; sciatic nerve; More reference expression data |
| BioGPS | n/a |
Gene ontology
| Molecular function | metal ion binding; iron ion binding; oxidoreductase activity; heme binding; oxidoreductase activity, acting on paired donors, with incorporation or reduction of molecular oxygen; monooxygenase activity |
| Cellular component | integral component of membrane; endoplasmic reticulum membrane; endoplasmic reticulum; membrane |
| Biological process | response to stimulus; sterol metabolic process; fatty acid omega-oxidation; visual perception; retinoid metabolic process; lipid metabolism |
Sources:Amigo / QuickGO
Orthologs
| Databases | NCBI: entry; OMA: entry |
| Species | Human | Mouse |
| Entrez | 285440 | 102294 |
| Ensembl | ENSG00000145476 | ENSMUSG00000079057 |
| UniProt | Q6ZWL3 | Q9DBW0 |
| RefSeq (mRNA) | NM_207352 | NM_133969 |
| RefSeq (protein) | NP_997235 | NP_598730 |
| Location (UCSC) | Chr 4: 186.19 – 186.21 Mb | Chr 8: 45.76 – 45.79 Mb |
| PubMed search |
- Wikidata
| View/Edit Human | View/Edit Mouse |

Cytochrome P450 4V2 is a protein that in humans is encoded by the CYP4V2 gene.

Mutations are associated with Bietti's crystalline dystrophy and retinitis pigmentosas.
