= CYP105 family =

Group of cytochrome P450 enzymes

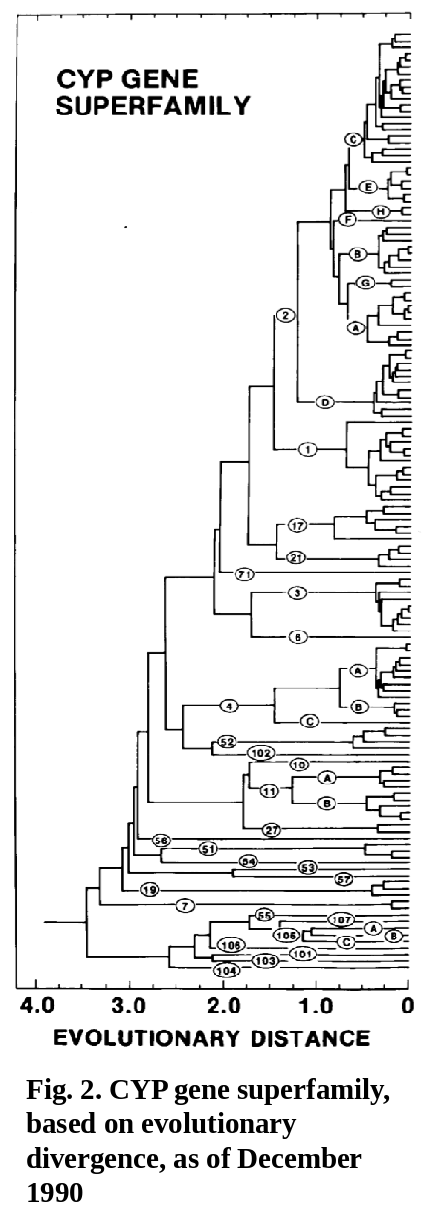
The evolutionary divergence of the CYP superfamily collected in 1990, CYP105A, B and C is in the branch of prokaryotic CYPs

Cytochrome P450, family 105, also known as CYP105, is a cytochrome P450 monooxygenase family in bacteria, predominantly found in the phylum Actinomycetota and the order Actinomycetales. The first three genes and subfamilies identified in this family is the herbicide-inducible P-450SU1 (CYP105A1, subfamily A) and P-450SU2 (CYP105B1, subfamily B) from Streptomyces griseolus and choP (CYP105C1, subfamily C) from Streptomyces sp's cholesterol oxidase promoter region.

== Subfamily ==
Subfamily	first gene identified	Species	REF
A	SU1 (CYP105A1)	Streptomyces griseolus	
B	SU2 (CYP105B1)	Streptomyces griseolus	
C	choP (CYP105C1)	Streptomyces sp	
D	soyC (CYP105D1)	Streptomyces griseus	
E	ORF1 (CYP105E1)	Rhodococcus fascians	

== Application ==
CYP105 enzymes is widely used in industry, such as the production of pravastatin.
