= Cytochrome P450 BM3 =

Enzyme

Bifunctional cytochrome P450/NADPH--P450 reductase

Identifiers
- Organism: Bacillus megaterium
- Symbol: P450BM3
- Alt. symbols: CYP102A1
- Orthologs: OMA: entry
- PDB: 2IJ2
- RefSeq (mRNA): NZ_JJMH01000056.1
- RefSeq (Prot): WP_034650526.1
- UniProt: P14779

Other data
- EC number: 1.6.2.4
Search for
- Structures: Swiss-model
- Domains: InterPro

Cytochrome P450 BM3 is a Prokaryote Cytochrome P450 enzyme originally from Bacillus megaterium catalyzes the hydroxylation of several long-chain fatty acids at the ω–1 through ω–3 positions. This bacterial enzyme belongs to CYP family CYP102, with the CYP Symbol CYP102A1.This CYP family constitutes a natural fusion between the CYP domain and an NADPH-dependent cytochrome P450 reductase.
