= Oxygen rebound mechanism =

Catalytic pathway

In biochemistry, the oxygen rebound mechanism is the pathway for hydroxylation of organic compounds by iron-containing oxygenases. Many enzymes effect the hydroxylation of hydrocarbons as a means for biosynthesis, detoxification, gene regulation, and other functions. These enzymes often utilize Fe-O centers that convert C-H bonds into C-OH groups. The oxygen rebound mechanism starts with abstraction of H from the hydrocarbon, giving an organic radical and an iron hydroxide. In the rebound step, the organic radical attacks the Fe-OH center to give an alcohol group, which is bound to Fe as a ligand. Dissociation of the alcohol from the metal allows the cycle to start anew. This mechanistic scenario is an alternative to the direct insertion of an O center into a C-H bond. The pathway is an example of C-H activation.

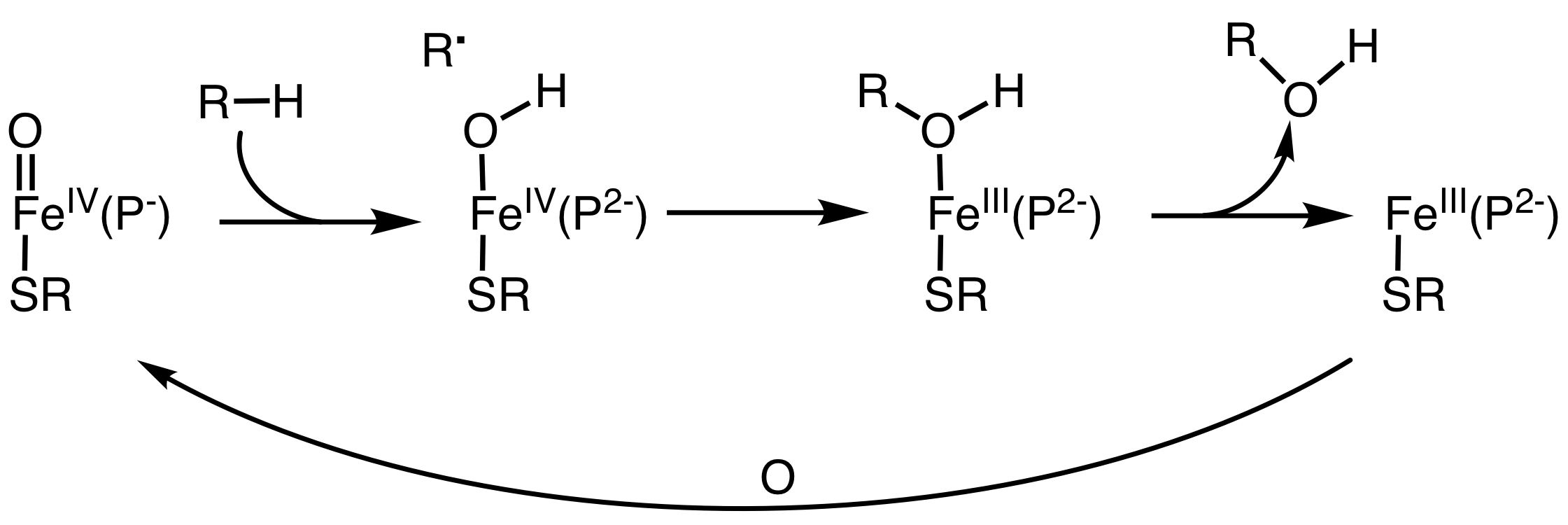
Steps in an oxygen rebound mechanism: H-atom abstraction, oxygen rebound, alcohol decomplexation. The formal charge on the porphyrin changes from 1- to the more usual 2-.

Three main classes of these enzymes are cytochrome P450, alpha-ketoglutarate-dependent hydroxylases, and nonheme-diiron hydroxylases.
