= CYP3A43 =

Protein-coding gene in the species Homo sapiens

Identifiers
- Aliases: CYP3A43, cytochrome P450 family 3 subfamily A member 43
- External IDs: OMIM: 606534; GeneCards: CYP3A43
Available structures
PDB	Human UniProt search: PDBe RCSB
PDB	List of PDB id codes 1TQN, 1W0E, 1W0F, 1W0G, 2J0D, 2V0M, 3NXU, 3TJS, 3UA1, 4I3Q, 4I4G, 4I4H, 4K9T, 4K9U, 4K9V, 4K9W, 4K9X, 4NY4, 5A1P, 5A1R
Enzyme activity
EC #	BRENDA	ExPASy	KEGG	MetaCyc
1.14.14.1	↗	↗	↗	↗
1.14.14.56	↗	↗	↗	↗

Gene location (Human)
Chr.	Chromosome 7 (human)
Band	7q22.1	Start	99,828,013 bp
Band	7q22.1	End	99,866,093 bp
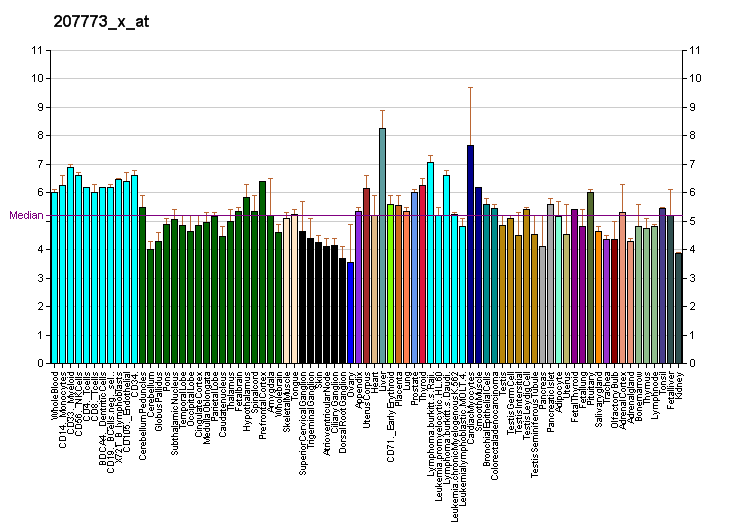

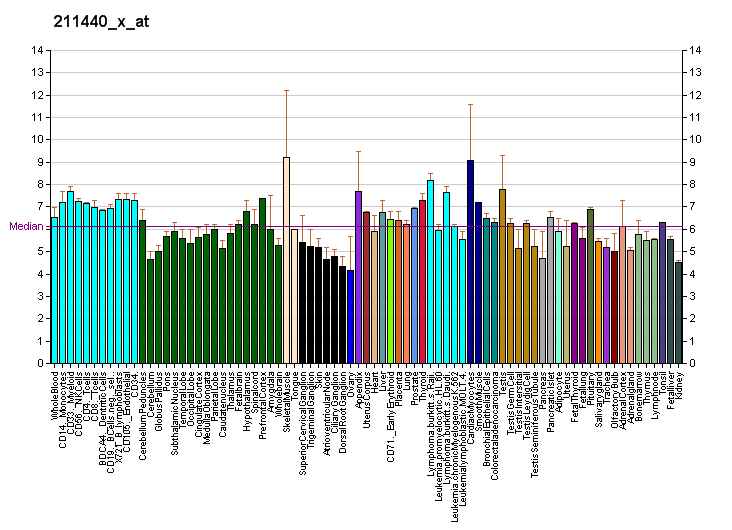

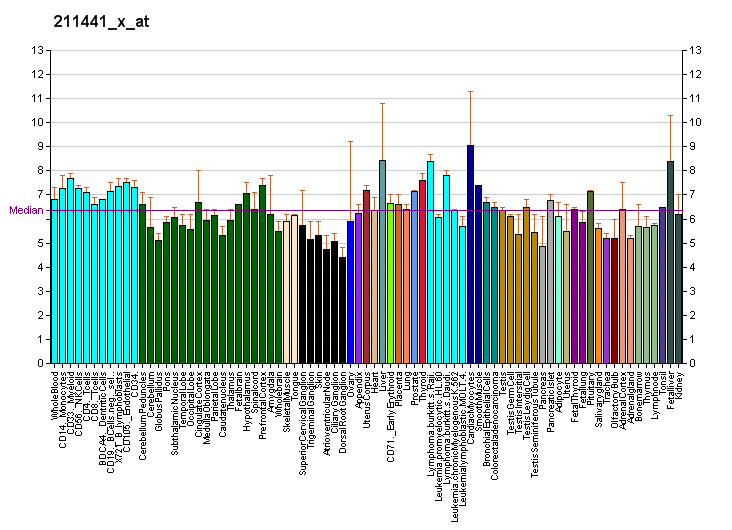
RNA expression pattern
Bgee	Human / Mouse (ortholog); Top expressed in: liver; right lobe of liver; testicle; mucosa of ileum; body of pancreas; jejunal mucosa; sperm; skeletal muscle tissue; lower limb muscles; prostate / n/a; More reference expression data
BioGPS	More reference expression data
Orthologs
Databases	NCBI: entry; OMA: entry
Species	Human	Mouse
Entrez	64816	n/a
Ensembl	ENSG00000021461	n/a
UniProt	Q9HB55	n/a
RefSeq (mRNA)	NM_001278921; NM_022820; NM_057095; NM_057096	n/a
RefSeq (protein)	NP_001265850; NP_073731; NP_476436; NP_476437	n/a
Location (UCSC)	Chr 7: 99.83 – 99.87 Mb	n/a
PubMed search		n/a
- Wikidata
View/Edit Human

Cytochrome P450 3A43 is a protein that in humans is encoded by the CYP3A43 gene.

This gene encodes a member of the cytochrome P450 superfamily of enzymes. The cytochrome P450 proteins are monooxygenases which catalyze many reactions involved in drug metabolism and synthesis of cholesterol, steroids and other lipids. This enzyme has a low level of testosterone hydroxylase activity. Although it bears homology to some drug-metabolizing cytochrome P450s, it is unknown whether the enzyme is also involved in xenobiotic metabolism. This gene is part of a cluster of cytochrome P450 genes on chromosome 7q21.1. Alternate splicing of this gene results in three transcript variants encoding different isoforms.
