= Cholest-4-en-3-one 26-monooxygenase =

Class of enzymes

Identifiers
- EC no.: 1.14.13.141

Databases
- IntEnz: IntEnz view
- BRENDA: BRENDA entry
- ExPASy: NiceZyme view
- KEGG: KEGG entry
- MetaCyc: metabolic pathway
- PRIAM: profile
- PDB structures: RCSB PDB PDBe PDBsum
Search
- PMC: articles
- PubMed: articles
- NCBI: proteins

Cholest-4-en-3-one 26-monooxygenase (EC 1.14.13.141, CYP125, CYP125A1, cholest-4-en-3-one 27-monooxygenase) is an enzyme with systematic name cholest-4-en-3-one,NADH:oxygen oxidoreductase (26-hydroxylating). This enzyme catalyses the following chemical reaction

cholest-4-en-3-one + NADH + H^{+} + O_{2} $\rightleftharpoons$ 26-hydroxycholest-4-en-3-one + NAD^{+} + H_{2}O

Cholest-4-en-3-one 26-monooxygenase is a heme thiolate (P450) enzyme.
