= Cytochrome P450 =

Class of enzymes

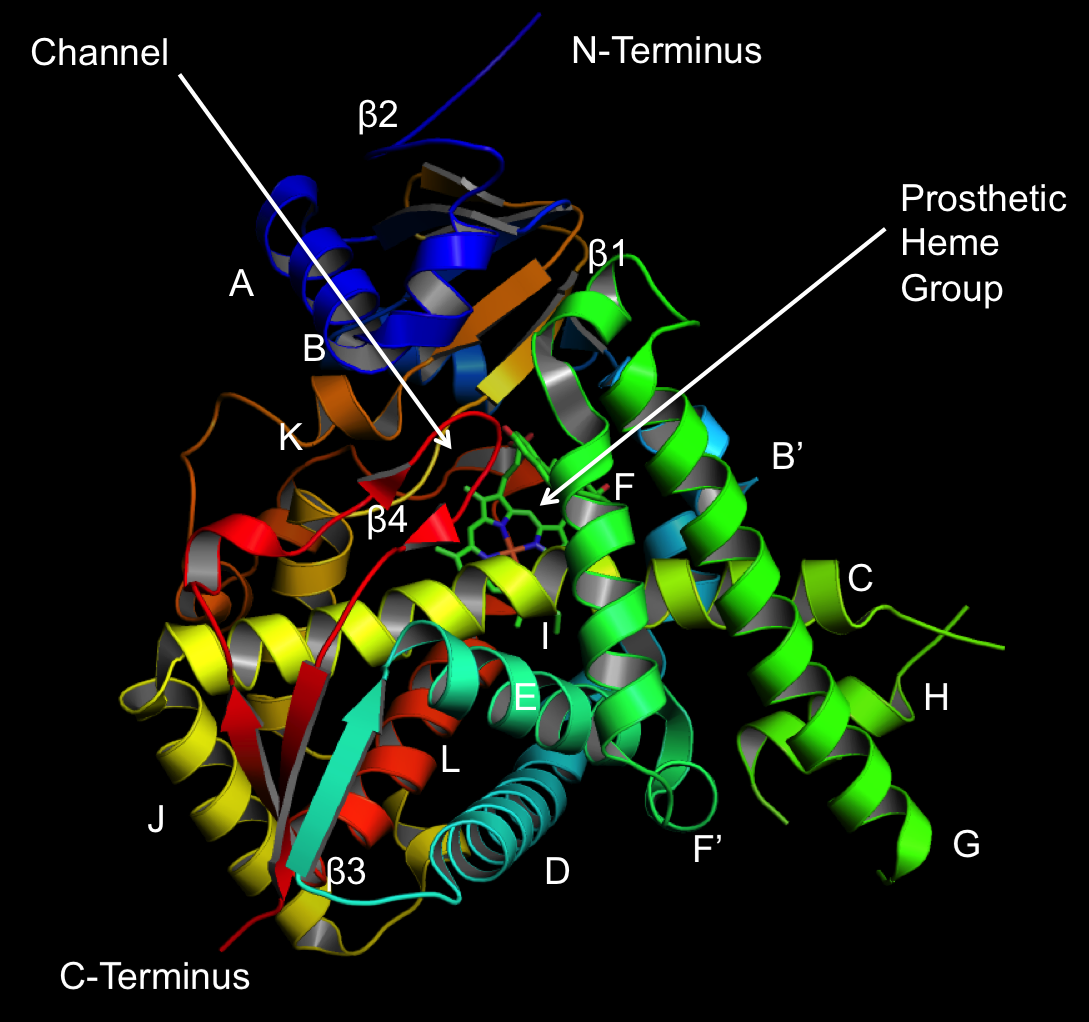
- Structure of lanosterol 14α-demethylase (CYP51)

Identifiers
- Symbol: p450
- Pfam: PF00067
- InterPro: IPR001128
- PROSITE: PDOC00081
- SCOP2: 2cpp / SCOPe / SUPFAM
- OPM superfamily: 39
- OPM protein: 2bdm
- CDD: cd00302
- Membranome: 265
Available protein structures:
- PDB: IPR001128 PF00067 (ECOD; PDBsum)
- AlphaFold: IPR001128; PF00067

Cytochromes P450 (P450s or CYPs) are a superfamily of enzymes containing heme as a cofactor that mostly, but not exclusively, function as monooxygenases. However, they are not omnipresent; for example, they have not been found in Escherichia coli. In mammals, these enzymes oxidize steroids, fatty acids, xenobiotics, and participate in many biosyntheses. By hydroxylation, CYP450 enzymes convert xenobiotics into hydrophilic derivatives, which are more readily excreted.

P450s are, in general, the terminal oxidase enzymes in electron transfer chains, broadly categorized as P450-containing systems. The term "P450" is derived from the spectrophotometric peak at the wavelength of the absorption maximum of the enzyme (450 nm) when it is in the reduced state and complexed with carbon monoxide. Most P450s require a protein partner to deliver one or more electrons to reduce the iron (and eventually molecular oxygen).

Despite their name, they are not considered cytochromes under the strict IUB definition, since they characteristically transfer oxygen groups instead of simple electrons.

The most common reaction catalyzed by cytochromes P450 is a monooxygenase reaction, e.g., insertion of one atom of oxygen into the aliphatic position of an organic substrate (RH), while the other oxygen atom is reduced to water:

RH + O_{2} + NADPH + H^{+} → ROH + H_{2}O + NADP^{+}

== Classification ==
=== Nomenclature ===
Genes encoding P450 enzymes, and the enzymes themselves, are designated with the root symbol CYP for the superfamily, followed by a number indicating the gene family, a capital letter indicating the subfamily, and another numeral for the individual gene. The convention is to italicize the name when referring to the gene. For example, CYP2E1 is the gene that encodes the enzyme CYP2E1—one of the enzymes involved in paracetamol (acetaminophen) metabolism. The CYP nomenclature is the official naming convention, although occasionally CYP450 or CYP_{450} is used synonymously. Some gene or enzyme names for P450s are also referred to by historical names (e.g. P450_{BM3} for CYP102A1) or functional names, denoting the catalytic activity and the name of the compound used as substrate. Examples include CYP5A1, thromboxane A_{2} synthase, abbreviated to TBXAS1 (thromboxane A_{2} synthase 1), and CYP51A1, lanosterol 14-α-demethylase, sometimes abbreviated to LDM according to its substrate and activity (demethylation).

The nomenclature guidelines suggest that members of new CYP families share at least 40% amino-acid identity, while members of subfamilies must share at least 55% amino-acid identity. The Cytochrome P450 nomenclature committee assigns and tracks the gene names (Cytochrome P450 Homepage) whereas allele names are tracked by PharmVar (The Pharmacogene Variation Consortium, previously the CYP Allele Nomenclature Committee). These similarity-based groupings are frequently recovered in phylogenetic analyses and members generally share features in their catalytic activities. Sometimes the suggested similarity thresholds do not exactly match what phylogenetic patterns show (e.g. a new member that is close to a family but only 39% identical), causing what is known as "family creep" as the similarity threshold is reduced, or the occasional split of families.

There is a universal nomenclature for the assignment of P450 family numbers across the taxonomic groups:

- CYP1–49, CYP301–CYP499, ...: Animals
  - CYP440–446: Reserved for CYP74 clan members found in animals
- CYP51–69, CYP501–CYP699, ...: Fungi and Lower Eukaryotes
  - CYP6001–CYP6099: Fungal fusions of P450s with other enzymes, e.g. dioxygenases or peroxygenases or isomerases.
- CYP71–99, CYP701–CYP999, ...: Plants (Archaeplastida)
- CYP101–299, ... Bacteria

The taxonomic group blocks are defined for CYP1001–CYP69999 by stretching the taxonomic blocks defined for CYP101–999. For example, CYP3001–4999 and CYP30001–CYP49999 are allocated to animals. The reservations defined under these groups are not stretched. Several databases are available for the tracking of defined P450 family numbers, subfamily letters, and ortholog group numbers, with the intention that not only there is no ambiguity in what each family-subfamily prefix means, but also that identically-named genes across different species are orthologous to each other. As of April 2026, the most complete database is the P450 Atlas (version 1.3.0) covering 11068 families, 26037 subfamilies, 79577 ortholog groups and 164068 example sequences of ortholog groups.

Comparison between many P450 enzymes of different families gives rise to the concept of clans, evolutionary grouping of families. The similarity cut-off is poorly defined, but it is generally understood that it derives from a few first-diverging nodes of a phylogenetic tree. Some clans only have one family while others are highly diversified with many families within (e.g. CYP71-clan and CYP85-clan). Tracking the emergence of clans and families across many taxonomic groups paints a vivid picture of the evolution of metabolic capabilities.

=== By electron transfer system ===
Based on the nature of the electron transfer proteins, P450s can be classified into several groups:

- CPR-P450 systems combine a cytochrome P450 reductase (CPR) and a P450 domain.
  - Microsomal P450 systems in which electrons are transferred from NADPH via a CPR (variously CPR, POR, or CYPOR).
  - Also found in bacteria such as the P450meg (CYP106A2) from Bacillus megaterium.
- Fr/Fd/P450 systems which employ a ferredoxin reductase and a ferredoxin to transfer electrons to P450. A representative is the plant plastid P450cam (CYP101A1) system from the CAM operon for camphor-related substrates.
  - Mitochondrial P450 systems which employ adrenodoxin reductase and adrenodoxin (a ferrodoxin) to transfer electrons from NADPH to P450.
  - FMN/Fd/P450 systems: originally found in Rhodococcus species, in which a FMN-domain-containing reductase is fused to the CYP.
- CYB_{5}R/cyb_{5}/P450 systems in which both electrons required by the CYP come from cytochrome b_{5}, which is in turn reduced by cytochrome b_{5} reductase (CYB_{5}R).
- P450-only system which do not require external reducing power. Notable ones include thromboxane synthase (CYP5), prostacyclin synthase (CYP8), and CYP74A (allene oxide synthase).

== Mechanism ==
The "Fe(V) intermediate" at the bottom left is a simplification: it is an Fe(IV) with a radical heme ligand.

=== Structure ===
The active site of cytochrome P450 contains a heme-iron center. The iron is tethered to the protein via a cysteine thiolate ligand. This cysteine and several flanking residues are highly conserved in known P450s, and have the formal PROSITE signature consensus pattern [FW] - [SGNH] - x - [GD] - {F} - [RKHPT] - {P} - C - [LIVMFAP] - [GAD]. In general, the P450 catalytic cycle proceeds as follows:

=== Catalytic cycle ===
1. Substrate binds in proximity to the heme group, on the side opposite to the axial thiolate. Substrate binding induces a change in the conformation of the active site, often displacing a water molecule from the distal axial coordination position of the heme iron, and changing the state of the heme iron from low-spin to high-spin.
2. Substrate binding induces electron transfer from NAD(P)H via cytochrome P450 reductase or another associated reductase, converting Fe(III) to Fe(II). (However many P450s are reduced in the absence of substrate and exist already in the ferrous form in intact cells.)
3. Molecular oxygen binds to the resulting ferrous heme center at the distal axial coordination position, initially giving a dioxygen adduct similar to oxy-myoglobin.
4. A second electron is transferred, from either cytochrome P450 reductase, ferredoxins, or cytochrome b_{5}, reducing the Fe-O_{2} adduct to give a short-lived peroxo state.
5. The peroxo group formed in step 4 is rapidly protonated twice, releasing one molecule of water and forming the highly reactive species referred to as P450 Compound 1 (or just Compound I). This highly reactive intermediate was isolated in 2010, P450 Compound 1 is an iron(IV) oxo (or ferryl) species with an additional oxidizing equivalent delocalized over the porphyrin and thiolate ligands. Evidence for the alternative perferryl iron(V)-oxo is lacking.

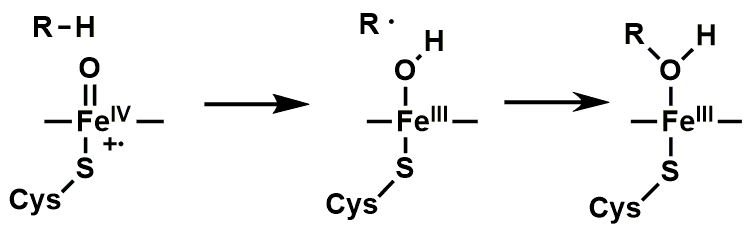
Oxygen rebound mechanism utilized by cytochrome P450 for conversion of hydrocarbons to alcohols via the action of "compound I", an iron(IV) oxide bound to a heme radical cation.

Depending on the substrate and enzyme involved, P450 enzymes can catalyze any of a wide variety of reactions. A hypothetical hydroxylation is illustrated. After the hydroxylated product has been released from the active site, the enzyme returns to its original state, with a water molecule returning to occupy the distal coordination position of the iron nucleus.

An alternative route for mono-oxygenation is via the "peroxide shunt" (path "S" in figure). This pathway entails oxidation of the ferric-substrate complex with oxygen-atom donors such as peroxides and hypochlorites. A hypothetical peroxide "XOOH" is shown in the diagram.

Mechanistic details, including the oxygen rebound mechanism, have been investigated with synthetic analogues, consisting of iron oxo heme complexes.

=== Spectroscopy ===
Binding of substrate is reflected in the spectral properties of the enzyme, with an increase in absorbance at 390 nm and a decrease at 420 nm. This can be measured by difference spectroscopy and is referred to as the "type I" difference spectrum (see inset graph in figure). Some substrates cause an opposite change in spectral properties, a "reverse type I" spectrum, by processes that are as yet unclear. Inhibitors and certain substrates that bind directly to the heme iron give rise to the type II difference spectrum, with a maximum at 430 nm and a minimum at 390 nm (see inset graph in figure). If no reducing equivalents are available, this complex may remain stable, allowing the degree of binding to be determined from absorbance measurements in vitro C: If carbon monoxide (CO) binds to reduced P450, the catalytic cycle is interrupted. This reaction yields the classic CO difference spectrum with a maximum at 450 nm. However, the interruptive and inhibitory effects of CO varies upon different CYPs such that the CYP3A family is relatively less affected.

=== Binding site ===
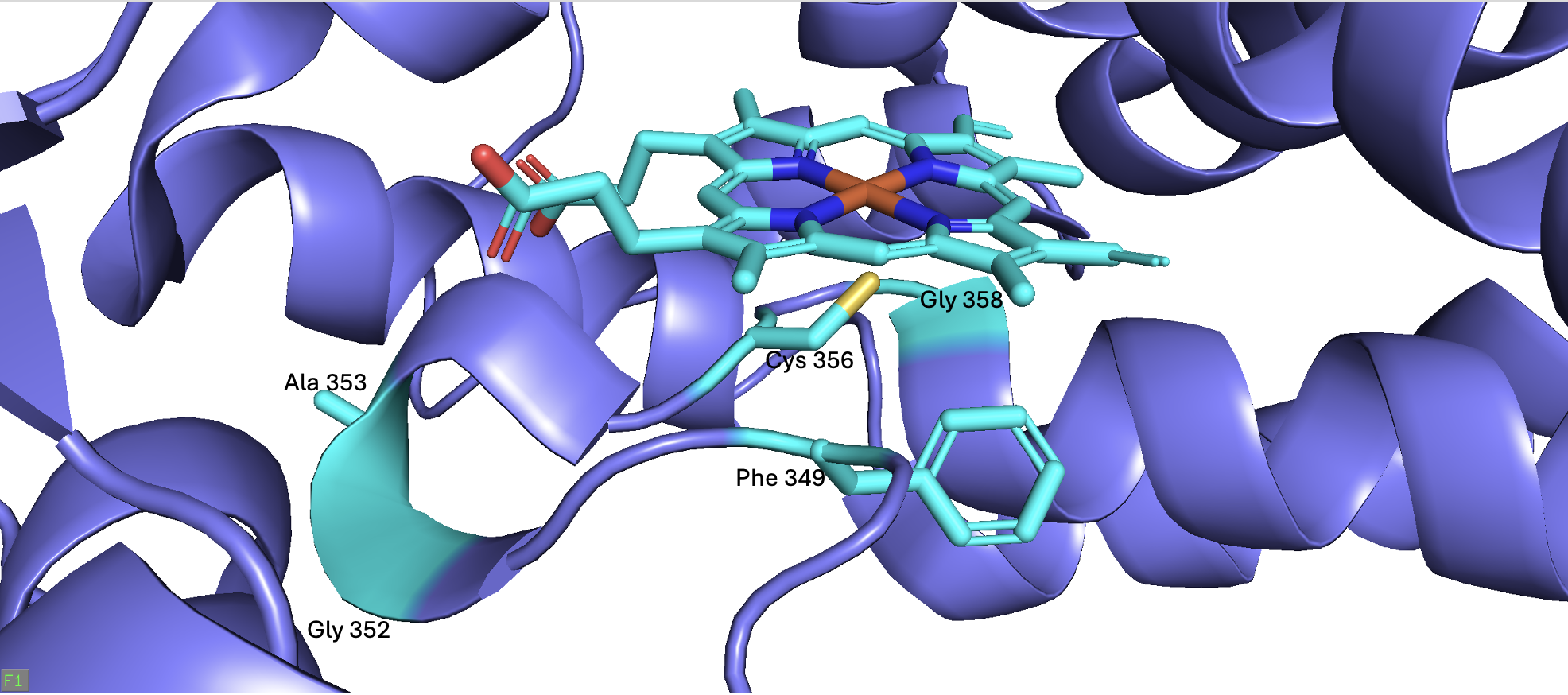
The conserved sequence of cytochrome P450 is highlighted, depicting how specific amino acid residues are essential for binding to a heme. In cytochrome p450 as seen in Streptomyces antibioticus (PDB code 4XE3), Phe349, Gly352, Ala353, Cys356, and Gly358 represent the conserved domain.

The heme in cytochrome P450 binds to a conserved sequence: FxxGxRxCxG, where "x" denotes any amino acid residue. The cysteine (C) binds iron and arginine (R), forming strong electrostatic interactions with negatively charged side chains of the heme. The glycine (G) residues within the conserved sequence are essential, as their small structure enables surrounding alpha helices to remain in place without interacting with a variant amino acid. Additional conserved motifs are:

- ExxR (K-helix)
- AGxDTT (I-helix, oxygen-binding domain)

== Other hydroxylation enzymes ==
Many hydroxylation reactions (insertion of hydroxyl groups) use CYP enzymes, but many other hydroxylases exist. Alpha-ketoglutarate-dependent hydroxylases also rely on an Fe=O intermediate but lack hemes. Methane monooxygenase, which converts methane to methanol, are non-heme iron-and iron-copper-based enzymes.

== See also ==
- Cytochrome P450 oxidoreductase deficiency
- Cytochrome P450 engineering
- Pharmacogenomics
