= Sulprostone =

Chemical compound

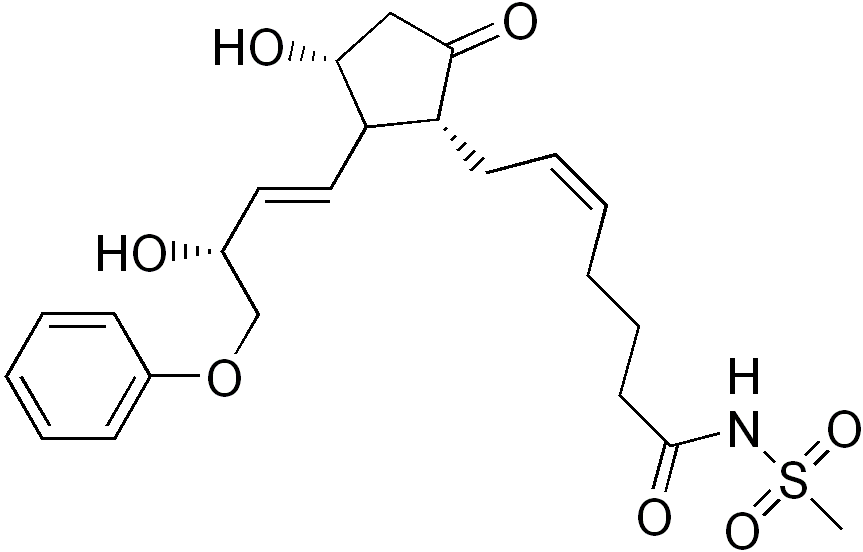

Clinical data
- AHFS/Drugs.com: International Drug Names
- ATC code: G02AD05 (WHO)

Identifiers
- IUPAC name: (Z)-7-[(1R,3R)-3-hydroxy-2-[(E,3R)-3-hydroxy-4-phenoxybut-1-enyl]-5-oxocyclopentyl]-N-methylsulfonylhept-5-enamide
- CAS Number: 60325-46-4
- PubChem CID: 5312153
- ChemSpider: 4471583
- UNII: 501Q5EQ1GM
- KEGG: D02725
- ChEMBL: ChEMBL284178
- CompTox Dashboard (EPA): DTXSID5049029
- ECHA InfoCard: 100.056.503

Chemical and physical data
- Formula: C_{23}H_{31}NO_{7}S
- Molar mass: 465.56 g·mol^{−1}
- 3D model (JSmol): Interactive image
- SMILES: CS(=O)(=O)NC(=O)CCC/C=C\C[C@@H]1[C@H]([C@@H](CC1=O)O)/C=C/[C@H](COc2ccccc2)O
- InChI: InChI=1S/C23H31NO7S/c1-32(29,30)24-23(28)12-8-3-2-7-11-19-20(22(27)15-21(19)26)14-13-17(25)16-31-18-9-5-4-6-10-18/h2,4-7,9-10,13-14,17,19-20,22,25,27H,3,8,11-12,15-16H2,1H3,(H,24,28)/b7-2-,14-13+/t17-,19-,20-,22-/m1/s1; Key:UQZVCDCIMBLVNR-TWYODKAFSA-N

Sulprostone is an analogue of prostaglandin E2 (PGE_{2}) that has oxytocic activity in assays of rat kidney cells and tissues. There are four known receptors which mediate various but often different cellular and tissue responses to PGE_{2}: prostaglandin EP1 receptor, prostaglandin EP2 receptor, prostaglandin EP3 receptor, and prostaglandin EP4 receptor. Sulprosotone binds to and activates the prostaglandin EP3 receptor with far greater efficacy than the other PGE_{2} receptors and also has the advantage of being relatively resistant, compared with PGE_{2}, to becoming metabolically degraded. It is listed as a comparatively weak receptor agonist of the prostaglandin EP1 receptor. In all events, this as well as other potent synthetic EP_{3} receptor antagonists have the realized or potential ability to promote the beneficial effects of prostaglandin EP3 receptor activation.

Sulprostone (as well as other prostanoids receptor agonists) is in use for inducing medical abortion and ending pregnancy after fetal death, for the treatment of severe atonic postpartum hemorrhage after vaginal delivery, and for removal of the placenta in patients with retained placenta. Currently, sulprostone along with SC-46275, MB-28767, ONO-AE-248 and other EP_{3} receptor agonists are in development as drugs for the possible treatment of stomach ulcers in humans.
