= Prostaglandin DP1 receptor =

Protein-coding gene in the species Homo sapiens

PTGDR

Identifiers
- Aliases: PTGDR, AS1, ASRT1, DP, DP1, PTGDR1, prostaglandin D2 receptor (DP), prostaglandin D2 receptor
- External IDs: OMIM: 604687; MGI: 102966; GeneCards: PTGDR

Gene location (Human)
Chr.	Chromosome 14 (human)
Band	14q22.1	Start	52,267,698 bp
Band	14q22.1	End	52,276,724 bp

Gene location (Mouse)
Chr.	Chromosome 14 (mouse)
Band	14 C1|14 22.59 cM	Start	45,088,692 bp
Band	14 C1|14 22.59 cM	End	45,096,832 bp
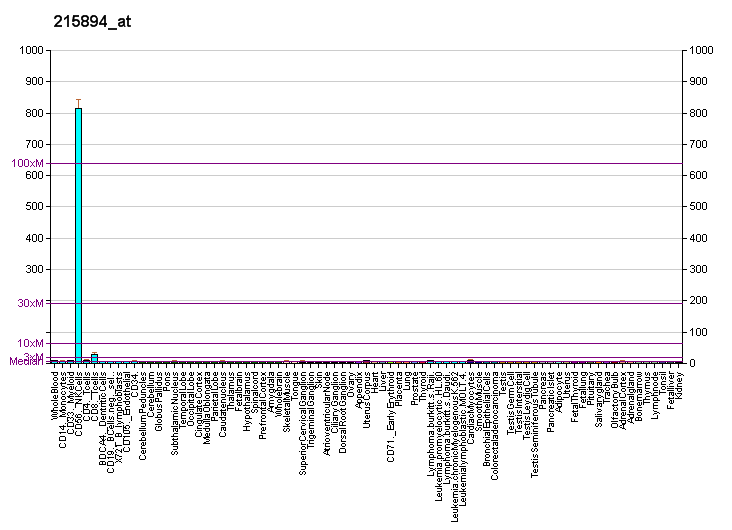
RNA expression pattern
Bgee	Human / Mouse (ortholog); Top expressed in: granulocyte; mucosa of transverse colon; rectum; parietal pleura; mucosa of sigmoid colon; germinal epithelium; trigeminal ganglion; blood; spleen; visceral pleura / Top expressed in: lumbar spinal ganglion; granulocyte; pharynx; larynx; embryo; respiratory epithelium; nasal epithelium; olfactory epithelium; knee joint; triceps brachii muscle; More reference expression data
BioGPS	More reference expression data
Gene ontology
Molecular function	protein binding; signal transducer activity; G protein-coupled receptor activity; prostaglandin J receptor activity; prostaglandin D receptor activity; prostaglandin E receptor activity
Cellular component	integral component of membrane; plasma membrane; membrane; intracellular anatomical structure
Biological process	sleep; adenosine metabolic process; signal transduction; male sex determination; inflammatory response; cellular response to prostaglandin E stimulus; cellular response to prostaglandin D stimulus; G protein-coupled receptor signaling pathway; adenylate cyclase-activating G protein-coupled receptor signaling pathway; positive regulation of cytosolic calcium ion concentration
Sources:Amigo / QuickGO
Orthologs
Databases	NCBI: entry; OMA: entry
Species	Human	Mouse
Entrez	5729	19214
Ensembl	ENSG00000168229	ENSMUSG00000071489
UniProt	Q13258	P70263
RefSeq (mRNA)	NM_000953; NM_001281469	NM_008962
RefSeq (protein)	NP_000944; NP_001268398	NP_032988
Location (UCSC)	Chr 14: 52.27 – 52.28 Mb	Chr 14: 45.09 – 45.1 Mb
PubMed search
- Wikidata
View/Edit Human	View/Edit Mouse

The prostaglandin D_{2} receptor 1 (DP_{1}), a G protein-coupled receptor encoded by the PTGDR gene (also termed PTGDR1), is primarily a receptor for prostaglandin D_{2} (PGD_{2}). The receptor is a member of the prostaglandin receptors belonging to the subfamily A14 of rhodopsin-like receptors. Activation of DP_{1} by PGD_{2} or other cognate receptor ligands is associated with a variety of physiological and pathological responses in animal models.

== Gene ==
The PTGDR gene is located on chromosome 14 at position q22.1, (i.e. 14q22.1), a chromosomal locus associated with asthma and other allergic disorders. PTGDR, which consists of 4 introns and 5 exons, encodes for a ~44 kilodalton protein but also multiple alternative spliced transcript variants.

== Expression ==
DP_{1} is expressed primarily by cells involved in mediating allergic and inflammatory reactions, i.e. human and rodent mast cells, basophils, and eosinophils, Th2 cells, and dendritic cells, and by cells contributing to these reactions, i.e. human and/or rodent airway epithelial cells, vascular endothelium, mucus-secreting goblet cells in the nasal and colonic mucosa, and serous gland cells of the nose. DP_{1} protein is expressed in mouse placenta and testes and mRNA transcripts have also been detected in the meninges of the mouse brain by multiple reports and, by single reports, in the rat meninges as well as the mouse thalamus, hippocampus, cerebellum, brainstem, and retina.

== Ligands ==
=== Activating ligands ===
PGD_{2} binds to and activates DP_{1} at concentrations in the 0.5 to 1 nanomolar range. Relative potencies in binding to and activating DP_{1} for the following prostanoids are: PGD_{2}>>PGE_{2}>prostaglandin F_{2α}>PGI_{2}=thromboxane A2, with PGD_{2} being more than 100-fold more potent than PGE_{2} in binding to and stimulating DP_{1}. PDJ2, Δ12-PDJ2, and 15-deoxy-Δ12,14-PGJ2, which form in vitro and in vivo rapidly as non-enzymatic rearrangements of PGD_{2} (see cyclopentenone prostaglandins), also bind to and activate DP_{1}, with PDJ2 doing so almost as effectively as PDG2 and the latter two PGJs doing so 100-fold and 300-fold less potently than PDG2. Other compounds, e.g. L-644,698, BW 245C, BW A868C, and ZK 110841, have been synthesized, found to be about as potent as PGD_{2} in binding to and stimulating DP_{1}, and used to study the function of this receptor.

The drug treprostinil is a high affinity ligand for and potent activator of not only DP_{1} but also two other prostanoid receptors, EP_{2} and IP.

=== Inhibiting ligands ===
Asapiprant (S-555739) and laropiprant are selective receptor antagonists of DP_{1} whereas vidupiprant is a receptor antagonist for both DP_{1} and DP_{2}.

== Mechanisms of cell activation ==
Among the 8 human prostanoid receptors, DP_{1}, along with IP, EP_{2}, and EP_{4}, are classified as relaxant prostanoid receptors; each, including DP_{1}, is a G protein-coupled receptors that works by activating G-S proteins which in turn raises cellular cAMP levels thereby mobilizing cyclic adenosine monophosphate-activated cell signaling pathways which regulate cell function. DP_{1} activation also causes the mobilization of calcium in HEK293 cells transfected with this receptor. It does so by a mechanism that is independent of inositol trisphosphate signaling; Ligand-activated DP_{1} also mobilizes G protein-coupled receptor kinase 2 (GRK2, also known as β-adrenergic receptor kinase 2 [BARK1]) and arrestin 2 (also known as arrestin beta 1 [ARRB1]). These agents act to uncouple DP_{1} from its G proteins and to internalize in a process that limits the DP_{1}'s cell-activation life-time in a process termed homologous desensitization. Activation of protein kinase Cs likewise trigger DP_{1} to uncouple from G proteins and internalize although in model studies DP_{1} has not been shown to cause the activation of PKC (see Protein kinase C#Function).

== Activities ==
=== Allergy ===
==== Tissue studies ====
Studies in mouse as well as human tissues and cells find that DP_{1} stimulation has numerous pro-allergic effects. DP_{1} activation blocks the production of interleukin 12 by dendritic cells; this biases the development of naïve T lymphocytes to Th-2 rather than Th-1 helper cells and thereby promotes allergic rather than non-allergic inflammatory responses (see T helper cell#Th1/Th2 Model for helper T cells and T helper cell#Limitations to the Th1/Th2 model. DH1 activation also promotes allergic reactions by suppressing the function of natural killer cells, prolonging the survival of eosinophils, and stimulation the maturation of dermal mast cell.

==== Animal studies ====
Studies of experimentally-induced allergic responses in animals further implicate DP_{1} in allergy. DP_{1} gene knockout and/or DP_{1} inhibition by receptor antagonists markedly reduces airway inflammation, obstruction, hypersensitivity, and pro-allergic cytokine and chemokine production in a mouse model of ovalbumin-induced asthma as well as allergic symptoms in a guinea pig model of allergic conjunctivitis, rhinitis, and asthma. The administration of PGD_{2} into the skin of rats or into the eyes of rabbits causes local symptoms of allery. These responses are thought, but not yet proved, to be mediated by DP_{1} activation. In contrast to these results, however, activation of DP_{1} by intratracheal administration of a selective DP_{1} activator activated DP_{1} on dendritic cells to suppress airway allergic inflammation by increasing the number of Foxp3+ CD4+ regulatory T cells. Furthermore, DP_{1} activation reduces eosinophilia in allergic inflammation and blocks antigen-presenting langerhans cell function in mice. This results suggest that DP_{1} can promote or suppress allergic responses depending on the animal model tested and, perhaps, the type of allergic reaction investigated.

==== Human studies ====
Allergen inhalation challenge of humans produces rises in the PGD_{2} levels in their bronchoalveolar lavage fluids. Furthermore, the administration of PGD_{2} into the nose or skin of human volunteers produces local symptoms of allergy and the inhalation of PGD_{2} into asthmatics causes constriction of the airways as well as the potentiation of airway constriction responses. These reactions, similar to those produced in animal studies, may be mediated by DP_{1}.

=== Central nervous system ===
PGD_{2} is the most abundant prostanoid in the brains of humans and other mammals and DP_{1} receptors are located on arachnoid mater trabecular cells in mouse basal forebrain. The PGD_{2}-DP_{1} pathway is involved in the regulation of non-rapid eye movement sleep in rodents: infusion of PGD_{2} into the lateral ventricle of mice or the brain of rats induces an increase in the amount of non-rapid eye movement sleep in wild-type (WT) but not DP_{1}-deficient animals. This sleep-induction appears to involve the DP_{1}-dependent stimulation of adenosine formation and subsequent simulation of the adenosine A2A receptor by adenosine. In humans, a genetic variant of ADA associated with the reduced metabolism of adenosine to inosine has been reported to deep sleep and SWA during sleep. These studies suggest that DP_{1} has a similar role in the sleep of humans.

=== Pulmonary hypertension ===
Pulmonary arterial hypertension in humans is commonly treated with specific pulmonary artery vasodilators that increase survival such as the prostacyclin I_{2} (PGI_{2}) mimetics including treprostinil, epoprostenol, iloprost, and beraprost. Recent studies find that DP_{1} as well as the PGI_{2} receptor protein are expressed in human pulmonary arteries and veins; that treprostinil but not iloprost caused pulmonary vein relaxation in part by acting through DP_{1} in insolated human pulmonary vascular preparations; and that the effect of treprostinil on DP_{1} in human pulmonary veins may contribute to its therapeutic efficacy in primary pulmonary hypertension.

=== Reproduction ===
Studies in male mice indicate that DP_{1} activation induces the translocation of SOX9 into the nucleus thereby signaling for the maturation of Sertoli cells and embryonic gonads. Disruption of this DP_{1}-activated circuit leads to disordered maturation of the male reproductive organs such as cryptorchidism (i.e. failure of testes descent into the scrotum) in mice and, it is suggested, may also do so in humans.

== Genomics studies ==
Human genomics studies have associated single-nucleotide polymorphism variants with an increased incidence of allergic diseases. Studies in two different populations have replicated associations between -549T>C, -441C>T, and -197T>C variants and a study in a single population has associated the -613C>T variation with increased incidences of nasal polyposis, asthma, and/or aspirin sensitivity; the -197T>C and -613 C>T variants were also associated with increased incidences of allergic reactions to pollen and mites. A single population study associated the -731A>C variant and studies in two different population associated the 6651C>T variant with increased incidences of asthma and/or bronchial hyper-reactivity. The intrinsic variants rs17831675, rs17831682, and rs58004654 (now termed rs7709505) have been associated with an increased incidence of asthma in single population studies. A metaanalasis −549 C/T, −441 C/T, and −197 C/T found that of these three variants, only −549 C/T conferred susceptibility to asthma in Europeans and that this susceptibility was limited to adults.

== See also ==
- Prostaglandin receptors
- Prostanoid receptors
- Prostaglandin DP_{2} receptor
- Eicosanoid receptor
