= Enprostil =

Chemical compound

Clinical data
- AHFS/Drugs.com: International Drug Names
- ATC code: A02BB02 (WHO)

Identifiers
- IUPAC name: methyl 7-[(1S,2S,3S)-3-hydroxy-2-[(3R)-3-hydroxy-4-phenoxybut-1-enyl]-5-oxocyclopentyl]hepta-4,5-dienoate
- CAS Number: 73121-56-9
- PubChem CID: 5311225
- ChemSpider: 4470744
- UNII: J4IP5Z9DAU
- KEGG: D01891

Chemical and physical data
- Formula: C_{23}H_{28}O_{6}
- Molar mass: 400.471 g·mol^{−1}
- 3D model (JSmol): Interactive image
- SMILES: COC(=O)CCC=C=CC[C@@H]1[C@H]([C@@H](CC1=O)O)/C=C/[C@H](COc2ccccc2)O
- InChI: InChI=1S/C23H28O6/c1-28-23(27)12-8-3-2-7-11-19-20(22(26)15-21(19)25)14-13-17(24)16-29-18-9-5-4-6-10-18/h3-7,9-10,13-14,17,19-20,22,24,26H,8,11-12,15-16H2,1H3/b14-13+/t2?,17-,19-,20-,22-/m1/s1; Key:PTOJVMZPWPAXER-VFJVYMGBSA-N

Enprostil is a synthetic prostaglandin designed to resemble dinoprostone. Enprostil was found to be a highly potent inhibitor of gastric HCl secretion. It is an analog of prostaglandin E2 but unlike this prostaglandin, which binds to and activates all four cellular receptors viz., EP1, EP2, EP3, and EP4 receptors, enprostil is a more selective receptor agonist in that it binds to and activates primarily the EP3 receptor. Consequently, enprostil is expected to have a narrower range of actions that may avoid some of the unwanted side-effects and toxicities of prostaglandin E2. A prospective multicenter randomized controlled trial conducted in Japan found combining enprostil with cimetidine was more effective than cimetidine alone in treating gastric ulcer.

== See also ==
- Prostaglandin receptors
- EP3 and peptic ulcer
