= Prostaglandin E2 receptor =

G protein-coupled receptor

The prostaglandin E_{2} (PGE_{2}) receptors are G protein-coupled receptors that bind and are activated by prostaglandin E_{2}. They are members of the prostaglandin receptors class of receptors and include the following Protein isoforms:

- Prostaglandin E_{2} receptor 1 (EP_{1}) - PTGER1
- Prostaglandin E_{2} receptor 2 (EP_{2}) - PTGER2
- Prostaglandin E_{2} receptor 3 (EP_{3}) - PTGER3
- Prostaglandin E_{2} receptor 4 (EP_{4}) - PTGER4

== Research ==
An antagonist of a prostaglandin E_{2} receptor has been shown to serve as an affective contraceptive for female macaques while unaffecting their menstrual cyclicity as well as hormonal patterns. The exact reason behind the reduced amount of successful pregnancies of primates during the study is unclear due a number of possibilities that may affect such result. Inhibition of the prostaglandin EP_{4} receptor has been shown to inhibit tumor growth, angiogenesis, lymphangiogenesis, and metastasis.

== Prostaglandin E_{2} and its effect on inflammation ==
Prostaglandins are derived from the parent molecule arachidonic acid. The synthesis of prostaglandins can be blocked by anti-inflammatory drugs such as ibuprofen. Nonsteroidal anti-inflammatory drugs (NSAIDs) block the synthesis of cyclooxygenases (COX) which in turn produce prostaglandins. Prostaglandins (PG) are the result of an enzyme cascade pathway that includes two enzymes cyclooxygenase and PG synthase. Prostaglandin E_{2} is produced by PGE synthase via the activation of EP1-4 receptors. Prostaglandin E_{2} is associated with the development of vascular diseases that lead to inflammation in the body. In the human body, PGE_{2} is involved in the control of the vascular smooth muscle, cell migration, and the division of a cell into two daughter cells. The process of producing two daughter cells via cell division is called cell proliferation.

== See also ==
- Prostaglandin receptors
- Prostaglandin
