= Eicosanoid receptor =

Integral membrane protein G protein-coupled receptor

Most of the eicosanoid receptors are integral membrane protein G protein-coupled receptors (GPCRs) that bind and respond to eicosanoid signaling molecules. Eicosanoids are rapidly metabolized to inactive products and therefore are short-lived. Accordingly, the eicosanoid-receptor interaction is typically limited to a local interaction: cells, upon stimulation, metabolize arachidonic acid to an eicosanoid which then binds cognate receptors on either its parent cell (acting as an autocrine signalling molecule) or on nearby cells (acting as a paracrine signalling molecule) to trigger functional responses within a restricted tissue area, e.g. an inflammatory response to an invading pathogen. In some cases, however, the synthesized eicosanoid travels through the blood (acting as a hormone-like messenger) to trigger systemic or coordinated tissue responses, e.g. prostaglandin (PG) E2 released locally travels to the hypothalamus to trigger a febrile reaction (see Fever § PGE2 release). An example of a non-GPCR receptor that binds many eicosanoids is the PPAR-γ nuclear receptor.

The following is a list of human eicosanoid GPCRs grouped according to the type of eicosanoid ligand that each binds:

== Leukotriene ==
Leukotrienes:

- BLT_{1} (Leukotriene B_{4} receptor) – LTB4R; BLT1 is the primary receptor for leukotriene B4. Relative potencies in binding to and stimulating BLT1 are: leukotriene B4>20-hydroxy-leukotriene B4>>12-Hydroxyeicosatetraenoic acid (R isomer) (http://www.guidetopharmacology.org/GRAC/ObjectDisplayForward?objectId=267; also see ALOX12B and 12-Hydroxyeicosatetraenoic acid). BLT1 activation is associated with pro-inflammatory responses in cells, tissues, and animal models.
- BLT_{2} (Leukotriene B_{4} receptor 2) – LTB4R2; the receptor for 12-Hydroxyheptadecatrienoic acid, leukotriene B4, and certain other eicosanoids and polyunsaturated fatty acid metabolites (see BLT2). Relative potencies in binding to and stimulating BLT2 are: 12-hydroxyheptadecatrienoic acid (S isomer)>leukotriene B4>12-Hydroxyeicosatetraenoic acid (S isomer)= 12-hydroperoxyeicosatetraenoic acid (S isomer)>15-Hydroxyeicosatetraenoic acid (S isomer])>12-hydroxyeicosatetraenoic acid (R isomer)>20-hydroxy-leukotriene LTB4 (http://www.guidetopharmacology.org/GRAC/ObjectDisplayForward?objectId=268). Activation of BLT2 is associated with pro-inflammatory responses by cells and tissues.
- CysLT_{1} (Cysteinyl leukotriene receptor 1) – CYSLTR1;CYSLTR1 is the receptor for Leukotriene C4 and Leukotriene D4; in binds and responds to leukotriene C4 more strongly than to leukotriene D4. Relative potencies for binding to and activation CYSLTR1 are: leukotriene C4≥ leukotriene D4>>leukotriene E4 (http://www.guidetopharmacology.org/GRAC/ObjectDisplayForward?objectId=270). Activation of this receptor is associated with pro-allergic responses in cells, tissues, and animal models.
- CysLT_{2} (Cysteinyl leukotriene receptor 2) – CYSLTR2; Similar to CYSLTR1, CYSLTR2 is the receptor for Leukotriene C4 and Leukotriene D4; it binds and responds to the latter two ligands equally well. Relative potencies in binding to and stimulating CYSLTR2 are: leukotriene C4≥leukotriene D4>>leukotriene E4 (http://www.guidetopharmacology.org/GRAC/ObjectDisplayForward?objectId=270). CYSLT2 Activation of this receptor is associated with pro-allergic responses in cells, tissues, and animal models.
- GPR99/OXGR1 – GPR99; GPR99, also known as the 2-oxoglutarate receptor 1 (OXGR1) or cysteinyl leukotriene receptor E (CysLTE), is a third CysLTR receptor; unlike CYSLTR1 and CYSLTR2, GPR99 binds and responds to Leukotriene E4 much more strongly than to leukotriene C4 or leukotriene D4. GPR99 is also the receptor for alpha-ketoglutarate, binding and responding to this ligand much more weakly than to any of the three cited leukotrienes. Activation of this receptor by LTC4 is associated with pro-allergic responses in cells and an animal model. The function of GPR99 as a receptor for leukotriene E4 has been confirmed in a mouse model of allergic rhinitis.
- GPR17 – GPR17; while one study reported that leukotriene C4, leukotriene D4, and leukotriene E4 bind to and activate GPR17 with equal potencies, many subsequent studies did not confirm this. GPR17, which is mainly expressed in the central nervous system, has also been reported to be the receptor for the purines, Adenosine triphosphate and Uridine diphosphate, and certain glycosylated uridine diphosphate purines (http://www.guidetopharmacology.org/GRAC/ObjectDisplayForward?objectId=88) as well as to be involved in animal models of central nervous system Demyelinating reactions. However, recent reports failed to confirm the latter findings; a consensus of current opinion holds that the true ligand(s) for GPR17 remain to be defined (http://www.guidetopharmacology.org/GRAC/ObjectDisplayForward?objectId=88).

== Lipoxin ==
Lipoxins:

- ALX/FPR2 (also termed FPR2, ALX, ALX/FPR, formyl peptide receptor-like 1) – FPR2; receptor for Lipoxin A4 and 15-epi-Lipoxin A4 (or AT-LxA4) eicosanoids but also many other agents including the docosanoids resolvin D1, resolvin D2, and 17R-resolvin D1 (see specialized pro-resolving mediators; oligopeptides such as N-Formylmethionine-leucyl-phenylalanine; and various proteins such as the amino acid 1 to 42 fragment of Amyloid beta, Humanin, and the N-terminally truncated form of the chemotactic chemokine, CCL23 (see FPR2#Ligands and ligand-based disease-related activities). Relative potencies in binding to and activating ALX/FPR are: lipoxin A4=aspirin-triggered lipoxin A4>leukotriene C4=leukotriene D4>>15-deoxy-LXA4>>N-Formylmethionine-leucyl-phenylalanine (http://www.guidetopharmacology.org/GRAC/ObjectDisplayForward?objectId=223}. Activation of ALX/FPR2 by the lipoxins is associated with anti-inflammatory responses by target cells and tissues. Receptors that bind and respond to a wide range of ligands with such seemingly different structural similarities as those of ALX/FPR are often termed promiscuous.

== Resolvin E ==
Resolvin Es:

- CMKLR1 – CMKLR1; CMKLR1, also termed Chemokine like receptor 1 or ChemR23, is the receptor for the eicosanoids resolvin E1 and 18S-resolvin E2 (see specialized pro-resolving mediators) as well as for chemerin, an adipokine protein; relative potencies in binding to and activating CMKLR1 are: resolvin E1>chemerin C-terminal peptide>18R-hydroxy-eicosapentaenoic acid (18R-EPE)>eicosapentaenoic acid (http://www.guidetopharmacology.org/GRAC/ObjectDisplayForward?objectId=79). Apparently, the resolvins activate this receptor in a different manner than chemerin: resolvins act through it to suppress while chemerin acts through it to stimulate pro-inflammatory responses in target cells

== Oxoeicosanoid ==
Oxoeicosanoid:

- Oxoeicosanoid (OXE) receptor 1 – OXER1; OXER1 is the receptor for 5-oxo-eicosatetraenoic acid (5-oxo-ETE) as well as certain other eicosanoids and long-chain polyunsaturated fatty acids that possess a 5-hydroxy or 5-oxo residue (see 5-Hydroxyeicosatetraenoic acid); relative potencies of the latter metabolites in binding to and activating OXER1 are: 5-oxoicosatetraenoic acid>5-oxo-15-hydroxy-eioxatetraenoic acid> 5S-hydroperoxy-eicosatetraenoic acid>5-Hydroxyeicosatetraenoic acid; the 5-oxo-eicosatrienoic and 5-oxo-octadecadienoic acid analogs of 5-oxo-ETE are as potent as 5-oxo-ETE in stimulating this receptor (http://www.guidetopharmacology.org/GRAC/ObjectDisplayForward?objectId=271). Activation of OXER1 is associated with pro-inflammatory and pro-allergic responses by cells and tissues as well as with the proliferation of various human cancer cell lines in culture.

== Prostanoid ==
Prostanoids and Prostaglandin receptors

Prostanoids are prostaglandins (PG), thromboxanes (TX), and prostacyclins (PGI). Seven, structurally-related, prostanoid receptors fall into three categories based on the cell activation pathways and activities which they regulate. Relaxant prostanoid receptors (IP, DP1, EP2, and EP4) raise cellular cAMP levels; contractile prostanoid receptors (TP, FP, and EP1) mobilize intracellular calcium; and the inhibitory prostanoid receptor (EP3) lowers cAMP levels. A final prostanoid receptor, DP2, is structurally related to the chemotaxis class of receptors and unlike the other prostanoid receptors mediates eosinophil, basophil, and T helper cell (Th2 type) chemotactic responses. Prostanoids, particularly PGE2 and PGI2, are prominent regulators of inflammation and allergic responses as defined by studies primarily in animal models but also as suggested by studies with human tissues and, in certain cases, human subjects.

- PGD_{2}: DP-(PGD_{2}) (PGD_{2} receptor)
  - DP_{1} (PTGDR1) – PTGDR1; DP1 is a receptor for Prostaglandin D2; relative potencies in binding to and activating DP1 for the following prostanoids are: PGD2>>PGE2>PGF2α>PGI2=TXA2 (http://www.guidetopharmacology.org/GRAC/ObjectDisplayForward?objectId=338). Activation of DP2 is associated with the promotion of inflammatory and the early stage of allergic responses; in limited set of circumstances, however, DP1 activation may ameliorate inflammatory responses.
  - DP_{2} (PTGDR2) – PTGDR2; DP2, also termed CRTH2, is a receptor for prostaglandin D2; relative potencies in binding to and stimulating PD2 are PGD2 >>PGF2α, PGE2>PGI2=TXA2 (http://www.guidetopharmacology.org/GRAC/ObjectDisplayForward?objectId=339&familyId=58&familyType=GPCR). While DP1 activation causes the chemotaxis of pro-inflammatory cells such as basophils, eosinophils, and T cell lymphocytes, its deletion in mice is associated with a reduction in an acute allergic responses in a rodent model. This and other observations suggest that DP2 and DP1 function to counteract each other.
- PGE_{2}: EP-(PGE_{2}) (PGE_{2} receptor)
  - EP_{1}-(PGE_{2}) (PTGER1) – PTGER1; EP1 is a receptor for prostaglandin E2; relative potencies in binding to and stimulating EP1 are PGE2>PGF2α=PGI2>PGD2=TXA2 (http://www.guidetopharmacology.org/GRAC/ObjectDisplayForward?objectId=346&familyId=58&familyType=GPCR). EP1 activation is associated with the promotion of inflammation, particularly in the area of inflammation-based pain perception, and asthma, particularly in the area of airways constriction.
  - EP_{2}-(PGE_{2}) (PTGER2) – PTGER2; EP2 is a receptor for prostaglandin E2; relative potencies in binding to and stimulating EP2 are PGE2>PGF2α=PGI2>PGD2=TXA2 (http://www.guidetopharmacology.org/GRAC/ObjectDisplayForward?objectId=341). EP2 activation is associated with the suppression of inflammation and inflammation-induced pulmonary fibrosis reactions as well as allergic reactions.
  - EP_{3}-(PGE_{2}) (PTGER3) – PTGER3; EP3 is a receptor for prostaglandin E2; relative potencies in binding to and stimulating EP3 are PGE2>PGF2α=PGI2>PGD2+TXA2 (http://www.guidetopharmacology.org/GRAC/ObjectDisplayForward?objectId=342). Activation of EP3 is associated with the suppression of the early and late phases of allergic responses; EP3 activation is also responsible for febrile responses to inflammation.
  - EP_{4}-(PGE_{2}) (PTGER4) – PTGER4; EP4 is a receptor for prostaglandin E2; relative potencies in binding to and stimulating EP4 are PGE2>PGF2α=PGI2>PGD2=TXA2 (http://www.guidetopharmacology.org/GRAC/ObjectDisplayForward?objectId=343). EP4, particularly in association with EP2, activation is critical for the development of arthritis in different animal models.
- PGF_{2α}: FP-(PGF_{2α}) (PTGFR) – PTGFR; FP is the receptor for prostaglandin F2 alpha; relative potencies in binding to and stimulating FP are PGF2α>PGD2>PGE2>PGI2=thromboxane A2 (http://www.guidetopharmacology.org/GRAC/ObjectDisplayForward?objectId=344). This receptor is the least selective of the prostanoid receptors in that both PGD2 and PGE2 bind to and stimulate it with potencies close to that of PGF2α. FP has two splice variants, FPa and FPb, which differ in the length of their C-terminus tails. PGF2α-induced activation of FP has pro-inflammatory effects as well as roles in ovulation, luteolysis, contraction of uterine smooth muscle, and initiation of parturition. Analogs of PGF2α have been developed for estrus synchronization, abortion in domestic animals, influencing human reproductive function, and reducing intraocular pressure in glaucoma.
- PGI_{2} (prostacyclin): IP-(PGI_{2}) (PTGIR) – PTGIR; IP is the receptor for prostacyclin I2; relative potencies in binding to and stimulating IP are: PGI2>>PGD2= PGE2=PGF2α>TXA2 (http://www.guidetopharmacology.org/GRAC/ObjectDisplayForward?objectId=345). Activation of IP is associated with the promotion of capillary permeability in inflammation and allergic responses as well as partial suppression of experimental arthritis in animal models. IP is expressed in at least three alternatively spliced isoforms which differ in the length of their C-terminus and which also activate different cellular signaling pathways and responses.
- TXA_{2} (thromboxane): TP-(TXA_{2}) (TBXA2R) – TBXA2R; TP is the receptor for thromboxane A2; relative potencies in binding to and stimulating TP are TXA2=PGH2>>PGD2=PGE2=PGF2α=PGI2 (http://www.guidetopharmacology.org/GRAC/ObjectDisplayForward?objectId=346&familyId=58&familyType=GPCR). In addition to PGH2, several isoprostanes have been found to be potent stimulators of and to act in part through TP. The TP receptor is expressed in most human cells types as two alternatively spliced isoforms, TP receptor-α and TP receptor β, which differ in the length of their C-terminus tail; these isoforms communicate with different G proteins, undergo heterodimerization, and thereby result in different changes in intracellular signaling (only the TP receptor α is expressed in mice). Activation of TP by TXA2 or isoprostanes is associated with pro-inflammatory responses in cells, tissues, and animal models. TP activation is also associated with the promotion of platelet aggregation and thereby blood clotting and thrombosis.
