= PLAAT3 =

Protein-coding gene in humans

Identifiers
- Aliases: PLAAT3, AdPLA, H-REV107-1, HRASLS3, HREV107, HREV107-1, HREV107-3, HRSL3, phospholipase A2 group XVI, H-REV107, PLAAT-3, PLA2G16, phospholipase A and acyltransferase 3
- External IDs: OMIM: 613867; MGI: 2179715; GeneCards: PLAAT3
Available structures
PDB	Ortholog search: PDBe RCSB
PDB	List of PDB id codes 2KYT, 4DOT, 4FA0, 4Q95
Enzyme activity
EC #	BRENDA	ExPASy	KEGG	MetaCyc
3.1.1.4	↗	↗	↗	↗
3.1.1.32	↗	↗	↗	↗

Gene location (Human)
Chr.	Chromosome 11 (human)
Band	11q12.3-q13.1	Start	63,573,195 bp
Band	11q12.3-q13.1	End	63,616,883 bp

Gene location (Mouse)
Chr.	Chromosome 19 (mouse)
Band	19|19 A	Start	7,534,824 bp
Band	19|19 A	End	7,565,910 bp
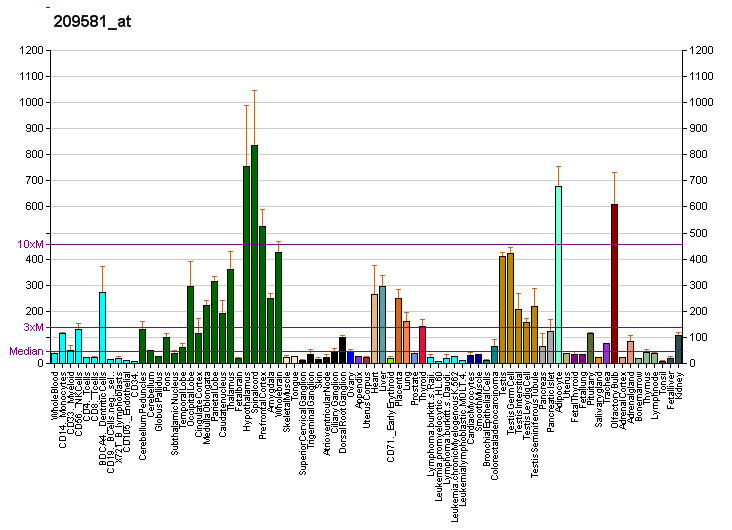
RNA expression pattern
Bgee	Human / Mouse (ortholog); Top expressed in: C1 segment; corpus callosum; adipose tissue; abdominal fat; tibial nerve; inferior ganglion of vagus nerve; left testis; right testis; subcutaneous adipose tissue; external globus pallidus / Top expressed in: white adipose tissue; subcutaneous adipose tissue; sciatic nerve; blood; lens; brown adipose tissue; intercostal muscle; epithelium of lens; tunica adventitia of aorta; soleus muscle; More reference expression data
BioGPS	More reference expression data
Gene ontology
Molecular function	phosphatidylserine 1-acylhydrolase activity; protein binding; 1-acyl-2-lysophosphatidylserine acylhydrolase activity; hydrolase activity; phospholipase A2 activity; acyltransferase activity; phospholipase A1 activity; N-acyltransferase activity
Cellular component	cytoplasm; integral component of membrane; cytosol; membrane; endoplasmic reticulum; perinuclear region of cytoplasm; peroxisome; peroxisomal membrane; cellular component
Biological process	phosphatidylserine acyl-chain remodeling; phosphatidylethanolamine acyl-chain remodeling; lipid metabolism; negative regulation of cell cycle; phosphatidylinositol acyl-chain remodeling; phospholipid biosynthetic process; phosphatidylcholine acyl-chain remodeling; phospholipid metabolic process; triglyceride metabolic process; peroxisome organization; lipid catabolic process; ether lipid metabolic process; regulation of adipose tissue development; response to bacterium; N-acylphosphatidylethanolamine metabolic process
Sources:Amigo / QuickGO
Orthologs
Databases	NCBI: entry; OMA: entry
Species	Human	Mouse
Entrez	11145	225845
Ensembl	ENSG00000176485	ENSMUSG00000060675
UniProt	P53816	Q8R3U1
RefSeq (mRNA)	NM_001128203; NM_007069	NM_139269; NM_001362425
RefSeq (protein)	NP_001121675; NP_009000	NP_644675; NP_001349354
Location (UCSC)	Chr 11: 63.57 – 63.62 Mb	Chr 19: 7.53 – 7.57 Mb
PubMed search
- Wikidata
View/Edit Human	View/Edit Mouse

Adipose Phospholipase A2
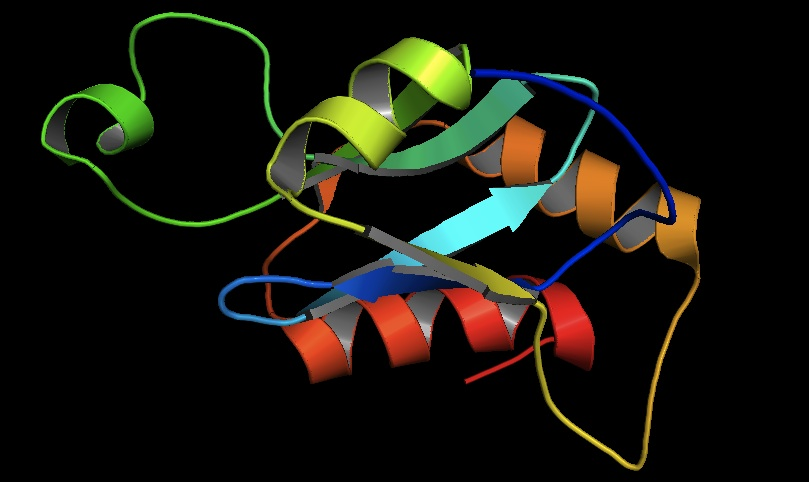
- Crystallographic structure of Adipose Phospholipase A2 (AdPLA)

Identifiers
- EC no.: 3.1.1.4
- CAS no.: 9001-84-7

Databases
- BRENDA: enzyme data
- ExPASy: NiceZyme view
- KEGG: enzyme entry
- MetaCyc: metabolic pathway
- Rhea: reactions
- PDB structures: RCSB PDB PDBe PDBsum
- Gene Ontology: AmiGO / QuickGO
Search
- PMC: articles
- PubMed: articles
- NCBI: proteins

Phospholipase A and acyltransferase 3, also commonly known as adipocyte phospholipase A2 (AdPLA), is an enzyme that in humans is encoded by the PLAAT3 gene (previously PLA2G16).

AdPLA regulates adipocyte lipolysis and release of fatty acids through a G-protein coupled pathway involving prostaglandin and EP3. It has also been reported to play a crucial role in the development of obesity in mouse models.

== Protein/RNA characteristics ==
AdPLA is encoded by a 1.3 kilobase AdPLA messenger RNA and is an 18 kDa protein. It belongs to a superfamily of phospholipase A2 (PLA2) enzymes and is found primarily in adipose tissue.

== Enzyme characteristics ==
AdPLA has been characterized in Group XVI as a separate subgroup of the PLA2 family for its distinct properties from other known PLA2s. It bears similarity to its PLA2 family in phospholipase activity and calcium dependence. Unlike other PLA2 enzymes, AdPLA is expressed predominantly in adipose tissue at higher levels than in the rest of the body, more so in white adipose tissue (WAT) than brown adipose tissue (BAT). Its primary enzymatic function is to catalyze the preferential hydrolysis of phosphatidylcholines at the sn-2 position, generating free fatty acids.

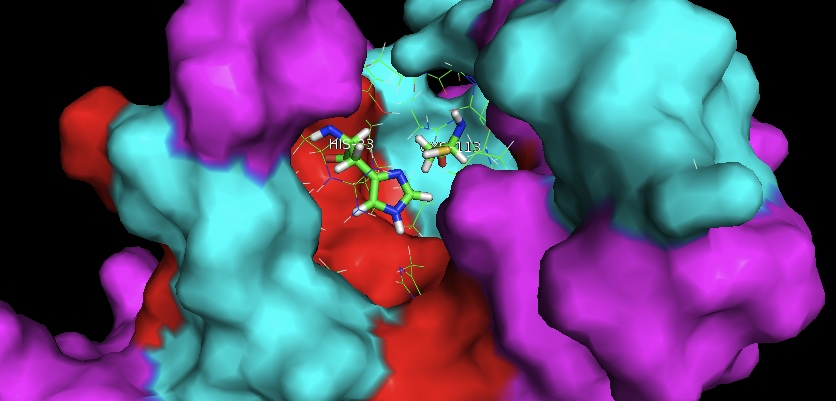
AdPLA active site with labeled His-23 and Cys-113 residues are responsible for AdPLA catalysis.

AdPLA contains a membrane-spanning domain on the C-terminus, which localizes intracellularly for phospholipase activity in proximity to cyclooxygenase 1 (COX-1). His-23 and Cys-113 residues have been shown to be essential in AdPLA activity, which differs from the known His/Asp catalytic dyad or Ser/His/Asp catalytic triad of other PLA2 enzymes. Gln-129 and Asn-112 have also been shown to be necessary in catalysis but their role is not known.

AdPLA activity is calcium and pH dependent. Calcium binds to AdPLA and forms a positively charged oxyanion hole to stabilize a negatively charged transition state, similar to other PLA2 active sites. Whereas asparagine binds to calcium in other PLA2 enzymes, the residue that participates in the creation of oxyanion hole in AdPLA has not yet been verified. Optimum AdPLA activity occurs in relatively basic conditions, between pH 7 and 9, to facilitate formation of a histidine-water complex and subsequent fatty acid hydrolysis.

== Function ==
Studies on AdPLA have shown lipolysis regulation following a G-protein coupled pathway in WAT. WAT is responsible for releasing fatty acids from stored triacylglycerol as energy sources for other tissues which is regulated predominately by AdPLA over other phospholipase A2 enzymes. Lipolysis is inversely related to AdPLA activity. AdPLA catalyzes the rate-limiting step, production of arachidonic acid, for the production of prostaglandins, specifically prostaglandin E2 (PGE2). PGE2 enters the signaling pathway binding to G protein-coupled receptor (EP3) which inhibits adenylyl cyclase. Inhibition of adenylyl cyclase decreases the conversion of cyclic AMP (cAMP) from ATP. Lower levels of cAMP decrease the activity of protein kinase A to phosphorylate, thereby activating, hormone-sensitive lipase. The opposite effect can be reached with inactivated AdPLA, decreasing PGE2 concentration and EP3 activity, leading to an increase in cAMP and lipase activity. This mechanism was postulated on the basis that the predominant signaling protein and receptor present in WAT are PGE2 and EP3. These results were based on a mouse model and although they are mammalian cells, it has not been shown to apply to human cells.

== Effects on obesity ==
Obesity has been attributed to adipocyte hypertrophy, where triacylglycerol synthesis exceeds lipolysis, resulting in elevated triacylglycerol storage. Previous studies have associated obesity with endocrine factors and have led pharmacological work toward hormone regulation. Studies on AdPLA deficient mice have shown that the enzyme increased lipolysis in WAT as a result of decreased lipolysis regulation. AdPLA deficiency was shown to reduce adipose tissue mass for mice in both standard and high fat diets. Adipocyte hypotrophy was attributed primarily to reduced triacylglyceride content in WAT from lipolysis, while adipocyte differentiation did not play a role in reduced adipose tissue despite the effects of prostaglandins on adipogenesis. AdPLA deficiency also led to higher oxygen consumption due to the upregulation of genes involved in oxidative metabolism, increasing fatty acid oxidation. One upregulated gene in particular, uncoupling protein-1 (UCP1), has been shown to reduce diet-induced obesity.

Studies on AdPLA deficient and genetically obese mice (leptin deficiency) have also shown similar effects, reduced adipose tissue mass and increased lipolysis by reduction in PGE2 and EP3 activity. Fatty acid oxidation was also found to increase to levels of wild-type mice that were deficient in non-AdPLA deficient obese mice. Body composition also showed a higher percentage of water and lean tissue mass compared to non-AdPLA deficient obese mice.

AdPLA deficiency also demonstrated adverse effects, increasing ectopic triglyceride storage and insulin resistance. Liver enlargement was attributed to higher fatty acid uptake and triacylglycerol content. Insulin stimulated glucose uptake and metabolism were also blunted in AdPLA deficiency, decreasing glycolysis and glycogen synthesis. Despite these side effects, AdPLA is a novel breakthrough in studying autocrine and paracrine action of AdPLA in regulating obesity and fat metabolism. These side effects have triggered new studies to be performed on reduction of AdPLA function as opposed to complete ablation.
