= C23H28O6 =

The molecular formula C_{23}H_{28}O_{6} (molar mass: 400.46 g/mol, exact mass: 400.1886 u) may refer to:

- Enprostil
- Schisandrin B
