= Prostaglandin EP3 receptor =

Protein found in humans

PTGER3

Identifiers
- Aliases: PTGER3, EP3, EP3-I, EP3-II, EP3-III, EP3-IV, EP3e, PGE2-R, EP3-VI, Prostaglandin E receptor 3, lnc003875
- External IDs: OMIM: 176806; MGI: 97795; GeneCards: PTGER3

Gene location (Human)
| Chr. | Chromosome 1 (human) |
| Band | 1p31.1 | Start | 70,852,353 bp |
| Band | 1p31.1 | End | 71,047,816 bp |

Gene location (Mouse)
| Chr. | Chromosome 3 (mouse) |
| Band | 3 H4|3 81.32 cM | Start | 157,272,529 bp |
| Band | 3 H4|3 81.32 cM | End | 157,351,525 bp |
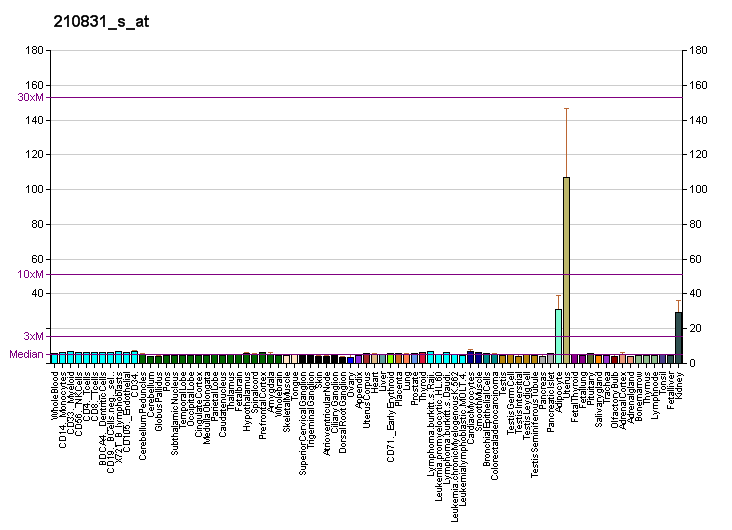

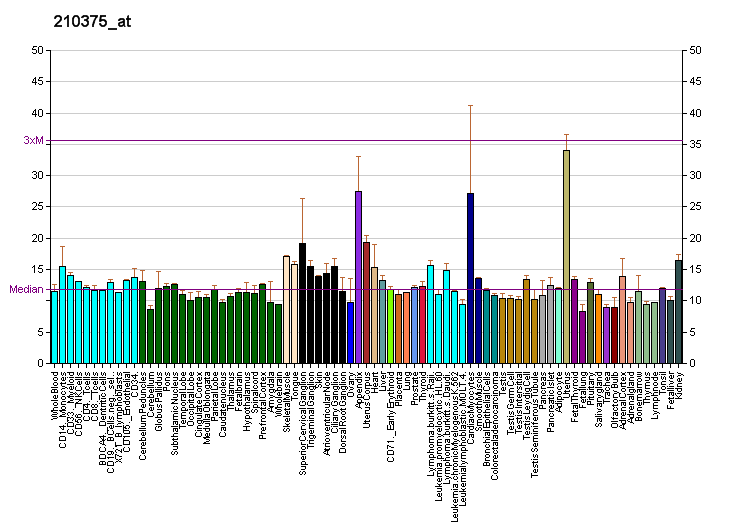

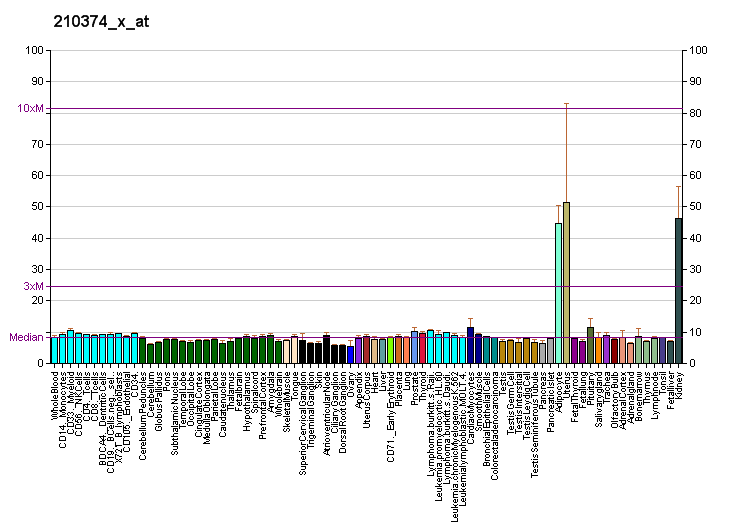
RNA expression pattern
| Bgee | Human / Mouse (ortholog); Top expressed in: kidney tubule; human kidney; body of uterus; renal medulla; Skeletal muscle tissue of rectus abdominis; tail of epididymis; myometrium; vena cava; Epithelium of choroid plexus; adipose tissue / Top expressed in: tunica adventitia of aorta; lumbar spinal ganglion; right kidney; barrel cortex; brown adipose tissue; white adipose tissue; subcutaneous adipose tissue; tunica media of zone of aorta; seminal vesicula; intercostal muscle; More reference expression data |
| BioGPS | More reference expression data |
Gene ontology
| Molecular function | G protein-coupled receptor activity; prostaglandin receptor activity; signal transducer activity; prostaglandin E receptor activity; protein binding |
| Cellular component | nuclear envelope; membrane; plasma membrane; integral component of plasma membrane; integral component of membrane |
| Biological process | G protein-coupled receptor signaling pathway; positive regulation of fever generation; cell death; signal transduction; negative regulation of gastric acid secretion; phospholipase C-activating G protein-coupled receptor signaling pathway; intestine smooth muscle contraction; inflammatory response; adenylate cyclase-activating G protein-coupled receptor signaling pathway; positive regulation of cytosolic calcium ion concentration |
Sources:Amigo / QuickGO
Orthologs
| Databases | NCBI: entry; OMA: entry |
| Species | Human | Mouse |
| Entrez | 5733 | 19218 |
| Ensembl | ENSG00000050628 | ENSMUSG00000040016 |
| UniProt | P43115 | P30557 |
| RefSeq (mRNA) | NM_000957; NM_001126044; NM_198712; NM_198713; NM_198714 NM_198715; NM_198716; NM_198717; NM_198718; NM_198719; NM_198720 | NM_011196; NM_001359745 |
| RefSeq (protein) | NP_001119516; NP_942007; NP_942008; NP_942009; NP_942010 NP_942011; NP_942012 | n/a |
| Location (UCSC) | Chr 1: 70.85 – 71.05 Mb | Chr 3: 157.27 – 157.35 Mb |
| PubMed search |
- Wikidata
| View/Edit Human | View/Edit Mouse |

Prostaglandin EP_{3} receptor (EP_{3}, 53kDa), is a prostaglandin receptor for prostaglandin E_{2} (PGE_{2}) encoded by the human gene PTGER3; it is one of four identified EP receptors, the others being EP_{1}, EP_{2}, and EP_{4}, all of which bind with and mediate cellular responses to PGE_{2} and also, but generally with lesser affinity and responsiveness, certain other prostanoids (see Prostaglandin receptors). EP has been implicated in various physiological and pathological responses.

== Gene ==
The PTGER3 gene is located on human chromosome 1 at position p31.1 (i.e. 1p31.1), contains 10 exons, and codes for a G protein coupled receptor (GPCR) of the rhodopsin-like receptor family, Subfamily A14 (see rhodopsin-like receptors#Subfamily A14). PTGER3 codes for at least 8 different isoforms in humans, i.e. PTGER3-1 to PGGER3-8 (i.e., EP_{3}-1, EP_{3}-2, EP_{3}-3, EP_{3}-4, EP_{3}-5, EP_{3}-6, EP_{3}-7, and EP_{3}-8), while Ptger3 codes for at least 3 isoforms in mice, Ptger1-Ptger3 (i.e. Ep_{3}-α, Ep_{3}-β, and Ep_{3}-γ). These isoforms are variants made by Alternative splicing conducted at the 5'-end of DNA to form proteins that vary at or near their C-terminus. Since these isoforms different in their tissue expressions as well as the signaling pathways which they activate, they may vary in the functions that they perform. Further studies are needed to examine functional differences among these isoforms.

== Expression ==
EP_{3} is widely distributed in humans. Its protein and/or mRNA is expressed in kidney (i.e. glomeruli, Tamm-Horsfall protein negative late distal convoluted tubules, connecting segments, cortical and medullary collecting ducts, media and endothelial cells of arteries and arterioles); stomach (vascular smooth muscle and gastric fundus mucosal cells); thalamus (anterior, ventromedial, laterodorsal, paraventricular and central medial nuclei); intestinal mucosal epithelia at the apex of crypts; myometrium (stromal cells, endothelial cells, and, in pregnancy, placenta, chorion, and amnion); mouth gingival fibroblasts; and eye (corneal endothelium and keratocytes, trabecular cells, ciliary epithelium, and conjunctival and iridal stroma cells, and retinal Müller cells).

== Ligands ==
=== Activating ligands ===
Standard prostanoids have the following relative efficacies in binding to and activating EP_{3}: PGE_{2}>PGF2α=PGI2>PGD2=TXA2. Prostglandin E_{1} (PGE_{1}), which has one less double bond than PGE_{2}, has the same binding affinity and potency for EP_{3} as PGE_{2}. PGE_{2} has extreme high affinity (dissociation constant Kd=0.3 nM) for EP_{3}. Several synthetic compounds, e.g. sulprostone, SC-46275, MB-28767, and ONO-AE-248, bind to and stimulate with high potency EP_{3} but unlike PGE_{2} have the advantage of being highly selective for this receptor over other EP receptors and are relatively resistant to being metabolically degraded. They are in development as drugs for the potential treatment of stomach ulcers in humans.

=== Inhibiting ligands ===
Numerous synthetic compounds have been found to be highly selective in binding to but not stimulating EP_{3}. These receptor antagonist DG-O41, L798,106, and ONO-AE3-240, block EP_{3} from responding to PGE_{2} or other agonists of this receptor, including sulprostone, ONO-AE-248 and TEI-3356. They are in development primarily as anti-thrombotics, i.e. drugs to treat pathological blood clotting in humans.

== Mechanism of cell activation ==
EP_{3} is classified as an inhibitory type of prostanoid receptor based on its ability, upon activation, to inhibit the activation of adenylyl cyclase stimulated by relaxant types of prostanoid receptors viz., prostaglandin DP, E2, and E4 receptors (see Prostaglandin receptors). When initially bound to PGE_{2} or other of its agonists, it mobilizes G proteins containing various types of G proteins, depending upon the particular EP_{3} isoform: EP_{3α} and EP_{3β} isoforms activate Gi alpha subunit (i.e. Gα_{i})-G beta-gamma complexes (i.e. Gα_{i})-G_{βγ}) complexes) as well as Gα_{12}-G_{βγ} complexes while the EP_{3γ} isoform activates in addition to and the Gα_{i}- G_{βγ} complexes Gα_{i}- G_{βγ} complexes. (G protein linkages for the other EP_{3} isoforms have not been defined.) In consequence, complexes dissociate into Gα_{i}, Gα_{12}, G_{s} and G_{βγ} components which proceed to activate cell signaling pathways that lead functional responses viz., pathways that activate phospholipase C to convert cellular phospholipids to diacylglycerol which promotes the activation of certain isoforms of protein kinase C, pathways that elevated cellular cytosolic Ca^{2+} which thereby regulate Ca^{2+}-sensitive cell signaling molecules, and pathways that inhibit adenylyl cyclase which thereby lowers cellular levels of cyclic adenosine monophosphate (cAMP) to reduce the activity of cAMP-dependent signaling molecules.

== Functions ==
Studies using animals genetically engineered to lack EP_{3} and supplemented by studies examining the actions of EP_{3} receptor antagonists and agonists in animals as well as animal and human tissues indicate that this receptor serves various functions. However, an EP_{3} receptor function found in these studies does not necessarily indicate that in does do in humans. For example, EP_{3} receptor activation promotes duodenal secretion in mice; this function is mediated by EP_{4} receptor activation in humans. EP receptor functions can vary with species and most of the functional studies cited here have not translated their animal and tissue models to humans.

=== Digestive system ===
The secretion of HCO^{−}_{3} (bicarbonate anion) from Brunner's glands of the duodenum serves to neutralize the highly acidified digestive products released from the stomach and thereby prevents ulcerative damage to the small intestine. Activation of EP_{3} and EP_{4} receptors in mice stimulates this secretion but in humans activation of EP_{4}, not EP_{3}, appears responsible for this secretion. These two prostanoid receptors also stimulate intestinal mucous secretion, a function which may also act to reduce acidic damage to the duodenum.

=== Fever ===
EP_{3}-deficient mice as well as mice selectively deleted of EP_{3} expression in the brain's median preoptic nucleus fail to develop fever in response to endotoxins (i.e. bacteria-derived lipopolysaccharide) or the host-derived regulator of body temperature, IL-1β. The ability of endotoxins and IL-1β but not that of PGE_{2} to trigger fever is blocked by inhibitors of nitric oxide and PG_{2}. EP_{3}-deficient mice exhibit normal febrile responses to stress, interleukin-8, and macrophage inflammatory protein-1beta (MIP-1β). It is suggested that these findings indicate that a) activation of the EP_{3} receptor suppresses the GABAergic inhibitory tone that the preoptic hypothalamus has on thermogenic effector cells in the brain; b) endotoxin and IL-1β simulate the production of nitric oxide which in turn causes the production of PGE_{2} and thereby the EP_{3}-dependent fever-producing; c) other factors such as stress, interleukin 8, and MIP-1β trigger fever independently of EP_{3}; and d) inhibition of the PGE_{2}-EP_{3} pathway underlies the ability of aspirin and other nonsteroidal anti-inflammatory drugs to reduce fever caused by inflammation in animals and, possibly, humans.

=== Allergy ===
In a mouse model of ovalbumin-induced asthma, a selective EP_{3} agonist reduced airway cellularity, mucus, and bronchoconstriction responses to methacholine. In this model, EP_{3}-deficient mice, upon ovalbumin challenge, exhibited worsened allergic inflammation as measured by increased airway eosinophils, neutrophils, lymphocytes, and pro-allergic cytokines (i.e. interleukin 4, interleukin 5, and interleukin 13) as compared to wild type mice. EP_{3} receptor-deficient mice and/or wild type mice treated with an EP_{3} receptor agonist are similarly protected from allergic responses in models of allergic conjunctivitis and contact hypersensitivity. Thus, EP_{3} appears to serve an important role in reducing allergic reactivity at least in mice.

=== Cough ===
Studies with mice, guinea pig, and human tissues and in guinea pigs indicate that PGE_{2} operates through EP_{3} to trigger cough responses. Its mechanism of action involves activation and/or sensitization of TRPV1 (as well as TRPA1) receptors, presumably by an indirect mechanism. Genetic polymorphism in the EP_{3} receptor (rs11209716), has been associated with ACE inhibitor-induce cough in humans. The use of EP_{3} receptor antagonists may warrant study for the treatment of chronic cough in humans.

=== Blood pressure ===
Activation of EP_{3} receptors contracts vascular beds including rat mesentery artery, rat tail artery, guinea-pig aorta, rodent and human pulmonary artery, and murine renal and brain vasculature. Mice depleted of EP_{3} are partially protected from brain injury consequential to experimentally induced cerebral ischemia. Furthermore, rodent studies indicate that agonist-induced activation of EP_{3} in the brain by intra-cerebroventricular injection of PGE_{2} or selective EP_{3} agonist cause hypertension; a highly selective EP_{3} receptor antagonist blocked this PGE2-induced response. These studies, which examine a sympatho-excitatory response (i.e. responses wherein brain excitation such as stroke raises blood pressure) suggest that certain hypertension responses in humans are mediated, at least in part, by EP_{3}.

=== Vascular permeability ===
Model studies indicate that PG_{2} (but not specific antigens or IgE cross-linkage) stimulates mouse and human mast cells to release histamine by an EP_{3}-dependent mechanism. Furthermore, EP_{3}-deficient mice fail to develop increased capillary permeability and tissue swelling in response to EP_{3} receptor agonists and the metabolic precursor to PGE_{2}, arachidonic acid. It is suggested, based on these and other less direct studies, that PGE_{2}-EP_{3} signaling may be responsible for the skin swelling and edema provoked by topical 5-aminolaevulinic acid photodynamic therapy, contact with chemical irritants, infection with pathogens, and various skin disorders in humans.

=== Blood clotting ===
Activation of EP_{3} receptors on the blood platelets of mice, monkeys, and humans enhances their aggregation, degranulation, and blood clot-promoting responsiveness to a wide array of physiological (e.g. thrombin) and pathological (e.g. atheromatous plaques. (In contrast, activation of either the EP_{2} or EP_{3} receptor inhibits platelet activation) Inhibition of EP_{3} with the selective EP_{3} receptor antagonist, DG-041, has been shown to prevent blood clotting but not to alter hemostasis or blood loss in mice and in inhibit platelet activation responses in human whole blood while not prolonging bleeding times when given to human volunteers. The drug has been proposed to be of potential clinical use for the prevention of blood clotting while causing little or no bleeding tendencies.

=== Pain ===
EP_{3} deficient mice exhibit significant reductions in: hyperalgesic writhing (i.e. squirming) responses to acetic acid administration; acute but not chronic Herpes simplex infection-induced pain; and HIV-1 envelope glycoprotein GP120 intrathecal injection-induced tactile allodynia. Furthermore, a selective EP_{3} agonist, ONO-AE-248, induces hyperalgesia pain in wild type but not EP_{3}-deficient mice. While pain perception is a complex phenomenon involving multiple causes and multiple receptors including EP_{2}, EP_{1}, LTB_{4}, bradykinin, nerve growth factor, and other receptors, these studies indicate that EP_{3} receptors contribute to the perception of at least certain types of pain in mice and may also do so in humans.

=== Cancer ===
Studies of the direct effects of EP_{3} receptor activation on cancer in animal and tissue models give contradictory results suggesting that this receptor does not play an important role in carcinogenesis. However, some studies suggest an indirect pro-carcinogenic function for the EP_{3} receptor: The growth and metastasis of implanted Lewis lung carcinoma cells, a mouse lung cancer cell line, is suppressed in EP_{3} receptor deficient mice. This effect was associated with a reduction in the levels of vascular endothelial growth factor and matrix metalloproteinase-9 expression in the tumor's stroma; expression of the pro-lymphangiogenic growth factor VEGF-C and its receptor, VEGFR3; and a tumor-associated angiogenesis and lymphangiogenesis.

== Clinical significance ==
=== Therapeutics ===
Many drugs that act on EP_{3} and, often, other prostaglandin receptors, are in clinical use. A partial list of these includes:

- Misoprostol, an EP_{3} and EP_{4} receptor agonist, is in clinical use to prevent ulcers, to induce labor in pregnancy, medical abortion, and late miscarriage, and to prevent and treat postpartum bleeding (see Misoprostol).
- Sulprostone, relatively selective EP_{3} receptor agonist with a weak ability to stimulate the EP_{1} receptor is in clinical use for inducing medical abortion and ending pregnancy after fetal death (see Sulprostone).
- Iloprost activates EP_{2}, EP_{3}, and EP_{4} receptors; it is in clinical use to treat diseases involving pathological constriction of blood vessels such as pulmonary hypertension, Raynauds disease, and scleroderma. Presumably, Iloprost works by stimulating EP_{2}, and EP_{4} receptors which have vasodilation actions.

Other drugs are in various stages of clinical development or have been proposed to be tested for clinical development. A sampling of these includes:

- Enprostil, which binds to and activates primarily the EP_{3} receptor, was found in a prospective multicenter randomized controlled trial conducted in Japan to significantly improve the effects of cimetidine in treating gastric ulcer. It is considered to be an efficient and safe treatment for gastric and duodenal ulcers.
- ONO-9054 (Sepetoprost), a dual an EP_{3}/Prostaglandin F receptor agonist, is in phase 1 clinical trial studies for the treatment of ocular hypertension and open-angle glaucoma.
- DG-041, a highly selective EP_{3} antagonist, has been proposed to warrant further study as anti-thrombosis agent.
- GR 63799X, MB-28767, ONO-AE-248, and TEI-3356 are putative EP_{3} receptor-selective agonists that have been proposed to warrant further study to treat and/or prevent various types of cardiovascular diseases.

=== Genomic studies ===
The single nucleotide polymorphism (SNP) in the PTGER3, rs977214 A/G variant has been associated with an increase in pre-term births in two populations of European ancestry; the SNP variant -1709T>A in PTGER3 has been associated with aspirin-exacerbated respiratory disease in a Korean population; and 6 SNP variants have been associated with development of the Steven Johnson syndrome and its more severe form, toxic epidermal necrolysis, in a Japanese population.

== See also ==
- Eicosanoid receptor
- Prostaglandin E2 receptor 1 (EP1)
- Prostaglandin E2 receptor 2 (EP2)
- Prostaglandin E2 receptor 4 (EP4)
