= Prostaglandin receptor =

Cell surface receptor

Prostaglandin receptors or prostanoid receptors represent a sub-class of cell surface membrane receptors that are regarded as the primary receptors for one or more of the classical, naturally occurring prostanoids viz., prostaglandin D2, (i.e. PGD2), PGE2, PGF2alpha, prostacyclin (PGI2), thromboxane A2 (TXA2), and PGH2. They are named based on the prostanoid to which they preferentially bind and respond, e.g. the receptor responsive to PGI2 at lower concentrations than any other prostanoid is named the Prostacyclin receptor (IP). One exception to this rule is the receptor for thromboxane A2 (TP) which binds and responds to PGH2 and TXA2 equally well.

All of the prostanoid receptors are G protein-coupled receptors belonging to the Subfamily A14 of the rhodopsin-like receptor family except for the Prostaglandin DP2 receptor which is more closely related in amino acid sequence and functionality to chemotactic factor receptors such as the receptors for C5a and leukotriene B4.

Prostanoid receptors bind and respond principally to metabolites of the straight chain polyunsaturated fatty acid (PUFA), arachidonic acid. These metabolites contain two double bonds and are named series 2 prostanoids, i.e. PGD2, PGE2, PGF2α, PGI2, TXA2 and PGH2. However, the same enzymes that metabolize arachidonic acid to series 2 prostanoids similarly metabolize two other straight chain PUFAs: they metabolize gamma-Linolenic acid, which has one less double bond than arachidonic acid, to series 1 prostanoids (PGD1, PGE1, etc.), which have one less double bond than the series 2 prostanoids, and they metabolize eicosapentaenoic acid, which has one more double bond than arachidonic acid, to series 3 prostanoids (PGD3, PGE3, etc.), which have one more double bond than the series 2 prostanoids. In general, receptors for the series 2 prostanoids also bind with and respond to the series 1 and 3 prostanoids. Typically, prostanoid receptors show somewhat less affinity and responsiveness to the 1 and 3 series prostanoids.

There are 9 established prostanoid receptors. The following table gives these receptors: a) full name; b) shortened names; c) activating prostanoids (presented in order of decreasing potencies); d) time-honored classification as contractile (i.e. contracting smooth muscle), relaxant (i.e. relaxing smooth muscle), or inhibitory (i.e. inhibiting adenyl cyclase (AC) production of cyclic AMP [cAMP]); e) G proteins types to which they link and activate, i.e. those containing the Gs alpha subunit, Gi alpha subunit, Gq alpha subunit and/or G12 subunit; and f) signaling pathways which they regulate including Adenyl cyclase which when activated increases cellular cAMP and when inhibited reduces the cellular levels of this secondary messenger; Phosphoinositide 3-kinase which when activated is responsible for forming phosphatidylinositol 3-phosphate, phosphatidylinositol (3,4)-bisphosphate, and phosphatidylinositol (3,4,5)-trisphosphate secondary messengers; Phospholipase C (PLC) which when activated is responsible for forming Inositol trisphosphate (IP3) and diacylglycerol secondary messengers that are, respectively, responsible for raising the levels of Ca^{2+} in the cellular cytosol to control the activity of Ca^{2+}-cell signaling agents and for activating protein kinase C (PKC) secondary messengers; and Extracellular signal-regulated kinases (ERK), p38 mitogen-activated protein kinases (p38 Mpk), and cAMP response element-binding protein (CREB) which when activated phosphorylate and thereby influence the activity of key proteins that govern cell function.

Full name	shortened name	activating prostanoids	classification	G protein linkage	pathways
Prostaglandin DP1 receptor	DP_{1}	PGD2>>PGE2>PGF2α>PGI2=TXA2	relaxant	Gs alpha subunit	activates AC, increases cAMP, raises Ca^{2+}
Prostaglandin DP2 receptor	DP_{2}	PGD2>>PGF2α=PGE2>PGI2=TXA2	?	Gi alpha subunit	inhibits AC to depress cAMP levels
Prostaglandin EP1 receptor	EP_{1}	PGE2>PGF2α=PGI2>PGD2=TXA2	contractile	Gq alpha subunit	stimulates PLC, IP3, PKC, ERK, p38 Mpk, and CREB
Prostaglandin EP2 receptor	EP_{2}	PGE2>PGF2α=PGI2>PGD2=TXA2	relaxant	Gs alpha subunit	stimulates AC, raises cAMP, stimulates beta catenin and Glycogen synthase kinase 3
Prostaglandin EP3 receptor	EP_{3}	PGE2>PGF2α,PGI2>PGD2=TXA2	inhibitory	Gi & G12 subunit	inhibits AC, decreases cAMP, stimulates PLC & IP3, raises Ca^{2+}
Prostaglandin EP4 receptor	EP_{4}	PGE2>PGF2α=PGI2>PGD2=TXA2	relaxant	Gs alpha subunit	stimulates AC, PKA, PI3K, AKT, ERK, p38 Mpk, & CREB; raises cAMP
Prostaglandin F2α receptor	FP	PGF2α>PGD2>PGE2>PGI2=TXA2	contractile	Gq alpha subunit	stimulates PLC, IP3, & PKC; raises Ca^{2+}
Prostacyclin I2 receptor	IP	PGI2>>PGD2=PGE2=PGF2α>TXA2	relaxant	Gs alpha subunit	stimulates AC & PKA; raises cAMP
Thromboxane A2 receptor	TP	TXA=PGH2>>PGD2=PGE2=PGF2α=PGI2	contractile	Gq alpha subunit	stimulates PLC & IP3; raises Ca^{2+}

There is indirect evidence for a second PGI2 receptor in BEAS-2B human airway epithelial cells but this finding has not been collaborated and the putative receptor has not been otherwise defined.

== See also ==
- Prostanoid receptor
- Eicosanoid receptor
- Prostaglandin
