= Prostaglandin EP4 receptor =

Protein-coding gene in the species Homo sapiens

PTGER4

Identifiers
- Aliases: PTGER4, EP4, EP4R, EP4 receptor, prostaglandin E receptor 4
- External IDs: OMIM: 601586; MGI: 104311; GeneCards: PTGER4

Gene location (Human)
Chr.	Chromosome 5 (human)
Band	5p13.1	Start	40,679,915 bp
Band	5p13.1	End	40,693,735 bp

Gene location (Mouse)
Chr.	Chromosome 15 (mouse)
Band	15 A1|15 1.99 cM	Start	5,236,142 bp
Band	15 A1|15 1.99 cM	End	5,273,668 bp
RNA expression pattern
Bgee	Human / Mouse (ortholog); Top expressed in: palpebral conjunctiva; jejunal mucosa; glomerulus; mucosa of sigmoid colon; metanephric glomerulus; bronchial epithelial cell; visceral pleura; synovial joint; germinal epithelium; parietal pleura / Top expressed in: renal corpuscle; hair follicle; conjunctival fornix; atrioventricular valve; blood; mesenteric lymph nodes; uterus; Paneth cell; left colon; ileum; More reference expression data
BioGPS	n/a
Gene ontology
Molecular function	G protein-coupled receptor activity; prostaglandin receptor activity; signal transducer activity; protein binding; prostaglandin E receptor activity
Cellular component	integral component of membrane; membrane; plasma membrane; intracellular anatomical structure
Biological process	negative regulation of integrin activation; positive regulation of inflammatory response; adenylate cyclase-modulating G protein-coupled receptor signaling pathway; ERK1 and ERK2 cascade; response to mechanical stimulus; negative regulation of eosinophil extravasation; regulation of stress fiber assembly; JNK cascade; cellular response to mechanical stimulus; response to lipopolysaccharide; immune response; regulation of ossification; T-helper cell differentiation; bone development; negative regulation of inflammatory response; signal transduction; cellular response to prostaglandin E stimulus; G protein-coupled receptor signaling pathway; inflammatory response; adenylate cyclase-activating G protein-coupled receptor signaling pathway; positive regulation of cytosolic calcium ion concentration
Sources:Amigo / QuickGO
Orthologs
Databases	NCBI: entry; OMA: entry
Species	Human	Mouse
Entrez	5734	19219
Ensembl	ENSG00000171522	ENSMUSG00000039942
UniProt	P35408	P32240
RefSeq (mRNA)	NM_000958	NM_001136079; NM_008965
RefSeq (protein)	NP_000949	NP_001129551; NP_032991
Location (UCSC)	Chr 5: 40.68 – 40.69 Mb	Chr 15: 5.24 – 5.27 Mb
PubMed search
- Wikidata
View/Edit Human	View/Edit Mouse

Prostaglandin E_{2} receptor 4 (EP_{4}) is a prostaglandin receptor for prostaglandin E2 (PGE_{2}) encoded by the PTGER4 gene in humans. It is one of four identified EP receptors, the others being EP_{1}, EP_{2}, and EP_{3}, all of which bind with and mediate cellular responses to PGE_{2} and also, but generally with lesser affinity and responsiveness, certain other prostanoids (see Prostaglandin receptors). EP_{4} has been implicated in various physiological and pathological responses in animal models and humans.

== Gene ==
The PTGER4 gene is located on human chromosome 5p13.1 at position p13.1 (i.e. 5p13.1), contains 7 exons, and codes for a G protein-coupled receptor (GPCR) of the rhodopsin-like receptor family, Subfamily A14 (see rhodopsin-like receptors#Subfamily A14).

== Expression ==
In humans, mRNA for EP4 has been detected by northern blotting in the heart and small intestine and to lesser extents in lung, kidney, thymus, uterus, dorsal root ganglions, and brain. EP4 protein is found in humans as measured by immunochemistry in pulmonary veins; kidney glomeruli and tunica media of kidney arteries; corpus cavernosum of the penis; carotid artery atherosclerotic plaques; Abdominal aorta aneurysms; corneal endothelium, corneal keratocytes, trabecular cells, ciliary epithelium, conjunctival stromal cells, and iridal stromal cells of the eye; and gingival fibroblasts.

== Ligands ==
=== Activating ligands ===
Standard prostanoids have the following relative efficacies in binding to and activating EP_{4}: PGE_{2}>PGF2α=PGI2>PGD2=TXA2. Prostaglandin E1 (PGE_{1}), which has one less double bond than PGE_{2}, has the same binding affinity and potency for EP_{4}, both PGs having high affinity (Ki=3 nM) (http://www.guidetopharmacology.org/GRAC/ObjectDisplayForward?objectId=343). Several synthetic compounds, e.g. 1-hydroxy-PGE_{1}, rivenprost (ONO-4819), OOG-308, ONO-AE1-329, AGN205203, ONO-4819, CP-734,432m AE1-329, SC-19220, SC-51089, and EP4RAG bind to and stimulate EP_{4} but unlike PGE_{2} have the advantage of being selective for this receptor over other EP receptors and are relatively resistant to being metabolically degraded. They are in development as drugs for the potential treatment of various diseases including ulcerative colitis, Alzheimer's disease, osteoporosis, and certain cardiovascular diseases.

=== Inhibiting ligands ===
Inhibitory receptor antagonists for EP_{4}, including grapiprant (CJ-023,423), ONO-AE3-208, GW627368X, AH23848, and ONO-AE2-227, are in development for possible clinical use as inhibitors of the progression of prostate, breast, colon, and lung cancers.

== Mechanism of cell activation ==
EP_{4} is classified as a relaxant type of prostaglandin receptor based on its ability, upon activation, to relax the contraction of certain smooth muscle preparations and smooth muscle-containing tissues that have been pre-contracted by stimulation. When bound to PGE_{2} or other of its agonists, it mobilizes G proteins containing the Gs alpha subunit (i.e. Gα_{s})-G beta-gammaes (i.e. G_{βγ}) complex. The complex then dissociate into its Gα_{s} and G_{βγ} components which act to regulate cell signaling pathways. In particular, Gα_{s} stimulates adenyl cyclase to raise cellular levels of cAMP; cAMP activates PKA, a kinase which in turn activates signaling molecules, in particular, the transcription factor, CREB. Activated CREB stimulates the expression of genes such as c-fos, somatostatin, and corticotropin-releasing hormone that regulate cellular proliferation, cellular differentiation, cellular survival, and angiogenesis. EP_{4} activation of G proteins also activate PI3K/AKT/mTOR, ERK, and p38 MAPK pathways. Activation of ERK induces expression of EGR1, a transcription factor which controls transcription of genes involved in cellular differentiation and mitogenesis. EP_{4} also interacts with Prostaglandin E receptor 4-associated protein (EPRAP) to inhibit phosphorylation of the proteasome protein, p105, thereby suppressing a cells ability to activate nuclear factor kappa B, a transcription factor that controls genes coding for cytokines and other elements that regulate inflammation, cell growth, and cell survival (see NF-κB#Structure). The activation of these pathways lead to variety of different types of functional responses depending on cell type, the pathways available in different cell types, and numerous other factors; EP_{4} activation may therefore have diverse effects on cell function depending on these factors. In many respects, EP_{4} actions resemble those of another type of another relaxant prostanoid receptor, EP_{2} but differs from the contractile prostanoid receptors, EP_{1} and EP_{3} receptors which mobilize G proteins containing the Gα_{q}-Gβγ complex.

Following its activation, EP_{4} undergoes homologous desensitization. That is, EP_{4} becomes insensitive to further activation and internalizes. This effect limits the duration and extent to which EP_{4} can stimulate cells. Agents which activate certain isoforms of protein kinase C can also desensitize EP_{4} by a process termed heterologous desensitization.

== Functions ==
Studies using animals genetically engineered to lack EP_{4} and supplemented by studies examining the actions of EP_{4} receptor antagonists and agonists in animals as well as animal and human tissues indicate that this receptor serves various functions. However, an EP_{4} receptor function found in these studies does not necessarily indicate that in does so in humans since EP receptor functions can vary between species.

=== Ductus arteriosus ===
EP_{4} plays a critical role in postnatal closure of the ductus arteriosus as defined in mice lacking a functional gene for this receptor, i.e. EP_{4}(-/-) mice (see Knockout mouse). About 95% of EP_{4}(-/-) mice die within 3 days of birth due to the pulmonary congestion and heart failure caused by a patent ductus arteriosus. The ductus operates in the fetus to shunt blood from the pulmonary artery to the proximal descending aorta thereby allowing blood from the heart's right ventricle to bypass the fetus's non-functioning lungs. The ductus must close at birth to allow blood flow into the lungs. In mice, this is accomplished by turning off the mechanism which maintains the ductus's patency. Continuous activation of EP_{4} by PGE_{2} keeps the ductus open in the fetus; at birth, however, levels of EP_{4} and PGE_{2} in the smooth muscle cells and media in mouse ductus fall. This closes the ductus thereby establishing normal post-fetal circulation of blood through the lungs. Based on studies using EP receptor agonists and receptor antagonists, EP_{2} in mice and, at least in lambs, EP_{3} may play minor parts in maintaining patency of the ductus. These studies also appear relevant to humans: nonsteroidal anti-inflammatory drugs, particularly indomethacin, are used to reduce prostaglandin production and thereby close the ductus in neonates, infants, and older patients with Patent ductus arteriosus; furthermore, prostaglandins or their analogs are used to keep the ductus open in neonates with congenital heart defects such as Transposition of the great arteries until corrective surgery can be performed (see Ductus arteriosus#Disorder: Patent ductus arteriosus).

To allow further studies of EP_{4} function, colonies obtained by cross-breeding the 5% of mice surviving EP_{4} deletion are used.

=== Inflammation ===
Activation of EP_{4} suppresses the production of IL-12p70 and increases IL-23 thereby promoting development of IL-17-producing Th17 cells, a subset of pro-inflammatory T helper cells that serves to maintain mucosal barriers, clear mucosal surfaces of pathogens, and contribute to autoimmune and inflammatory disorders. Its activation also: a) supports the development of Regulatory T cells (i.e. suppressor T cells that modulate the immune system to maintain tolerance to self-antigens and prevent autoimmune disease); b) stimulate Dendritic cells (i.e. antigen-presenting cells located primarily in the skin and mucous membranes) to mature, migrate, and direct the early stage of immune responses; c) inhibit antibody-producing B cells from proliferating; d) suppresses the development of Atherosclerosis plaques by promoting the death (i.e. apoptosis) of plaque-bound pro-inflammatory macrophages; e) increases the survival of neurons in an inflammation-based model of Alzheimer's disease; f) increases local arteriole and capillary blood flow to cause, for example, site-specific signs of inflammation such as redness, heat, and swelling in rodent models; and g) suppresses sensory Dorsal root ganglion neurons from signaling inflammation-induced pain (i.e. allodynia and hyperalgesia) and has been used successfully to block the osteoarthritis pain in dogs.

=== Gastrointestinal tract ===
EP_{4} receptors are highly expressed in the small intestine and colon. Mice lacking this receptor or treated with a selective EP_{4} antagonist proved to be far more susceptible to the development of dextran sodium sulphate (DSS)-induced colitis and to be protected from developing the colitis by pre-treatment with EP_{4}-selective agonists (ONO-AE1-734 and AGN205203). The DDS-inflicted lesions were associated with defective colon mucosa barrier function along with the overexpression of genes mediating inflammatory responses and under-expression of genes involved in mucosal repair and remodeling. EP_{4} thus appears to serve anti-inflammatory and protective functions in the colon and agonists of this receptor may be useful for treating inflammatory bowel diseases such as ulcerative colitis. Activation of EP_{4} stimulates duodenum epithelial cells to secrete bicarbonate (HCO3-) in mice and humans; this response neutralizes the acidic fluid flowing from the stomach thereby contributing to the process of intestinal ulcer healing. Activators of this receptor therefore may useful as anti-ulcer drugs.

=== Bone ===
Studies in mice found that the PGE_{2}-EP_{4} pathway induces osteoclast (i.e. cells responsible for bone absorption) to differentiate from precursor cells and is required for IL-1beta-, Tumor necrosis factor alpha-, and basic fibroblast growth factor-induced osteoclast formation; bone taken from EP_{4}(-/-) mice to re-absorb bone when induced to do so and the infusion of PGE_{2} into mice failed to stimulate bone absorption. Furthermore, the infusion of selective EP_{4} agonists into mice stimulated increases in the number of bone osteoclasts and osteoblasts as well as increases in bone density. These studies indicate that the EP_{4} receptor mediates bone remolding in mice and, it is suggested, other animals including humans.

=== Heart ===
In mice, EP_{4} receptor agonists reduce the acute rejection of transplanted hearts, prolong the survival of heart-transplanted animals, and reduce cardiac damage in a model of ischemic reperfusion injury but also stimulate cardiac hypertrophy accompanied by poor cardiac function. EP_{4} receptor-depleted mice exhibit more severe cardiac damage in experimental models of myocardial infarction and ischemic reperfusion injury but also develop cardiac hypertrophy with poor cardiac function. Cardiac specific EP_{4} deficiency using Site-specific recombination by the Cre recombinase method to inactivate EP_{4} only in cardiac muscle causes a somewhat different form of cardiac disease, dilated cardiomyopathy, that develops within 23–33 weeks after birth in mice. These studies are interpreted as indicating that EP_{4} plays both protective and damaging roles in the heart with the protective effects of EP_{4} due at least in part to its ability to suppress inflammation.

=== Lipid metabolism ===
EP_{4} receptor-depleted mice exhibit slower weight gain; reduced adiposity upon high fat diet challenge; and shortened life span. These deficiencies are associated with disrupted lipid metabolism due to impaired triglyceride clearance; this impaired triglyceride clearance may underlie the cited deficiencies.

=== Cancer ===
The EP_{4} receptor is over-expressed in human prostate cancer tissue and a selective EP_{4}-receptor antagonist inhibits the growth and metastasis of human prostate cancer cell xenografts. An EP_{4} receptor antagonist as well EP_{4} Gene knockdown inhibit the in vitro proliferation and invasiveness of human breast cancer cells. And, gene knockdown of EP_{4} inhibit the metastasis of murine breast cancer cells in a mouse model of induced breast cancer. PGE_{2} stimulates the in vitro growth of human non-small cell lung cancer while an antagonist of EP_{4} or EP_{4} gene knockdown inhibits this growth. These results indicate that the stimulation of EP_{4} promotes the growth of various types of cancer cells and therefore may play a role in the progression of certain types of human cancer.

=== Hearing ===
EP4_{4} receptors are expressed in the cochlea of the inner ear. Pre- and post-treatment of guinea pigs with an EP4 agonist significantly attenuated threshold shifts of auditory brain stem responses and significantly reduced the loss of outer hair cells caused by prior noise exposure. These findings indicate that EP4 is involved in mechanisms for prostaglandin E(1) actions on the cochlea, and local EP4 agonist treatment may be a means for attenuating noise-induced hearing lose.

=== Eye ===
A selective EP_{4} antagonists significantly reduced corneal neovascularization in rats caused by oxygen-induced retinopathy or laser-induced choroidal neovascularization. This result suggests that EP_{4} activation contributes to corneal neovascularization and that EP_{4} antagonists may be useful for treating neovascular eye disease.

== Clinical significance ==
=== Translational research ===
Clinical translational research studies using EP_{4} stimulators (i.e. agonists) or inhibitors (i.e. antagonists) that have been conducted or are underway include:

- The selective EP_{4} agonist, ^{name}_{rivenprost} (ONO-4819), improved the ulcerative colitis symptoms of 3 among 4 tested patients in a phase 2 clinical trial finished in 2009 (https://clinicaltrials.gov/ct2/show/record/NCT00296556?term=rivenprost&rank=10) but no follow-up studies have been recorded.
- The EP_{4} selective antagonist, CJ-023,423, was tested for its effectiveness in treating gastroduodenal ulcers in patients between 2006 and 2008 d with no results reported (https://clinicaltrials.gov/ct2/show/NCT00392080?term=CJ-023%2C423&rank=1) and is currently being tested in the recruitment step for a phase 2 clinical trial to treat prostate, non-small cell lung, and breast cancers (https://clinicaltrials.gov/ct2/show/NCT02538432?term=CJ-023%2C423&rank=2).
- The EP_{4} selective antagonist, BGC20-1531, is being tested for its ability to block PGE_{2}-induced headaches in health volunteers to determine if it is a potentially useful candidate for testing its effectiveness on clinical headaches (https://clinicaltrials.gov/ct2/show/NCT00957983?term=EP4&rank=1).
- Grapiprant, a highly selective and potent EP_{4} antagonist, is approved by the Food and Drug Administration for use in canine medicine to treat pain caused by inflammation such as that occurring in osteoarthritis; it is currently also under investigation for use in humans.

=== Genomic Studies ===
Single nucleotide polymorphism (SNP) A/G variant rs10440635 close to the PTGER4 gene on human chromosome 5 has been associated with an increased incidence of Ankylosing spondylitis in a population recruited from the United Kingdom, Australia, and Canada. Ankylosing spondylitis is a chronic inflammatory disease involving excessive bone deposition in the Vertebral column and increased expression of EP4 at vertebral column sites of involvement. Thus, excessive EP4 activation may contribute to the pathological bone remodeling and deposition found in ankylosing spondylitis and the rs10440635 variant may predispose to this disease by influencing EP4's production or expression pattern.

The GG genotype at -1254G>A in PTGER4 is associated with the non-steroidal anti-inflammatory drug (NSAID)-exacerbated cutaneous disease (NECD). NECD is a non-allergic hypersensitivity reaction involving the acute development of wheals and angioedema in response to NSAID consumption in individuals with a history of chronic urticarial. The G allele at the -1254 position leads to lower PTGER4 gene promoter function, lower levels of EP_{4}, and presumably thereby less of the anti-inflammatory effects of EP_{4}.

Several PTGER4 gene variations have been associated with inflammatory bowel disease: a) Meta-analysis of Genome-wide association studies found that SNP variant rs11742570 containing a C/T single-nucleotide variation in PTGER4 is associated with an increased incidence of Crohn's disease; b) rs4495224, an A/C SNP variant, and rs7720838, both of which are projected to be binding sites in PTERG4 for the transcription factor, NF-κB, have been associated with Crohn's disease in three independent cohorts with the association between rs7720838 and Crohn's disease being replicated in other populations; and c) certain alleles in 5p13.1, a Gene desert close to PTGER4, correlate with the expression levels of EP_{4} as well as with the development of Crohn's disease.

The A/T SNP variant, rs4434423, in the 5'-untranslated region of PTGER4 has been associated with and increase rate of primary graft dysfunction in a multicentered cohort study of graph recipients of different ethnicities.

== See also ==
- Prostaglandin E2 receptor 1 (EP1)
- Prostaglandin E2 receptor 2 (EP2)
- Prostaglandin E2 receptor 3 (EP3)
- Eicosanoid receptor
