= Prostaglandin EP1 receptor =

Protein-coding gene in the species Homo sapiens

PTGER1

Identifiers
- Aliases: PTGER1, EP1, EP1 receptor, prostaglandin E receptor 1
- External IDs: OMIM: 176802; MGI: 97793; GeneCards: PTGER1

Gene location (Human)
| Chr. | Chromosome 19 (human) |
| Band | 19p13.12 | Start | 14,472,466 bp |
| Band | 19p13.12 | End | 14,475,354 bp |

Gene location (Mouse)
| Chr. | Chromosome 8 (mouse) |
| Band | 8 C2|8 40.22 cM | Start | 84,393,307 bp |
| Band | 8 C2|8 40.22 cM | End | 84,399,382 bp |
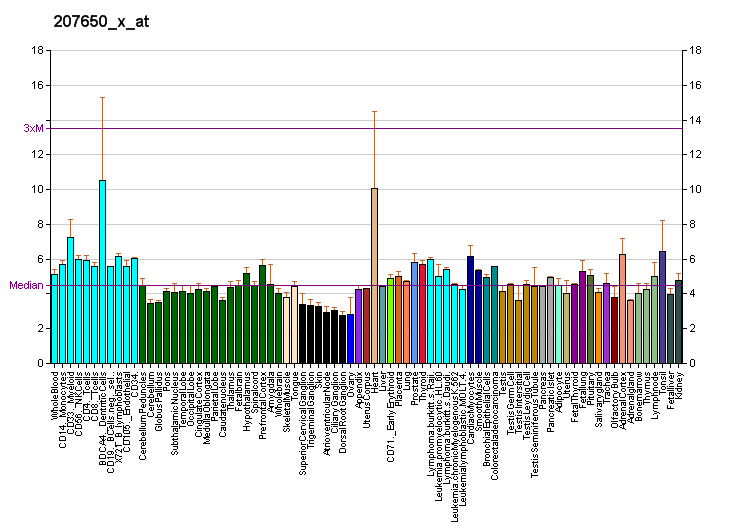

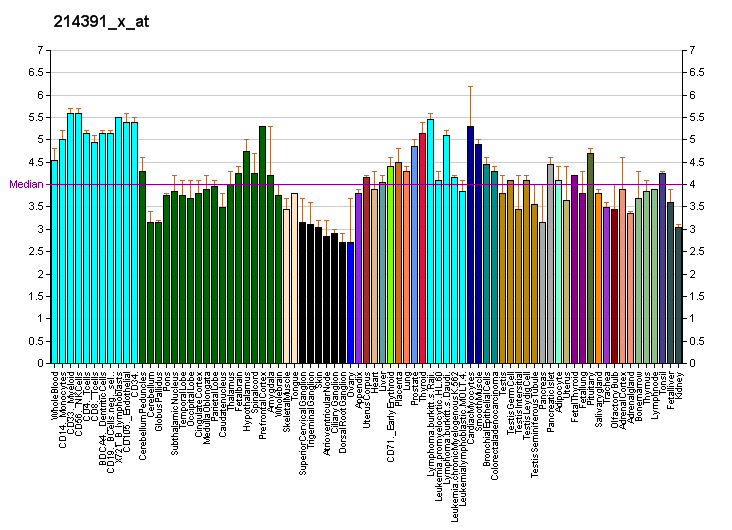
RNA expression pattern
| Bgee | Human / Mouse (ortholog); Top expressed in: kidney tubule; gastric mucosa; spleen; metanephric glomerulus; body of stomach; human kidney; left adrenal cortex; renal medulla; right adrenal cortex; stromal cell of endometrium / Top expressed in: lumbar spinal ganglion; granulocyte; neural layer of retina; right kidney; genital tubercle; morula; esophagus; superior frontal gyrus; tail of embryo; muscle of thigh; More reference expression data |
| BioGPS | More reference expression data |
Gene ontology
| Molecular function | prostaglandin receptor activity; G protein-coupled receptor activity; signal transducer activity; prostaglandin E receptor activity; D1 dopamine receptor binding |
| Cellular component | integral component of membrane; plasma membrane; integral component of plasma membrane; membrane; intracellular anatomical structure |
| Biological process | G protein-coupled receptor signaling pathway; response to lipopolysaccharide; signal transduction; adenylate cyclase-activating dopamine receptor signaling pathway; inflammatory response; adenylate cyclase-activating G protein-coupled receptor signaling pathway; positive regulation of cytosolic calcium ion concentration; negative regulation of gastric emptying |
Sources:Amigo / QuickGO
Orthologs
| Databases | NCBI: entry; OMA: entry |
| Species | Human | Mouse |
| Entrez | 5731 | 19216 |
| Ensembl | ENSG00000160951 | ENSMUSG00000019464 |
| UniProt | P34995 | P35375 |
| RefSeq (mRNA) | NM_000955 | NM_013641 |
| RefSeq (protein) | NP_000946 | NP_038669 |
| Location (UCSC) | Chr 19: 14.47 – 14.48 Mb | Chr 8: 84.39 – 84.4 Mb |
| PubMed search |
- Wikidata
| View/Edit Human | View/Edit Mouse |

Prostaglandin E_{2} receptor 1 (EP_{1}) is a 42kDa prostaglandin receptor encoded by the PTGER1 gene. EP_{1} is one of four identified EP receptors, EP_{1}, EP_{2}, EP_{3}, and EP_{4} which bind with and mediate cellular responses principally to prostaglandin E_{2} (PGE_{2}) and also but generally with lesser affinity and responsiveness to certain other prostanoids (see Prostaglandin receptors). Animal model studies have implicated EP_{1} in various physiological and pathological responses. However, key differences in the distribution of EP_{1} between these test animals and humans as well as other complicating issues make it difficult to establish the function(s) of this receptor in human health and disease.

== Gene ==
The PTGER_{1} gene is located on human chromosome 19 at position p13.12 (i.e. 19p13.12), contains 2 introns and 3 exons, and codes for a G protein-coupled receptor (GPCR) of the rhodopsin-like receptor family, Subfamily A14 (see rhodopsin-like receptors#Subfamily A14).

== Expression ==
Studies in mice, rats, and guinea pigs have found EP_{1} Messenger RNA and protein to be expressed in the papillary collecting ducts of the kidney, in the kidney, lung, stomach, thalamus, and in the dorsal root ganglia neurons as well as several central nervous system sites. However, the expression of EP_{1} In humans, its expression appears to be more limited: EP_{1} receptors have been detected in human mast cells, pulmonary veins, keratinocytes, myometrium, and colon smooth muscle.

== Ligands ==
=== Activating ligands ===
The following standard prostaglandins have the following relative potencies in binding to and activating EP_{1}: PGE_{2}≥PGE1>PGF2alpha>PGD2. The receptor binding affinity Dissociation constant K_{d} (i.e. ligand concentration needed to bind with 50% of available EP_{1} receptors) is ~20 nM and that of PGE1 ~40 for the mouse receptor and ~25 nM for PGE2 with the human receptor.

Because PGE_{2} activates multiple prostanoid receptors and has a short half-life in vivo due to its rapidly metabolism in cells by omega oxidation and beta oxidation], metabolically resistant EP_{1}-selective activators are useful for the study of EP_{1}'s function and could be clinically useful for the treatment of certain diseases. Only one such agonist that is highly selective in stimulating EP_{1} has been synthesized and identified, ONO-D1-OO4. This compound has a K_{i} inhibitory binding value (see Biochemistry#Receptor/ligand binding affinity) of 150 nM compared to that of 25 nM for PGE_{2} and is therefore ~5 times weaker than PGE_{2}.

=== Inhibiting ligands ===
SC51322 (K_{i}=13.8 nM), GW-848687 (K_{i}=8.6 nM), ONO-8711, SC-19220, SC-51089, and several other synthetic compounds given in next cited reference are selective competitive antagonists for EP_{1} that have been used for studies in animal models of human diseases. Carbacylin, 17-phenyltrinor PGE_{1}, and several other tested compounds are dual EP_{1}/EP_{3} antagonists (most marketed prostanoid receptor antagonists exhibit poor receptor selectivity).

== Mechanism of cell activation ==
When initially bound to PGE_{2} or other stimulating ligand, EP_{1} mobilizes G proteins containing the Gq alpha subunit (Gαq/11)-G beta-gamma complex. These two subunits in turn stimulate the Phosphoinositide 3-kinase pathway that raises cellular cytosolic Ca^{2+} levels thereby regulating Ca^{2+}-sensitive cell signal pathways which include, among several others, those that promote the activation of certain protein kinase C isoforms. Since, this rise in cytosolic Ca^{2+} can also contract muscle cells, EP_{1} has been classified as a contractile type of prostanoid receptor. The activation of protein kinases C feeds back to phosphorylate and thereby desensitizes the activated EP_{1} receptor (see homologous desensitization but may also desensitize other types of prostanoid and non-prostanoid receptors (see heterologous desensitization). These desensitizations limit further EP_{1} receptor activation within the cell. Concurrently with the mobilization of these pathways, ligand-activated EP_{1} stimulates ERK, p38 mitogen-activated protein kinases, and CREB pathways that lead to cellular functional responses.

== Function ==
Studies using animals genetically engineered to lack EP_{1} and supplemented by studies using treatment with EP_{1} receptor antagonists and agonists indicate that this receptor serves several functions. 1) It mediates hyperalgesia due to EP1_{1} receptors located in the central nervous system but suppresses pain perception due to E_{1} located on dorsal root ganglia neurons in rats. Thus, PGE_{2} causes increased pain perception when administered into the central nervous system but inhibits pain perception when administered systemically; 2) It promotes colon cancer development in Azoxymethane-induced and APC gene knockout mice. 3) It promotes hypertension in diabetic mice and spontaneously hypertensive rats. 4) It suppresses stress-induced impulsive behavior and social dysfunction in mice by suppressing the activation of Dopamine receptor D1 and Dopamine receptor D2 signaling. 5) It enhances the differentiation of uncommitted T cell lymphocytes to the Th1 cell phenotype and may thereby favor the development of inflammatory rather than allergic responses to immune stimulation in rodents. Studies with human cells indicate that EP_{1} serves a similar function on T cells. 6) It may reduce expression of Sodium-glucose transport proteins in the apical membrane or cells of the intestinal mucosa in rodents. 7) It may be differentially involved in etiology of acute brain injuries. Pharmacological inhibition or genetic deletion of EP_{1} receptor produce either beneficial or deleterious effects in rodent models of neurological disorders such as ischemic stroke, epileptic seizure, surgically induced brain injury and traumatic brain injury.

== Clinical studies ==
EP1 receptor antagonists have been studied clinically primarily to treat hyperalgesia. Numerous EP antagonists have been developed including SC51332, GW-848687X, a benzofuran-containing drug that have had some efficacy in treating various hyperalgesic syndromes in animal models. None have as yet been reported to be useful in humans.

== See also ==
- Prostaglandin receptors
- Prostanoid receptors
- Prostaglandin E2 receptor 2 (EP2)
- Prostaglandin E2 receptor 3 (EP3)
- Prostaglandin E2 receptor 4 (EP4)
- Eicosanoid receptor
