= Prostanoid =

Class of biomolecules regulating inflammatory response

In molecular biology, prostanoids are active lipid mediators that regulate inflammatory response. Prostanoids are a subclass of eicosanoids consisting of the prostaglandins (mediators of inflammatory and anaphylactic reactions), the thromboxanes (mediators of vasoconstriction), and the prostacyclins (active in the resolution phase of inflammation). Prostanoids are seen to target NSAIDS which allow for therapeutic potential. Prostanoids are present within areas of the body such as the gastrointestinal tract, urinary tract, respiratory and cardiovascular systems, reproductive tract and vascular system. Prostanoids can even be seen with aid to the water and ion transportation within cells.

== History ==
Prostanoids were discovered through biological research studies conducted in the 1930s. The first discovery was seen through semen by a Swedish Physiologist Ulf von Euler, who assumed they originated from the prostate. After intensive study throughout the 1960-1970s Sune K. Bergström and Bengt Ingemar Samuelsson and British biochemist Sir John Robert Vane were able to understand the function and chemical formation of Prostanoids: receiving a Nobel Prize for their analysis of prostanoids.

== Biosynthesis of prostaglandins ==

Cyclooxygenase (COX) catalyzes the conversion of the free essential fatty acids to prostanoids by a two-step process. In the first step, two molecules of O_{2} are added as two peroxide linkages and a 5-member carbon ring is forged near the middle of the fatty acid chain. This forms the short-lived, unstable intermediate Prostaglandin G (PGG). One of the peroxide linkages sheds a single oxygen, forming PGH. (See diagrams and more detail at Cyclooxygenase). All other prostanoids originate from PGH (as PGH_{1}, PGH_{2}, or PGH_{3}).

The image at right shows how PGH_{2} (derived from Arachidonic acid) is converted:

- By PGE synthetase into PGE2 (which in turn is converted into PGF2)
- By Prostaglandin-D synthase into PGD2
- By Prostacyclin synthase into prostacyclin (PGI2)
- By Thromboxane synthase into thromboxanes TXA

Arachidonic acid is made up of a 20-Carbon unnatural poly unsaturated Omega-fatty acid. Arachidonic acid presents within the phospholipid bi-layer as well as in the plasma membrane of a cell. With Arachidonic acid prostaglandins are formed through synthesis and oxygenation of enzymes. Active lipids in the oxylipin family derive from the synthesis of Cyclooxygenase or Prostaglandins.

The three classes of prostanoids have distinctive rings in the center of the molecule. They differ in their structures and do not share common structure as Thromboxane. The PGH compounds (parents to all the rest) have a 5-carbon ring, bridged by two oxygens (a peroxide.) The derived prostaglandins contain a single, unsaturated 5-carbon ring. In prostacyclins, this ring is conjoined to another oxygen-containing ring. In thromboxanes the ring becomes a 6-member ring with one oxygen.

Production of PGE_{2} in bacterial and viral infections appear to be stimulated by certain cytokines, e.g., interleukin-1.

== See also ==
- Prostaglandin
- Prostaglandin receptors
- Prostanoid receptors
- Essential fatty acid
- Isoprostane
- Prostacyclin
