= Eicosanoid =

Class of compounds

Pathways in biosynthesis of eicosanoids from arachidonic acid: there are parallel paths from EPA & DGLA.

Eicosanoids are signaling molecules made by the enzymatic or non-enzymatic oxidation of arachidonic acid or other polyunsaturated fatty acids (PUFAs) that are, similar to arachidonic acid, around 20 carbon units in length. Eicosanoids are a sub-category of oxylipins, i.e. oxidized fatty acids of diverse carbon units in length, and are distinguished from other oxylipins by their overwhelming importance as cell signaling molecules. Eicosanoids function in diverse physiological systems and pathological processes such as: mounting or inhibiting inflammation, allergy, fever and other immune responses; regulating the abortion of pregnancy and normal childbirth; contributing to the perception of pain; regulating cell growth; controlling blood pressure; and modulating the regional flow of blood to tissues. In performing these roles, eicosanoids most often act as autocrine signaling agents to impact their cells of origin or as paracrine signaling agents to impact cells in the proximity of their cells of origin. Some eicosanoids, such as prostaglandins, may also have endocrine roles as hormones to influence the function of distant cells.

There are multiple subfamilies of eicosanoids, including most prominently the prostaglandins, thromboxanes, leukotrienes, lipoxins, resolvins, and eoxins. For each subfamily, there is the potential to have at least 4 separate series of metabolites, two series derived from the ω−6 PUFAs arachidonic and dihomo-gamma-linolenic acids, one series derived from the ω−3 PUFA eicosapentaenoic acid, and one series derived from the ω−9 PUFA mead acid. This subfamily distinction is important. Mammals, including humans, are unable to convert ω−6 into ω−3 PUFA. In consequence, tissue levels of the ω−6 and ω−3 PUFAs and their corresponding eicosanoid metabolites link directly to the amount of dietary ω−6 versus ω−3 PUFAs consumed. Since certain of the ω−6 and ω−3 PUFA series of metabolites have almost diametrically opposing physiological and pathological activities, it has often been suggested that the deleterious consequences associated with the consumption of ω−6 PUFA-rich diets reflects excessive production and activities of ω−6 PUFA-derived eicosanoids, while the beneficial effects associated with the consumption of ω−3 PUFA-rich diets reflect the excessive production and activities of ω−3 PUFA-derived eicosanoids. In this view, the opposing effects of ω−6 PUFA-derived and ω−3 PUFA-derived eicosanoids on key target cells underlie the detrimental and beneficial effects of ω−6 and ω−3 PUFA-rich diets on inflammation and allergy reactions, atherosclerosis, hypertension, cancer growth, and a host of other processes.

== Nomenclature ==
=== Fatty acid sources ===
"Eicosanoid" (from Greek eicosa- 'twenty') is the collective term for straight-chain PUFAs (polyunsaturated fatty acids) of 20 carbon units in length that have been metabolized or otherwise converted to oxygen-containing products. The PUFA precursors to the eicosanoids include:

- Arachidonic acid (AA), i.e. 5Z,8Z,11Z,14Z-eicosatetraenoic acid is an ω−6 fatty acid with four double bonds in the cis configuration (denoted Z in E–Z notation), each located between carbons 5-6, 8-9, 11-12, and 14-15 (see carbon numbering).
- Adrenic acid (AdA), i.e. 7Z,10Z,13Z,16Z-docosatetraenoic acid, is an ω−6 fatty acid with four cis double bonds, each located between carbons 7-8, 10-11, 13-14, and 16-17.
- Eicosapentaenoic acid (EPA), i.e. 5Z,8Z,11Z,14Z,17Z-eicosapentaenoic acid is an ω−3 fatty acid with five cis double bonds, each located between carbons 5-6, 8-9, 11-12, 14-15, and 17-18.
- Dihomo-gamma-linolenic acid (DGLA), i.e. 8Z,11Z,14Z-eicosatrienoic acid is an ω−6 fatty acid with three cis double bonds, each located between carbons 8-9, 11-12, and 14-15.
- Mead acid, i.e. 5Z,8Z,11Z-eicosatrienoic acid, is an ω−9 fatty acid containing three cis double bonds, each located between carbons 5-6, 8-9, and 11-12.

=== Abbreviation ===
A particular eicosanoid is denoted by a four-character abbreviation, composed of:

- its two-letter abbreviation (LT, EX or PG, as described below),
- one A-B-C sequence-letter,
- A subscript or plain script number following the designated eicosanoid's trivial name indicates the number of its double bonds. Examples are:
  - The EPA-derived prostanoids have three double bonds (e.g. PGG_{3} or PGG3) while leukotrienes derived from EPA have five double bonds (e.g. LTB_{5} or LTB5).
  - The AA-derived prostanoids have two double bonds (e.g. PGG_{2} or PGG2) while their AA-derived leukotrienes have four double bonds (e.g. LTB_{4} or LTB4).
- Hydroperoxy-, hydroxyl-, and oxo-eicosanoids possess a hydroperoxy (-OOH), hydroxy (-OH), or oxygen atom (=O) substituents link to a PUFA carbon by a single (-) or double (=) bond. Their trivial names indicate the substituent as: Hp or HP for a hydroperoxy residue (e.g. 5-hydroperooxy-eicosatraenoic acid or 5-HpETE or 5-HPETE); H for a hydroxy residue (e.g. 5-hydroxy-eicosatetraenoic acid or 5-HETE); and oxo- for an oxo residue (e.g. 5-oxo-eicosatetraenioic acid or 5-oxo-ETE or 5-oxoETE). The number of their double bonds is indicated by their full and trivial names: AA-derived hydroxy metabolites have four (i.e. 'tetra' or 'T') double bonds (e.g. 5-hydroxy-eicosatetraenoic acid or 5-HETE; EPA-derived hydroxy metabolites have five ('penta' or 'P') double bonds (e.g. 5-hydroxy-eicosapentaenoic acid or 5-HEPE); and DGLA-derived hydroxy metabolites have three ('tri' or 'Tr') double bonds (e.g. 5-hydroxy-eicosatrienoic acid or 5-HETrE).

The stereochemistry of the eicosanoid products formed may differ among the pathways. For prostaglandins, this is often indicated by Greek letters (e.g. PGF_{2α} versus PGF_{2β}). For hydroperoxy and hydroxy eicosanoids an S or R designates the chirality of their substituents (e.g. 5S-hydroxy-eicosateteraenoic acid [also termed 5(S)-, 5S-hydroxy-, and 5(S)-hydroxy-eicosatetraenoic acid] is given the trivial names of 5S-HETE, 5(S)-HETE, 5S-HETE, or 5(S)-HETE). Since eicosanoid-forming enzymes commonly make S isomer products either with marked preference or essentially exclusively, the use of S/R designations has often been dropped (e.g. 5S-HETE is 5-HETE). Nonetheless, certain eicosanoid-forming pathways do form R isomers and their S versus R isomeric products can exhibit dramatically different biological activities. Failing to specify S/R isomers can be misleading. Here, all hydroperoxy and hydroxy substituents have the S configuration unless noted otherwise.

=== Classic eicosanoids ===
Current usage limits the term eicosanoid to:

- ω−6 series eicosanoids derived from arachidonic acid:
  - Hydroxyeicosatetraenoic acids (HETE) include the following metabolites of arachidonic acid:
    - 5-HETE, 12-HETE, 15-hydroxyeicosatetraenoic acid (i.e. 15-HETE), 20-hydroxyeicosatetraenoic acid (i.e. 20-HETE), and 19-HETE.
  - Leukotrienes (LT) include the following metabolites of arachidonic acid:
    - LTA_{4}, LTB4_{4}, LTC_{4}, LTD_{4}, and LTE_{4}.
  - Eoxins (EX) include the following metabolites of arachidonic acid:
    - EXA_{4}, EXC_{4}, EXD_{4}, and EXE_{4}.
  - Prostanoids consisting of several different types:
    - Prostaglandins (PG) include the following metabolites of arachidonic acid:
      - PGG_{2}, PGH_{2}, PGE_{2}, PGD_{2}, PGF_{2α}, PGA_{2}, PGB_{2} (see Specialized pro-resolving mediators § Prostaglandins and isoprostanes).
    - Prostacyclins include:
      - PGI_{2}.
    - Thromboxanes (TX) include the following metabolites of arachidonic acid:
      - TXA_{2} and TXB_{2}.
    - Cyclopentenone prostaglandins include the following metabolites of arachidonic acid:
      - PGA_{1}, PGA_{2} (see Prostanoid, PGJ_{2}, Δ12-PGJ_{2}, and 15-deoxy-Δ12,14-PGJ_{2}).
- ω−6 series eicosanoids derived from dihomo-gamma-linolenic acid. These metabolites are analogs of arachidonic acid-derived eicosanoids but lack a double bond between carbons 5 and 6 and therefore have 1 less double bond than their arachidonic acid-derived analogs. They are the following:
  - PGA_{1}, PGE_{1}, and TXA_{1}.
- ω−3 series eicosanoids:
  - Resolvins of the E series (RvE) (D series resolvins [RvD] are metabolites of the 22-carbon ω−3 fatty acid docosahexaenoic acid; see Specialized pro-resolving mediators § DHA-derived resolvins). RvE include the following metabolites of eicosapentaenoic acid:
    - RvE1, 18S-RvE1, RvE2, and RvE3.
  - Other ω−3 series eicosapentaenoic acid-derived eicosanoids are analogs of ω−6 fatty acid-derived metabolites but contain a double bond between carbon 17 and 18 and therefore have one more double bond than their arachidonic acid-derived analogs. They include (HEPE is hydroxyeicosapentaenoic acid):
    - 5-HEPE, 12-HEPE, 15-HEPE, and 20-HETE; LTA5, LTB5, LTC5, LTD5, and LTE5 (see Arachidonate 5-lipoxygenase § Eicosapentaenoic acid); PGE_{3}, PGD_{3}, PGF_{3α}, and Δ(17)-6-keto PGF_{1α}; PGI_{3} (see Essential fatty acid interactions § Counteraction); and TXA_{3} and TXB_{3}.
- ω−9 series eicosanoids
  - Hydroxy are derived form mead acid, is metabolized to the 3 double bond-containing analog of 5-HETE viz., 5-HETrE (see Arachidonate 5-lipoxygenase § Mead acid).

Hydroxyeicosatetraenoic acids, leukotrienes, eoxins and prostanoids are sometimes termed "classic eicosanoids".

=== Nonclassic eicosanoids ===
In contrast to the classic eicosanoids, several other classes of PUFA metabolites have been termed 'novel', 'eicosanoid-like' or 'nonclassic eicosanoids'. These included the following classes:

- Oxoeicosanoids (oxo-ETE) include the following metabolites:
  - 5-Oxo-eicosatetraenoic acid (5-oxo-ETE), 12-oxo-ETE (see 12-HETE § Further metabolism), and 15-oxo-ETE, which are metabolites of arachidonic acid (see 15-Hydroxyeicosatetraenoic acid) and 5-oxo-ETrE which is a metabolite of mead acid (see Arachidonate 5-lipoxygenase § Mead acid).
- Hepoxilins (Hx) include the following arachidonic acid metabolites:
  - HxA_{3} and HxB_{3}.
- Lipoxins (Lx) include the following metabolites of arachidonic acid:
  - LxA_{4} and LxB_{4} (see Specialized pro-resolving mediators).
- Epi-lipoxins (epi-Lx) include the following metabolites of arachidonic acid:
  - 15-epi-LxA_{4} (also termed AT-LxA_{4}) and 15-epi-LxB_{4} (also termed AT-LxB_{4}).
- Epoxyeicosatrienoic acids (EET) include the following metabolites of arachidonic acid:
  - 5,6-EET, 8,9-EET, 11,12-EET, and 14,15-EET.
- Epoxyeicosatetraenoic acids (EEQ) include the following metabolites of eicosapentaenoic acid:
  - 5,6-EEQ, 8,9-EEQ, 11,12-EEQ, 14,15-EEQ, and 15,16-EEQ.
- Isoprostanes (isoP) are non-enzymatically formed derivatives of polyunsaturated fatty acids studied as markers of oxidative stress; they include the following arachidonic acid-derived isoPs which are named based on their structural similarities to PGs:
  - D_{2}-isoPs, E_{2}-isoPs, A_{2}-isoPs, and J_{2}-isoPs; and two epoxide-containing isoPs, 5,6-epoxyisoprostane E_{2} and 5,6-epoxyisoprostane A_{2}. Some of these isoPs have been shown to possess anti-inflammatory activity (see Specialized pro-resolving mediators § Prostaglandins and isoprostanes).
- Isofurans are non-enzymatically formed derivatives of polyunsaturated fatty acids that possess a furan ring structure; they are studied as markers of oxidative stress. There are 256 potentially different furan ring-containing isomers that can be derived from arachidonic acid.
- Endocannabinoids are certain glycerolipids or dopamine that are esterified to polyunsaturated fatty acids that activate cannabinoid receptors. They include the following arachidonic acid-esterified agents:
  - Arachidonoylethanolamine, 2-arachidonoylglycerol, 2-arachidonyl glyceryl ether, O-arachidonoyl-ethanolamine, and N-arachidonoyl dopamine.

Metabolism of eicosapentaenoic acid to HEPEs, leukotrienes, prostanoids, and epoxyeicosatetraenoic acids as well as the metabolism of dihomo-gamma-linolenic acid to prostanoids and mead acid to 5(S)-hydroxy-6E,8Z,11Z-eicosatrienoic acid (5-HETrE), 5-oxo-6,8,11-eicosatrienoic acid (5-oxo-ETrE), LTA_{3}, and LTC_{3} involve the same enzymatic pathways that make their arachidonic acid-derived analogs.

== Biosynthesis ==
Eicosanoids typically are not stored within cells but rather synthesized as required. They derive from the fatty acids that make up the cell membrane and nuclear membrane. These fatty acids must be released from their membrane sites and then metabolized initially to products which most often are further metabolized through various pathways to make the large array of products we recognize as bioactive eicosanoids.

=== Fatty acid mobilization ===
Eicosanoid biosynthesis begins when a cell is activated by mechanical trauma, ischemia, other physical perturbations, attack by pathogens, or stimuli made by nearby cells, tissues, or pathogens such as chemotactic factors, cytokines, growth factors, and even certain eicosanoids. The activated cells then mobilize enzymes, termed phospholipases A_{2} (PLA_{2}), capable of releasing ω−6 and ω−3 fatty acids from membrane storage. These fatty acids are bound in ester linkage to the SN2 position of membrane phospholipids; PLA_{2} act as esterases to release the fatty acid. There are several classes of PLA_{2} with type IV cytosolic PLA_{2} (cPLA_{2}) appearing to be responsible for releasing the fatty acids under many conditions of cell activation. The cPLA_{2} act specifically on phospholipids that contain AA, EPA or GPLA at their SN2 position. cPLA_{2} may also release the lysophospholipid that becomes platelet-activating factor.

=== Peroxidation and reactive oxygen species ===
Next, the free fatty acid is oxygenated along any of several pathways; see the Pathways table. The eicosanoid pathways (via lipoxygenase or COX) add molecular oxygen (O_{2}). Although the fatty acid is symmetric, the resulting eicosanoids are chiral; the oxidations proceed with high stereoselectivity (enzymatic oxidations are considered practically stereospecific).

Four families of enzymes initiate or contribute to the initiation of the catalysis of fatty acids to eicosanoids:

- Cyclooxygenases (COXs): COX-1 and COX-2 initiate the metabolism of arachidonic acid to prostanoids that contain two double bonds, i.e. the prostaglandins (e.g. PGE_{2}), prostacyclins (i.e. PGI_{2}), and thromboxanes (e.g. TXA_{2}). The two COX enzymes likewise initiate the metabolism of: a) Eicosapentaenoic acid, which has 5 double bonds compared to the 4 double bonds of arachidonic acid, to prostanoid, prostacyclin, and thromboxane products that have three double bonds, e.g. PGE_{3}, PGI_{3}, and TXA_{3} and b) Dihomo-γ-linolenic acid, which has three double bonds, to prostanoid, prostacyclin, and thromboxane products that have only one double bond, e.g. PGE_{1}, PGI_{1}, and TXA_{1}.
- Lipoxygenases (LOXs): 5-Lipoxygenase (5-LOX or ALOX5) initiates the metabolism of arachidonic acid to 5-hydroperoxyeicosatetraenoic acid (5-HpETE) which then may be rapidly reduced to 5-hydroxyeicosatetraenoic acid (5-HETE) or further metabolized to the leukotrienes (e.g. LTB_{4} and LTC_{4}); 5-HETE may be oxidized to 5-oxo-eicosatetraenoic acid (5-oxo-ETE). In similar fashions, 15-lipoxygenase (15-lipoxygenase 1, 15-LOX, 15-LOX1, or ALOX15) initiates the metabolism of arachidonic acid to 15-HpETE, 15-HETE, eoxins, 8,15-dihydroxyeicosatetraenoic acid (i.e. 8,15-DiHETE), and 15-oxo-ETE and 12-lipoxygenase (12-LOX or ALOX12) initiates the metabolism of arachidonic acid to 12-HpETE, 12-HETE, hepoxilins, and 12-oxo-ETE. These enzymes also initiate the metabolism of; a) Eicosapentaenoic acid to analogs of the arachidonic acid metabolites that contain 5 rather than four double bonds, e.g. 5-hydroxyeicosapentaenoic acid (5-HEPE), LTB_{5}, LTC_{5}, 5-oxo-EPE, 15-HEPE, and 12-HEPE; b) The three double bond-containing dihomo-γ-linolenic acid to products that contain 3 double bonds, e.g. 8-hydroxy-eicosatrienoic acid (8-HETrE), 12-HETrE, and 15-HETrE (this fatty acid cannot be converted to leukotrienes); and the three double bond-containing mead acid (by ALOX5) to 5-hydroperoxy-eicosatrienoic acid (5-HpETrE), 5-HETrE, and 5-oxo-HETrE. In the most studied of these pathways, ALOX5 metabolizes eicosapentaenoic acid to 5-hydroperoxyeicosapentaenoic acid (5-HpEPE), 5-HEPE, and LTB_{5}, and 5-oxo-EPE, all of which are less active than there arachidonic acid analogs. Since eicosapentaenoic acid competes with arachidonic acid for ALOX5, production of the eicosapentaenoate metabolites leads to a reduction in the eicosatetraenoate metabolites and therefore reduction in the latter metabolites' signaling. The initial mono-hydroperoxy and mono-hydroxy products made by the aforementioned lipoxygenases have their hydroperosy and hydroxyl residues positioned in the S chiral configuration and are more properly termed 5S-HpETE, 5S-HETE, 12S-HpETE, 12S-HETE, 15S-HpETE and, 15S-HETE. ALOX12B (i.e. arachidonate 12-lipoxygenase, 12R type) forms R chirality products, i.e. 12R-HpETE and 12R-HETE. Similarly, ALOXE3 (i.e. epidermis-type lipoxygenase 3 or eLOX3) metabolizes arachidonic acid to 12R-HpETE and 12R-HETE; however these are minor products that this enzyme forms only under a limited set of conditions. ALOXE3 preferentially metabolizes arachidonic acid to hepoxilins.
- Epoxygenases: these are cytochrome P450 enzymes which generate nonclassic eicosanoid epoxides derived from: a) Arachidonic acid viz., 5,6-epoxy-eicosatrienoic acid (5,6-EET), 8,9-EET, 11,12-EET, and 14,15-EET (see Epoxyeicosatrienoic acid); b) Eicosapentaenoic acid viz., 5,6,-epoxy-eicosatetraenoic acid (5,6-EEQ), 8,9-EEQ, 11,12-EEQ, 14,15-EEQ, and 17,18-EEQ (see Epoxyeicosatetraenoic acid); c) Dihomo-γ-linolenic acid viz., 8,9-epoxy-eicosadienoic acid (8,9-EpEDE), 11,12-EpEDE, and 14,15-EpEDE; and d) Adrenic acid viz., 7,8-epox-eicosatrienoic acid (7,8-EpETrR), 10,11-EpTrE, 13,14-EpTrE, and 16,17-EpETrE. All of these epoxides are converted, sometimes rapidly, to their dihydroxy metabolites, by various cells and tissues. For example, 5,6-EET is converted to 5,6-dihydroxy-eicosatrienoic acid (5,6-DiHETrE), 8,9-EEQ to 8,9-dihydroxy-eicosatetraenoic acid (8,9-DiHETE, 11,12-EpEDE to 11,12-dihydroxy-eicosadienoic acid (11,12DiHEDE), and 16,17-EpETrE to 16,17-dihydroxy-eicosatrienoic acid (16,17-DiETrE.
- Cytochrome P450 microsome ω hydroxylases: CYP4A11, CYP4A22, CYP4F2, and CYP4F3 metabolize arachidonic acid primarily to 20-hydroxyeicosatetraenoic acid (20-HETE) but also to 16-HETE, 17-HETE, 18-HETE, and 19-HETE; they also metabolize eicosapentaenoic acid primarily to 20-hydroxy-eicosapentaenoic acid (20-HEPE) but also to 19-HEPE.

Two different enzymes may act in series on a PUFA to form more complex metabolites. For example, ALOX5 acts with ALOX12 or aspirin-treated COX-2 to metabolize arachidonic acid to lipoxins and with cytochrome P450 monooxygenase(s), bacterial cytochrome P450 (in infected tissues), or aspirin-treated COX2 to metabolize eicosapentaenoic acid to the E series resolvins (RvEs) (see Specialized pro-resolving mediators). When this occurs with enzymes located in different cell types and involves the transfer of one enzyme's product to a cell which uses the second enzyme to make the final product it is referred to as transcellular metabolism or transcellular biosynthesis.

The oxidation of lipids is hazardous to cells, particularly when close to the nucleus. There are elaborate mechanisms to prevent unwanted oxidation. COX, the lipoxygenases, and the phospholipases are tightly controlled—there are at least eight proteins activated to coordinate generation of leukotrienes. Several of these exist in multiple isoforms.

Oxidation by either COX or lipoxygenase releases reactive oxygen species (ROS) and the initial products in eicosanoid generation are themselves highly reactive peroxides. LTA_{4} can form adducts with tissue DNA. Other reactions of lipoxygenases generate cellular damage; murine models implicate 15-lipoxygenase in the pathogenesis of atherosclerosis. The oxidation in eicosanoid generation is compartmentalized; this limits the peroxides' damage. The enzymes that are biosynthetic for eicosanoids (e.g., glutathione-S-transferases, epoxide hydrolases, and carrier proteins) belong to families whose functions are involved largely with cellular detoxification. This suggests that eicosanoid signaling might have evolved from the detoxification of ROS.

The cell must realize some benefit from generating lipid hydroperoxides close-by its nucleus. PGs and LTs may signal or regulate DNA transcription there; LTB_{4} is ligand for PPARα. (See diagram at PPAR.)

Structures of selected eicosanoids
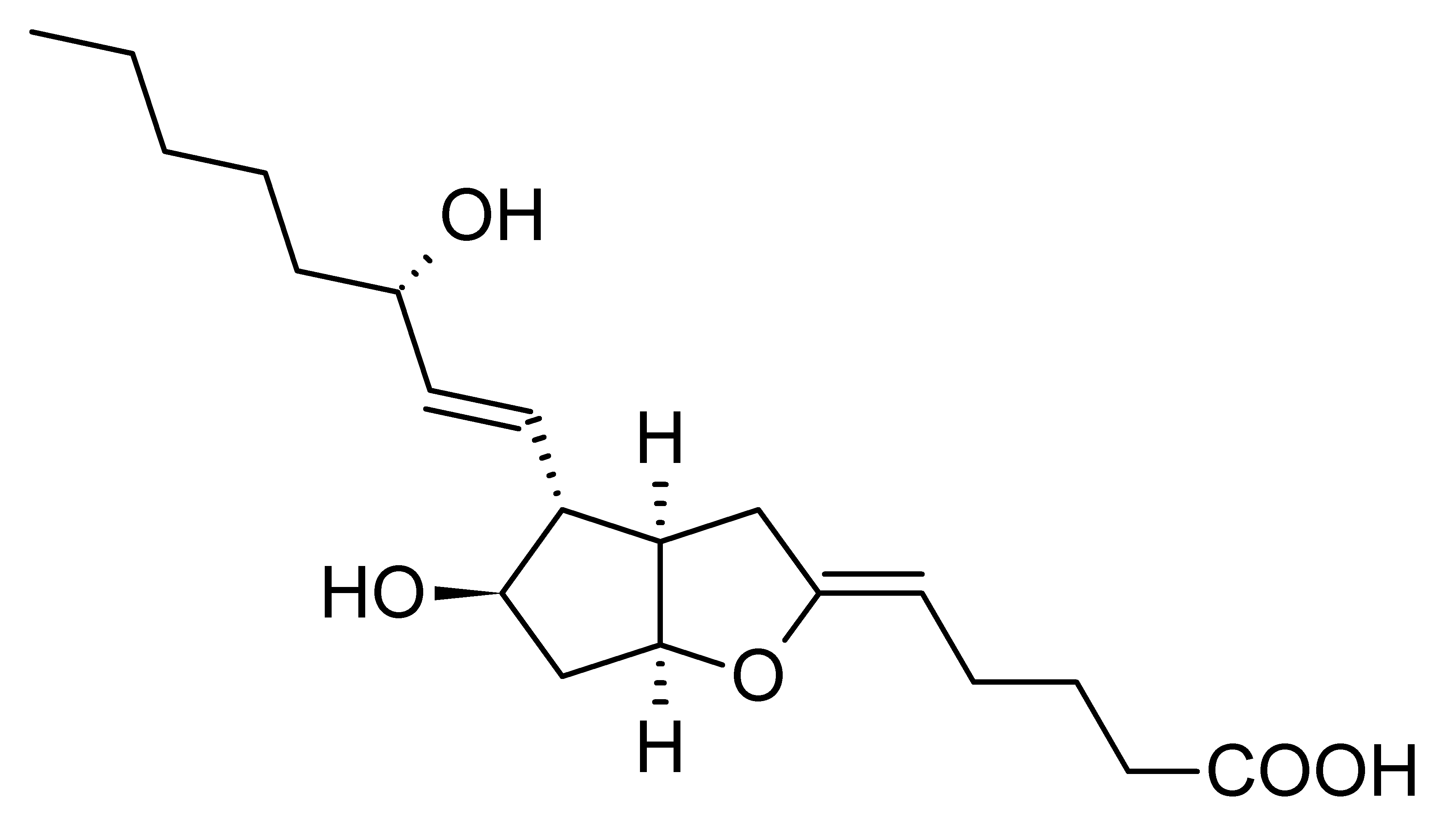
Prostaglandin E_{1}. The 5-member ring is characteristic of the class.	Thromboxane A_{2}. Oxygens have moved into the ring.	Leukotriene B_{4}. Note the 3 conjugated double bonds.
Prostacyclin I_{2}. The second ring distinguishes it from the prostaglandins.		Leukotriene E_{4}, an example of a cysteinyl leukotriene.

=== Prostanoid pathways ===
Both COX1 and COX2 (also termed prostaglandin-endoperoxide synthase-1 (PTGS1) and PTGS2, respectively) metabolize arachidonic acid by adding molecular O_{2} between carbons 9 and 11 to form an endoperoxide bridge between these two carbons, adding molecular O_{2} to carbon 15 to yield a 15-hydroperoxy product, creating a carbon-carbon bond between carbons 8 and 12 to create a cyclopentane ring in the middle of the fatty acid, and in the process making PGG_{2}, a product that has two fewer double bonds than arachidonic acid. The 15-hydroperoxy residue of PGG_{2} is then reduced to a 15-hydroxyl residue thereby forming PGH_{2}. PGH_{2} is the parent prostanoid to all other prostanoids. It is metabolized by (see diagram in Prostanoid): a) The prostaglandin E synthase pathway in which any one of three isozymes, PTGES, PTGES2, or PTGES3, convert PGH_{2} to PGE_{2} (subsequent products of this pathway include PGA_{2} and PGB_{2} (see Prostanoid § Biosynthesis of prostaglandins); b) PGF synthase which converts PGH_{2} to PGF_{2α}; c) Prostaglandin D_{2} synthase which converts PGH_{2} to PGD_{2} (subsequent products in this pathway include 15-dPGJ_{2} (see Cyclopentenone prostaglandin); d) Thromboxane synthase which converts PGH_{2} to TXA_{2} (subsequent products in this pathway include TXB_{2}); and e) Prostacyclin synthase which converts PGH_{2} to PGI_{2} (subsequent products in this pathway include 6-keto-PGFα. These pathways have been shown or in some cases presumed to metabolize eicosapentaenoic acid to eicosanoid analogs of the sited products that have three rather than two double bonds and therefore contain the number 3 in place of 2 attached to their names (e.g. PGE_{3} instead of PGE_{2}).

The PGE_{2}, PGE_{1}, and PGD_{2} products formed in the pathways just cited can undergo a spontaneous dehydration reaction to form PGA_{2}, PGA_{1}, and PGJ_{2}, respectively; PGJ_{2} may then undergo a spontaneous isomerization followed by a dehydration reaction to form in series Δ12-PGJ_{2} and 15-deoxy-Δ12,14-PGJ_{2}.

PGH_{2} has a 5-carbon ring bridged by molecular oxygen. Its derived PGS have lost this oxygen bridge and contain a single, unsaturated 5-carbon ring with the exception of thromboxane A_{2} which possesses a 6-member ring consisting of one oxygen and 5 carbon atoms. The 5-carbon ring of prostacyclin is conjoined to a second ring consisting of 4 carbon and one oxygen atom. And, the 5 member ring of the cyclopentenone prostaglandins possesses an unsaturated bond in a conjugated system with a carbonyl group that causes these PGs to form bonds with a diverse range of bioactive proteins (for more see the diagrams at Prostanoid).

=== Hydroxyeicosatetraenoate (HETE) and leukotriene (LT) pathways ===
The enzyme 5-lipoxygenase (5-LO or ALOX5) converts arachidonic acid into 5-hydroperoxyeicosatetraenoic acid (5-HPETE), which may be released and rapidly reduced to 5-hydroxyeicosatetraenoic acid (5-HETE) by ubiquitous cellular glutathione-dependent peroxidases. Alternately, ALOX5 uses its LTA synthase activity to act convert 5-HPETE to leukotriene A_{4} (LTA_{4}). LTA_{4} is then metabolized either to LTB_{4} by leukotriene A_{4} hydrolase or leukotriene C_{4} (LTC_{4}) by either LTC_{4} synthase or microsomal glutathione S-transferase 2 (MGST2). Either of the latter two enzymes act to attach the sulfur of cysteine's thio- (i.e. SH) group in the tripeptide glutamate-cysteine-glycine to carbon 6 of LTA_{4} thereby forming LTC_{4}. After release from its parent cell, the glutamate and glycine residues of LTC_{4} are removed step-wise by gamma-glutamyltransferase and a dipeptidase to form sequentially LTD_{4} and LTE_{4}. The decision to form LTB_{4} versus LTC_{4} depends on the relative content of LTA_{4} hydrolase versus LTC_{4} synthase (or glutathione S-transferase in cells; eosinophils, mast cells, and alveolar macrophages possess relatively high levels of LTC_{4} synthase and accordingly form LTC_{4} rather than or to a far greater extent than LTB_{4}. 5-LOX may also work in series with cytochrome P450 oxygenases or aspirin-treated COX2 to form Resolvins RvE1, RvE2, and 18S-RvE1 (see Specialized pro-resolving mediators § EPA-derived resolvins).

The enzyme arachidonate 12-lipoxygenase (12-LO or ALOX12) metabolizes arachidonic acid to the S stereoisomer of 12-hydroperoxyeicosatetraenoic acid (12-HPETE) which is rapidly reduced by cellular peroxidases to the S stereoisomer of 12-hydroxyeicosatetraenoic acid (12-HETE) or further metabolized to hepoxilins (Hx) such as HxA3 and HxB.

The enzymes 15-lipoxygenase-1 (15-LO-1 or ALOX15) and 15-lipoxygenase-2 (15-LO-2, ALOX15B) metabolize arachidonic acid to the S stereoisomer of 15-hydroperoxyeicosatetraenoic acid (15(S)-HPETE) which is rapidly reduced by cellular peroxidases to the S stereoisomer of 15-hydroxyeicosatetraenoic acid (15(S)-HETE). The 15-lipoxygenases (particularly ALOX15) may also act in series with 5-lipoxygenase, 12-lipoxygenase, or aspirin-treated COX2 to form the lipoxins and epi-lipoxins or with P450 oxygenases or aspirin-treated COX2 to form Resolvin E3 (see Specialized pro-resolving mediators § EPA-derived resolvins).

A subset of cytochrome P450 (CYP450) microsome-bound ω hydroxylases metabolize arachidonic acid to 20-hydroxyeicosatetraenoic acid (20-HETE) and 19-hydroxyeicosatetraenoic acid by an omega oxidation reaction.

=== Epoxyeicosanoid pathway ===
The human cytochrome P450 (CYP) epoxygenases, CYP1A1, CYP1A2, CYP2C8, CYP2C9, CYP2C18, CYP2C19, CYP2E1, CYP2J2, and CYP2S1 metabolize arachidonic acid to the non-classic epoxyeicosatrienoic acids (EETs) by converting one of the fatty acid's double bonds to its epoxide to form one or more of the following EETs, 14,15-ETE, 11,12-EET, 8,9-ETE, and 4,5-ETE. 14,15-EET and 11,12-EET are the major EETs produced by mammalian, including human, tissues. The same CYPs but also CYP4A1, CYP4F8, and CYP4F12 metabolize eicosapentaenoic acid to five epoxide epoxyeicosatetraenoic acids (EEQs) viz., 17,18-EEQ, 14,15-EEQ, 11,12-EEQ. 8,9-EEQ, and 5,6-EEQ.

== Function, pharmacology, and clinical significance ==
The following table lists a sampling of the major eicosanoids that possess clinically relevant biological activity, the cellular receptors (see Cell surface receptor) that they stimulate or, where noted, antagonize to attain this activity, some of the major functions which they regulate (either promote or inhibit) in humans and mouse models, and some of their relevancies to human diseases.

Eicosanoid	Targeted receptors	Functions regulated	Clinical relevancy
PGE_{2}	PTGER1, PTGER2, PTGER3, PTGER4	inflammation; fever; pain perception; allodynia; parturition	NSAIDs inhibit its production to reduce inflammation, fever, and pain; used to promote labor in childbirth; an abortifacient
PGD_{2}	Prostaglandin DP1 receptor 1, Prostaglandin DP2 receptor	allergy reactions; allodynia; hair growth	NSAIDs may target it to inhibit allodynia and male-pattern hair loss
TXA_{2}	Thromboxane receptor α and β	blood platelet aggregation; blood clotting; allergic reactions	NSAIDs inhibit its production to reduce incidence of strokes and heart attacks
PGI_{2}	Prostacyclin receptor	platelet aggregation, vascular smooth muscle contraction	PGI2 analogs used to treat vascular disorders like pulmonary hypertension, Raynaud's syndrome, and Buerger's disease
15-d-Δ12,14-PGJ_{2}	PPARγ, Prostaglandin DP2 receptor	inhibits inflammation and cell growth	inhibits diverse inflammatory responses in animal models; structural model for developing anti-inflammatory agents
20-HETE	?	vasoconstriction, inhibits platelets	inactivating mutations in the 20-HETE-forming enzyme, CYP2U1, associated with hereditary spastic paraplegia
5-Oxo-ETE	OXER1	chemotactic factor for and activator of eosinophils	studies needed to determine if inhibiting its production or action inhibits allergic reactions
LTB_{4}	LTB4R, LTB4R2	chemotactic factor for and activator of leukocytes; inflammation	studies to date shown no clear benefits of LTB_{4} receptor antagonists for human inflammatory diseases
LTC_{4}	CYSLTR1, CYSLTR2, GPR17	vascular permeability; vascular smooth muscle contraction; allergy	antagonists of CYSLTR1 used in asthma as well as other allergic and allergic-like reactions
LTD_{4}	CYSLTR1, CYSLTR2, GPR17	vascular permeability; vascular smooth muscle contraction; allergy	antagonists of CYSLTR1 used in asthma as well as other allergic and allergic-like reactions
LTE_{4}	GPR99	increases vascular permeability and airway mucin secretion	thought to contribute to asthma as well as other allergic and allergic-like reactions
LxA_{4}	FPR2	inhibits functions of pro-inflammatory cells	Specialized pro-resolving mediators class of inflammatory reaction suppressors
LxB_{4}	FPR2, GPR32, AHR	inhibits functions of pro-inflammatory cells	Specialized pro-resolving mediators class of inflammatory reaction suppressors
RvE1	CMKLR1, inhibits BLT, TRPV1, TRPV3, NMDAR, TNFR	inhibits functions of pro-inflammatory cells	Specialized pro-resolving mediators class of inflammatory reaction suppressors; also suppresses pain perception
RvE2	CMKLR1, receptor antagonist of BLT	inhibits functions of pro-inflammatory cells	Specialized pro-resolving mediators class of inflammatory reaction suppressors
14,15-EET	?	vasodilation, inhibits platelets and pro-inflammatory cells	role(s) in human disease not yet proven

=== Prostanoids ===
Many of the prostanoids are known to mediate local symptoms of inflammation: vasoconstriction or vasodilation, coagulation, pain, and fever. Inhibition of COX-1 and/or the inducible COX-2 isoforms is the hallmark of NSAIDs (non-steroidal anti-inflammatory drugs), such as aspirin. Prostanoids also activate the PPAR_{γ} members of the steroid/thyroid family of nuclear hormone receptors, and directly influence gene transcription. Prostanoids have numerous other relevancies to clinical medicine as evidence by their use, the use of their more stable pharmacological analogs, of the use of their receptor antagonists as indicated in the following chart.

Medicine	Type	Medical condition or use	Medicine	Type	Medical condition or use
Alprostadil	PGE_{1}	Erectile dysfunction, maintaining a patent ductus arteriosus in the fetus	Beraprost	PGI_{2} analog	Pulmonary hypertension, avoiding reperfusion injury
Bimatoprost	PGF_{2α} analog	Glaucoma, ocular hypertension	Carboprost	PGF_{2α} analog	Labor induction, abortifacient in early pregnancy
Dinoprostone	PGE_{2}	Labor induction	Iloprost	PGI_{2} analog	Pulmonary artery hypertension
Latanoprost	PGF_{2α} analog	Glaucoma, ocular hypertension	Misoprostol	PGE_{1} analog	Stomach ulcers labor induction, abortifacient
Travoprost	PGF_{2α} analog	Glaucoma, ocular hypertension	U46619	Longer lived TX analog	Research only

=== Cyclopentenone prostaglandins ===
PGA_{1}, PGA_{2}, PGJ_{2}, Δ12-PGJ_{2}, and 15-deox-Δ12,14-PGJ_{2} exhibit a wide range of anti-inflammatory and inflammation-resolving actions in diverse animal models. They therefore appear to function in a manner similar to specialized pro-resolving mediators although one of their mechanisms of action, forming covalent bonds with key signaling proteins, differs from those of the specialized pro-resolving mediators.

=== HETEs and oxo-ETEs ===
As indicated in their individual Wikipedia pages, 5-hydroxyeicosatetraenoic acid (which, like 5-oxo-eicosatetraenoic acid, acts through the OXER1 receptor), 5-oxo-eicosatetraenoic acid, 12-hydroxyeicosatetraenoic acid, 15-hydroxyeicosatetraenoic acid, and 20-hydroxyeicosatetraenoic acid show numerous activities in animal and human cells as well as in animal models that are related to, for example, inflammation, allergic reactions, cancer cell growth, blood flow to tissues, and/or blood pressure. However, their function and relevancy to human physiology and pathology have not as yet been shown.

=== Leukotrienes ===
The three cysteinyl leukotrienes, LTC_{4}, LTD_{4}, and LTE_{4}, are potent bronchoconstrictors, increasers of vascular permeability in postcapillary venules, and stimulators of mucus secretion that are released from the lung tissue of asthmatic subjects exposed to specific allergens. They play a pathophysiological role in diverse types of immediate hypersensitivity reactions. Drugs that block their activation of the CYSLTR1 receptor viz., montelukast, zafirlukast, and pranlukast, are used clinically as maintenance treatment for allergen-induced asthma and rhinitis; nonsteroidal anti-inflammatory drug-induced asthma and rhinitis (see aspirin-exacerbated respiratory disease); exercise- and cold-air induced asthma (see Exercise-induced bronchoconstriction); and childhood sleep apnea due to adenotonsillar hypertrophy (see Acquired non-inflammatory myopathy § Diet and Trauma Induced Myopathy). When combined with antihistamine drug therapy, they also appear useful for treating urticarial diseases such as hives.

=== Lipoxins and epi-lipoxins ===
LxA_{4}, LxB_{4}, 15-epi-LxA_{4}, and 15-epi-LXB_{4}, like other members of the specialized pro-resolving mediators class of eicosanoids, possess anti-inflammatory and inflammation resolving activity. In a randomized controlled trial, AT-LXA_{4} and a comparatively stable analog of LXB_{4}, 15R/S-methyl-LXB_{4}, reduced the severity of eczema in a study of 60 infants and, in another study, inhaled LXA_{4} decreased LTC_{4}-initiated bronchoprovocation in patients with asthma.

=== Eoxins ===
The eoxins (EXC_{4}, EXD_{4}, EXE_{5}) are newly described. They stimulate vascular permeability in an ex vivo human vascular endothelial model system, and in a small study of 32 volunteers EXC_{4} production by eosinophils isolated from severe and aspirin-intolerant asthmatics was greater than that from healthy volunteers and mild asthmatic patients; these findings have been suggested to indicate that the eoxins have pro-inflammatory actions and therefore potentially involved in various allergic reactions. Production of eoxins by Reed–Sternberg cells has also led to suggestion that they are involved in Hodgkins disease. However, the clinical significance of eoxins has not yet been demonstrated.

=== Resolvin metabolites of eicosapentaenoic acid ===
RvE1, 18S-RvE1, RvE2, and RvE3, like other members of the specialized pro-resolving mediators) class of eicosanoids, possess anti-inflammatory and inflammation resolving activity. A synthetic analog of RvE1 is in clinical phase III testing (see Phases of clinical research) for the treatment of the inflammation-based dry eye syndrome; along with this study, other clinical trials (NCT01639846, NCT01675570, NCT00799552 and NCT02329743) using an RvE1 analogue to treat various ocular conditions are underway. RvE1 is also in clinical development studies for the treatment of neurodegenerative diseases and hearing loss.

=== Other metabolites of eicosapentaenoic acid ===
The metabolites of eicosapentaenoic acid that are analogs of their arachidonic acid-derived prostanoid, HETE, and LT counterparts include: the 3-series prostanoids (e.g. PGE_{3}, PGD_{3}, PGF_{3α}, PGI_{3}, and TXA_{3}), the hydroxyeicosapentaenoic acids (e.g. 5-HEPE, 12-HEPE, 15-HEPE, and 20-HEPE), and the 5-series LTs (e.g. LTB_{5}, LTC_{5}, LTD_{5}, and LTE_{5}). Many of the 3-series prostanoids, the hydroxyeicosapentaenoic acids, and the 5-series LT have been shown or thought to be weaker stimulators of their target cells and tissues than their arachidonic acid-derived analogs. They are proposed to reduce the actions of their arachidonate-derived analogs by replacing their production with weaker analogs. Eicosapentaenoic acid-derived counterparts of the eoxins have not been described.

=== Epoxyeicosanoids ===
The epoxy eicosatrienoic acids (or EETs)—and, presumably, the epoxy eicosatetraenoic acids—have vasodilating actions on heart, kidney, and other blood vessels as well as on the kidney's reabsorption of sodium and water, and act to reduce blood pressure and ischemic and other injuries to the heart, brain, and other tissues; they may also act to reduce inflammation, promote the growth and metastasis of certain tumors, promote the growth of new blood vessels, in the central nervous system, regulate the release of neuropeptide hormones, and in the peripheral nervous system inhibit or reduce pain perception.

== The ω−3 and ω−6 series ==
The reduction in AA-derived eicosanoids and the diminished activity of the alternative products generated from ω-3 fatty acids serve as the foundation for explaining some of the beneficial effects of greater ω-3 intake.

— Kevin Fritsche, Fatty Acids as Modulators of the Immune Response

Arachidonic acid (AA; 20:4 ω−6) sits at the head of the "arachidonic acid cascade" – more than twenty eicosanoid-mediated signaling paths controlling a wide array of cellular functions, especially those regulating inflammation, immunity, and the central nervous system.

In the inflammatory response, two other groups of dietary fatty acids form cascades that parallel and compete with the arachidonic acid cascade. EPA (20:5 ω−3) provides the most important competing cascade. DGLA (20:3 ω−6) provides a third, less prominent cascade. These two parallel cascades soften the inflammatory effects of AA and its products. Low dietary intake of these less-inflammatory fatty acids, especially the ω−3s, has been linked to several inflammation-related diseases, and perhaps some mental illnesses.

The U.S. National Institutes of Health and the National Library of Medicine state that there is 'A' level evidence that increased dietary ω−3 improves outcomes in hypertriglyceridemia, secondary cardiovascular disease prevention, and hypertension. There is 'B' level evidence ('good scientific evidence') for increased dietary ω−3 in primary prevention of cardiovascular disease, rheumatoid arthritis, and protection from ciclosporin toxicity in organ transplant patients. They also note more preliminary evidence showing that dietary ω−3 can ease symptoms in several psychiatric disorders.

Besides the influence on eicosanoids, dietary polyunsaturated fats modulate immune response through three other molecular mechanisms. They (a) alter membrane composition and function, including the composition of lipid rafts; (b) change cytokine biosynthesis; and (c) directly activate gene transcription. Of these, the action on eicosanoids is the best explored

Recent data in 2024 has emerged that neuronal integrity breakdown was reduced by ω−3 treatment in APOE*E4 carriers, suggesting that this treatment may be beneficial for this specific group suggested fish oil supplements might help older adults fight Alzheimer's disease.

=== Mechanisms of ω−3 action ===
EFA sources: Essential fatty acid production and metabolism to form eicosanoids. At each step, the ω−3 and ω−6 cascades compete for the enzymes.

In general, the eicosanoids derived from AA promote inflammation, and those from EPA and from GLA (via DGLA) are less inflammatory, or inactive, or even anti-inflammatory and pro-resolving.

The figure shows the ω−3 and −6 synthesis chains, along with the major eicosanoids from AA, EPA, and DGLA.

Dietary ω−3 and GLA counter the inflammatory effects of AA's eicosanoids in three ways, along the eicosanoid pathways:

- Displacement—Dietary ω−3 decreases tissue concentrations of AA, so there is less to form ω−6 eicosanoids.
- Competitive inhibition—DGLA and EPA compete with AA for access to the cyclooxygenase and lipoxygenase enzymes. So the presence of DGLA and EPA in tissues lowers the output of AA's eicosanoids.
- Counteraction—Some DGLA and EPA derived eicosanoids counteract their AA derived counterparts.

=== Role in inflammation ===
Since antiquity, the cardinal signs of inflammation have been known as: calor (warmth), dolor (pain), tumor (swelling), and rubor (redness). The eicosanoids are involved with each of these signs.

Redness—An insect's sting will trigger the classic inflammatory response. Short acting vasoconstrictors — TXA_{2} — are released quickly after the injury. The site may momentarily turn pale. Then TXA_{2} mediates the release of the vasodilators PGE_{2} and LTB_{4}. The blood vessels engorge and the injury reddens.
Swelling—LTB_{4} makes the blood vessels more permeable. Plasma leaks out into the connective tissues, and they swell. The process also loses pro-inflammatory cytokines.
Pain—The cytokines increase COX-2 activity. This elevates levels of PGE_{2}, sensitizing pain neurons.
Heat—PGE_{2} is also a potent pyretic agent. Aspirin and NSAIDS—drugs that block the COX pathways and stop prostanoid synthesis—limit fever or the heat of localized inflammation.

== History ==
In 1930, gynecologist Raphael Kurzrok and pharmacologist Charles Leib characterized prostaglandin as a component of semen. Between 1929 and 1932, George and Mildred Burr showed that restricting fat from animals' diets led to a deficiency disease, and first described the essential fatty acids. In 1935, von Euler identified prostaglandin. In 1964, Bergström and Samuelsson linked these observations when they showed that the "classical" eicosanoids were derived from arachidonic acid, which had earlier been considered to be one of the essential fatty acids. In 1971, Vane showed that aspirin and similar drugs inhibit prostaglandin synthesis. Von Euler received the Nobel Prize in medicine in 1970, which Samuelsson, Vane, and Bergström also received in 1982. E. J. Corey received it in chemistry in 1990 largely for his synthesis of prostaglandins.

== See also ==
- Eicosanoid receptors
