= Cysteinyl-leukotriene type 1 receptor antagonists =

Class of drugs that hinder the action of leukotriene

- Drug class
- Montelukast the most common used leukotriene type 1 antagonist

Class identifiers
- Synonyms: Cysteinyl-leukotriene type 1 receptor antagonist, CysLT type 1 receptor antagonist, CysLT1 receptor antagonist, Antileukotriene
- Use: Exercise-induced bronchoconstriction, Allergic rhinitis, Asthma
- ATC code: R03DC
- Biological target: Cysteinyl leukotriene receptor 1

Clinical data
- Drugs.com: Drug Classes

Legal status

Cysteinyl-leukotriene type 1 receptor (CysLTR1) antagonists are a class of medications that block the action of cysteinyl leukotrienes, potent inflammatory mediators involved in various allergic and inflammatory conditions, particularly asthma and allergic rhinitis.

These drugs, including montelukast, zafirlukast, and pranlukast, work by selectively binding to and inhibiting CysLTR1, thereby preventing the pro-inflammatory effects of cysteinyl leukotrienes. CysLTR1 antagonists have been widely used in clinical practice since the late 1990s, primarily as add-on therapy for asthma management and as an alternative to inhaled corticosteroids in mild persistent asthma. In addition to their primary mechanism of action, these agents have been found to possess secondary anti-inflammatory properties independent of CysLTR1 antagonism, which may contribute to their therapeutic efficacy. While their main applications remain in asthma and allergic rhinitis, ongoing research is exploring their potential benefits in other inflammatory disorders affecting multiple organ systems. These drugs are used to treat asthma, relieve individuals of seasonal allergies rhinitis and prevention of exercise-induced bronchoconstriction. There are currently three different types of drugs within the CysLT_{1} family, zafirlukast which was first on the market being released in 1996, montelukast which was released in 1998 and pranlukast which was released in 2007.

== Medical Uses ==
The medical uses for Cysteinyl-leukotriene type 1 receptor antagonists are for chronic and prophylactic treatment of asthma. Other indications have been approved by the FDA for montelukast and they are used for the prevention of exercise-induced bronchoconstriction (EIB), relief of symptoms of allergic rhinitis (AR) that is for relief of seasonal allergic rhinitis and perennial allergic rhinitis (PAR).

== Adverse effects ==
The actions of CysLT_{1} receptor antagonists (montelukast, zafirlukast and pranlukast) are competitive, as such they hinder the actions of leukotrienes. They prevent different types of asthmatic responses as well as having effects on bronchoconstriction and inflammation. Adverse effects often follow the use of these medications.

=== Montelukast ===
Montelukast has been tested in clinical trials under different conditions to observe different adverse effects. The most common side effects for montelukast are, for example, respiratory infection, fever, headache, cough, abdominal pain, otitis media, rhinorrhea, sinusitis and more.

=== Zafirlukast ===
The adverse effects of zafirlukast are very similar to montelukast. There is a database for safety which incorporates more than 4000 volunteers and 1723 patients which were asthmatic. Some of the side effects are similar to that of montelukast for example headache, infection, abdominal pain, fever, and multiple others.

== Mechanism of action ==
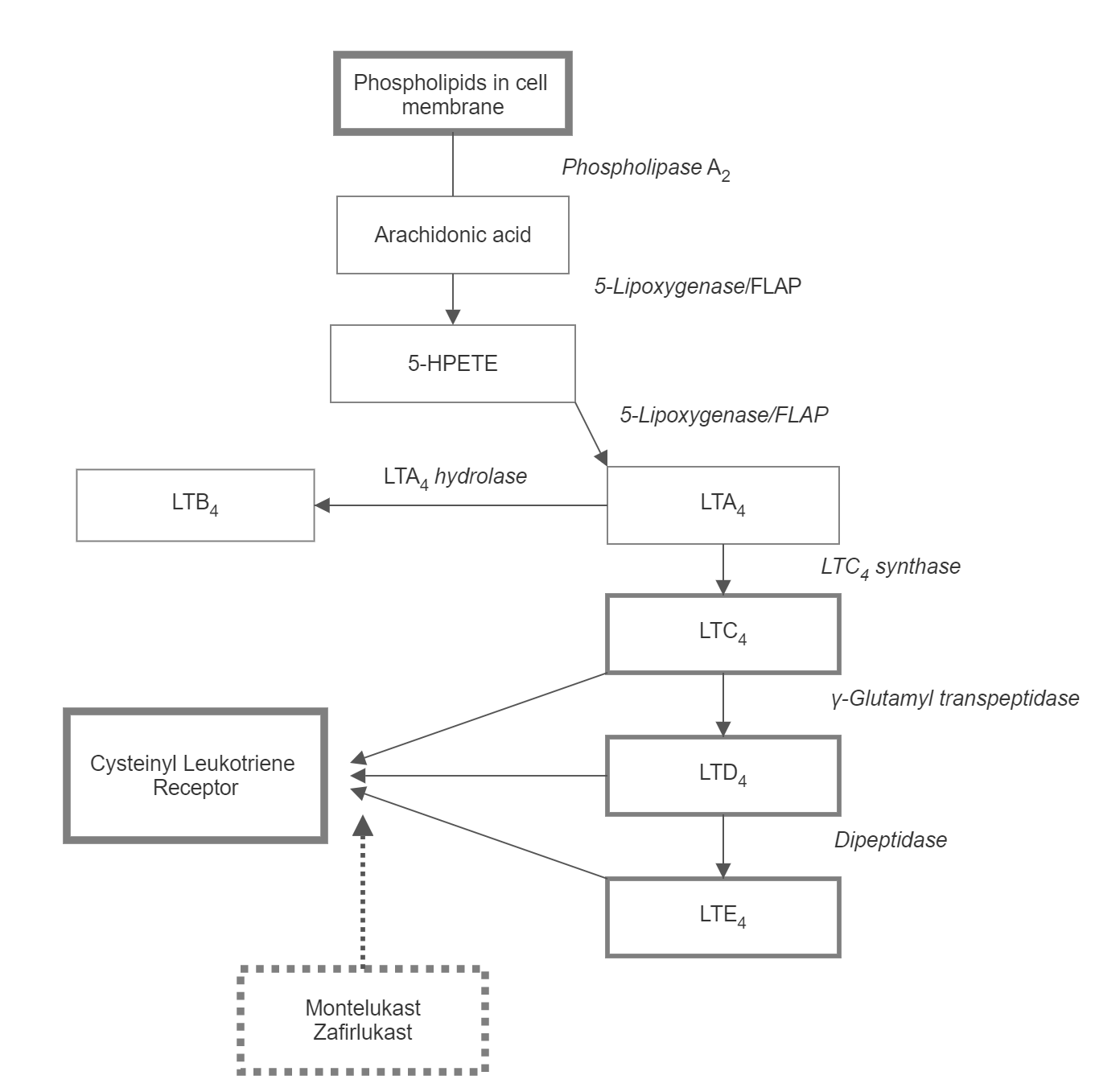
The biosynthesis for leukotrienes as well as the mechanism of action of cysteinyl leukotriene receptor type 1 antagonists

The cysteinyl leukotrienes (LTC_{4}, LTD_{4}, LTE_{4}) are powerful inflammatory inducing eicosanoids that are produced and released by various cells of the immune system. Leukotrienes are produced from arachidonic acid by 5-lipoxygenase (which is made from phospholipids in the cell membrane) and other various enzymes. The cells of the immune system that release leukotrienes are basophils, eosinophils, mast cells and macrophages following various stimuli for example allergens. They bind to cysteinyl leukotriene receptors (CysLT). One of those receptors is CysLT type-1 (CysLT1) and can be found in many different parts of the human airway as well as on pro-inflammatory cells. The CysLT receptors have been linked to the pathophysiology of allergic rhinitis and asthma.

Zafirlukast and montelukast are powerful CysLT type-1 receptor antagonists. The primary actions of these drugs are that they block the action of leukotrienes, by binding to the receptor with antagonistic action without having an agonistic effect. The primary purpose of the antagonists is to block the actions of leukotriene D4 (LTD_{4}) By competing with LTD_{4} it will result in reduced effect by the leukotrienes, for example, LTD_{4} which has bronchoconstriction and vasoconstricting effect, as well as bronchial asthma and inflammation.

== Pharmacokinetics ==
When comparing the pharmacokinetic properties of montelukast and zafirlukast the two drugs have many similarities. The peak plasma concentrations are around 2,5-4 hours depending on what form is given. Both drugs are plasma protein-bound (-99%) and in vitro studies with rats have indicated low distribution across the blood-brain-barrier. Metabolism of montelukast and zafirlukast are extensive. Montelukast is mainly metabolized CYP2C8 and zafirlukast by CYP2C9. The half-life of montelukast is 2,7-5,5 hours and zafirlukast 8-16 hours.

== Structure Activity Relationships (SAR) ==
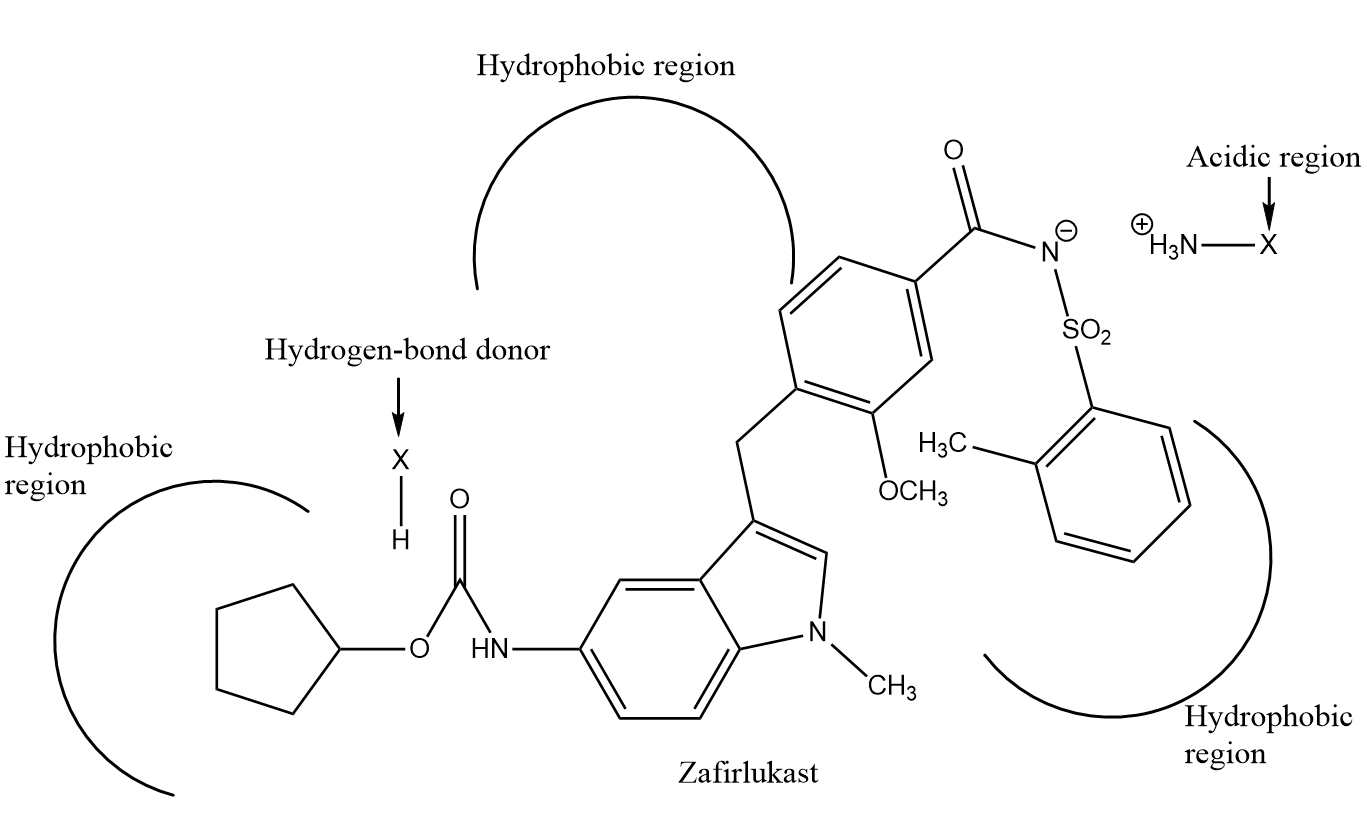
This is an example of zafirlukasts pharmacophore

When looking for leukotriene receptor antagonists, researchers began without any assistance of ligand-receptor binding data and approached the issue in three different ways. Those approaches included the structural design of leukotriene analogues, quinoline analogues, and the randomized screening of compounds. Those combined efforts led to a simple SAR: The lipophilic tetraene tail of LTD_{4} can be imitated by several of more stable aromatic rings, the sulfide of the glycyl-cysteine dipeptide can be supplanted by an alkyl carboxylic acid, and the C1 Carboxylate of LTD_{4} must be maintained. Further research prioritizing on the three-dimensional demands for antagonist binding to the CysLT receptors elucidated that the pharmacophore requires an acidic negative ionizable usable group, a hydrogen-bond acceptor role, and three hydrophobic regions. From this research, synthetic endeavours lead to the development of montelukast and zafirlukast as cysteinyl-leukotriene type 1 receptor antagonists.

Quinolines were shown to be good moiety for CysLT_{1} receptor antagonist. From weak antagonistic derivatives of quinolines, montelukast was developed. Several changes to the structure can be made without the loss of activity. Among these changes are reducing the quinoline ring, replacing the chlorine with fluorine, inserting an ether linkage in between the two aromatic rings instead of the double bond and adding an amide group for the sulfur. Replacement of the quinoline by benzothiazole, dichlorothienopyridines or alkyl-substituted thiazoles is possible but none of these is superior.

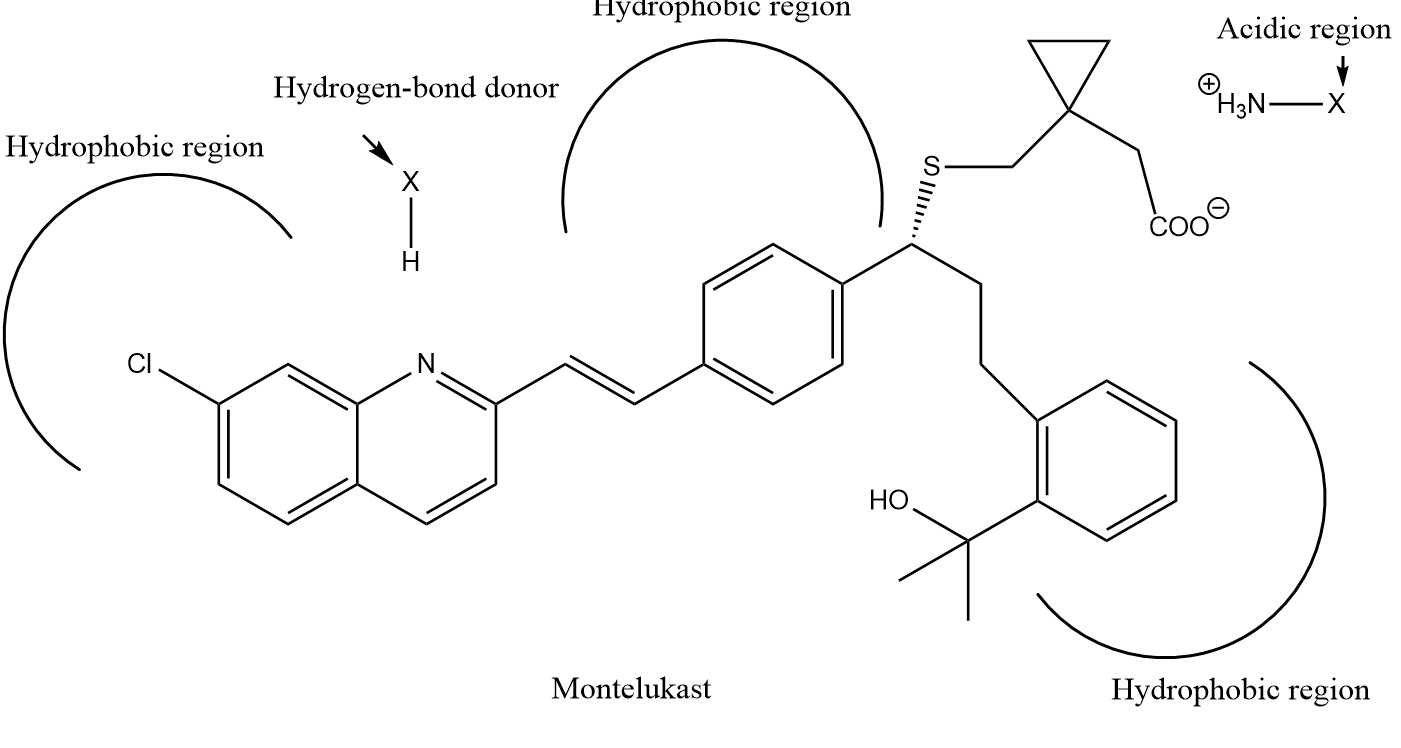
This is an example of montelukasts pharmacophore

Zafirlukast is an indole derivative that satisfies the pharmacophore need for an ionizable moiety with a sulfonamide group. Numerous analogues have been organized; nonetheless, everyone of them resulted in diminishing antagonistic activity. Like montelukast, zafirlukast antagonizes bronchoconstrictive by selectively antagonising the CysLT1 receptor and affects all of the leukotrienes (LTC_{4}, LTD_{4}, and LTE_{4}).

The qualitative structural requirements and pharmacophore for CysLT_{1} antagonists were designed from the structural similarity of the agonist LTD_{4}. But that has its limitations as agonist and antagonist do not necessarily bind in the same manner nor to the same site. So the importance of certain moiety may be overestimated and some moieties may be overlooked.

== Synthesis ==
An example for the synthesis of montelukast sodium

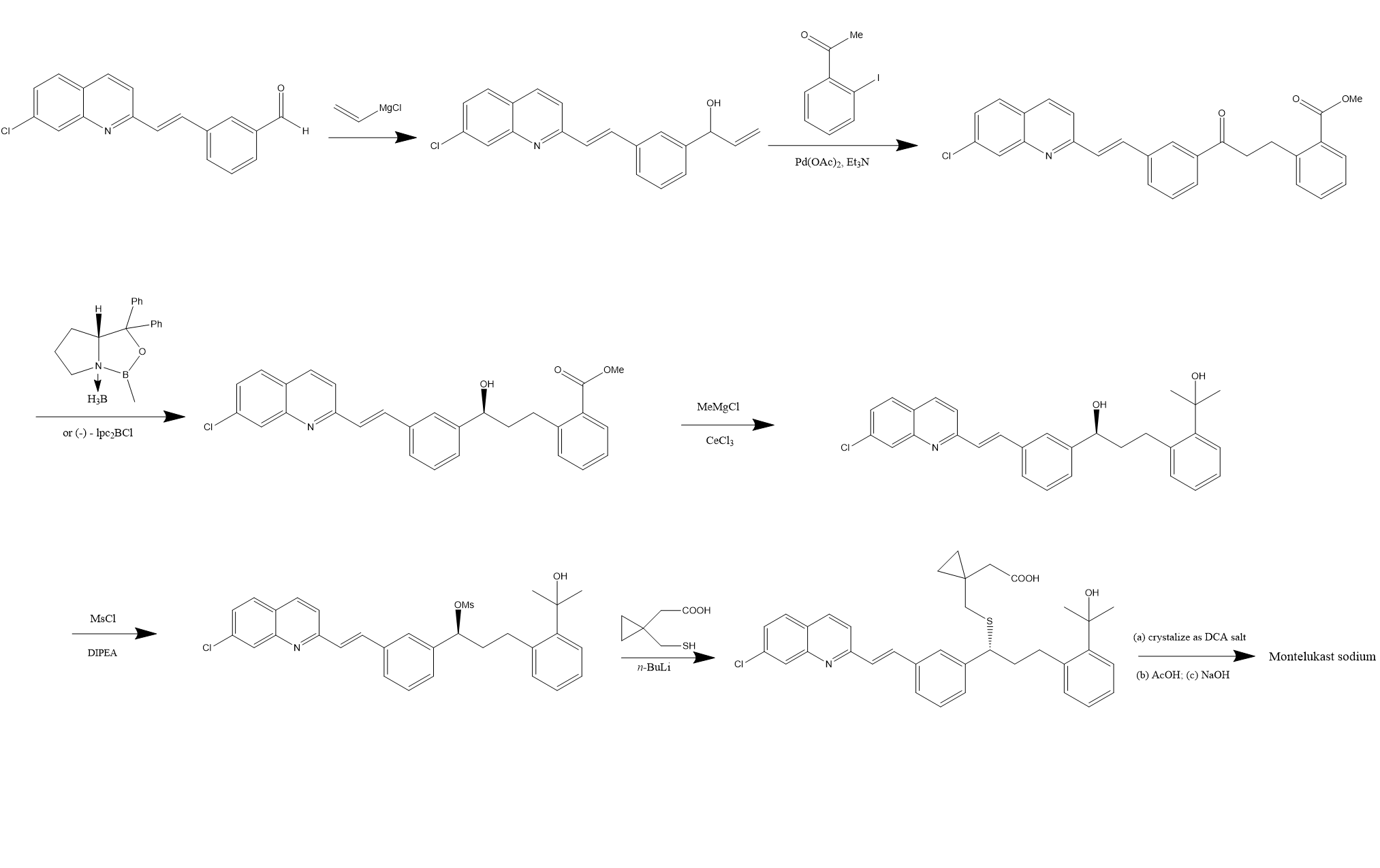
An example for the synthesis of montelukast

An example for the synthesis of zafirlukast

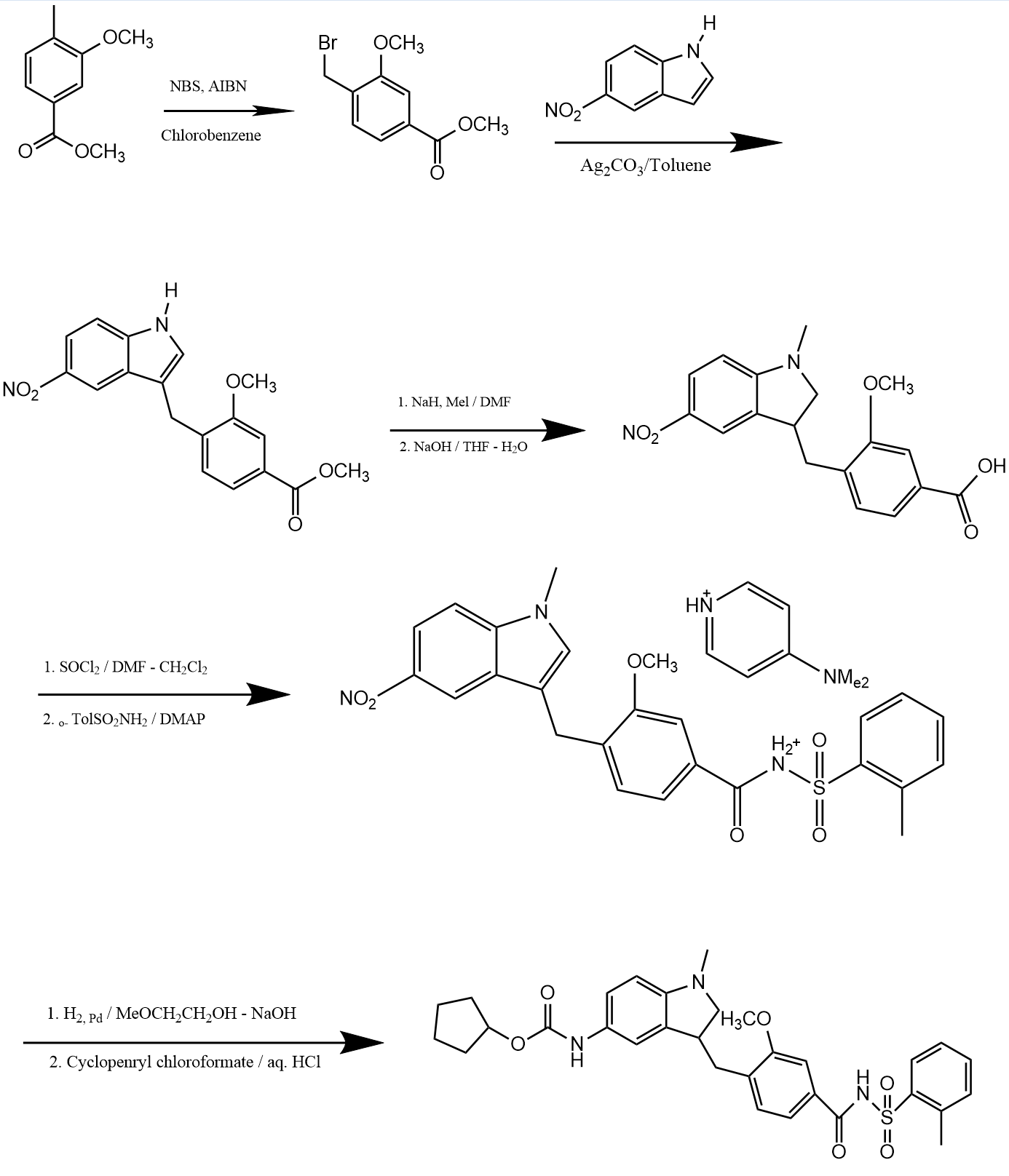
An example for the synthesis of zafirlukast

== History ==
The receptor for cysteinyl leukotrienes LTC_{4}, LTD_{4} and LTE_{4} are a viable target because of the importance of cysteinyl leukotrienes in mediating the responses in asthma. It has been discovered that two types of said receptor exist, the CysLT_{1} receptor as well as the CysLT_{2} receptor. Leukotriene-receptor antagonists is a special class of drug, formulated as tablets that have both an anti-inflammatory effect as well as a bronchodilating effect.

The development of leukotriene receptor antagonist started with screening a large number of compounds and designing quinoline and structural analogues. An example of a CysLT_{1} receptor antagonists is montelukast which is a quinoline derivative and zafirlukast which is an indole derivative. Both CysLT_{1} selective antagonists. Zafirlukast was the first approved CysLT_{1} receptor antagonist in the USA in September 26th 1996. There are 2 other main medications that have been approved across the world, for example, montelukast which was approved February 2nd, 1996 and pranlukast which was approved March 15th, 2007.

There hasn't just been interest in the CysLT_{1} receptor, there has also been interest in the CysLT_{2} receptor which can be found in smooth muscle cells in the airways, as well as inflammatory cells and endothelial cells, which may be a useful target for asthma patients. There have been discoveries of dual CysLT_{1} and CysLT_{2} receptor antagonists, for example, Gemilukast which could be a useful therapeutic agent for asthma patients which are non-responsive to montelukast, zafirlukast and pranlukast.

== See also ==
- Antileukotriene
- Arachidonate 5-lipoxygenase inhibitor
- Antihistamines
