= Maria Abbracchio =

Italian pharmacologist

Maria Pia Abbracchio
- Born: Maria Pia Abbracchio; Milan, Italy
- Occupation: Research pharmacologist
- Known for: identifying the purinergic receptor GPR17

Maria Pia Abbracchio is an Italian pharmacologist who researches the biochemical effect of drugs at the cellular level who has conducted research all over the world and is one of the scientists Thomson Reuters has named as most cited scientists since 2006. She is known for her work with purinergic receptors and identification of GPR17. In 2014, she was awarded the Order of Merit of the Italian Republic for her individual scientific accomplishments.

== Biography ==
Maria Pia Abbracchio was born in Milan and completed her initial education there. In 1979, she earned a master's degree in pharmacy and then studied as a post-graduate from 1980 to 1981 at the University of Texas Health Science Center at Houston. In 1984, she completed a specialization in toxicology from the University of Milan, a PhD in Experimental Medicine at Rome in 1988, and post-doctoral studies as an Honorary Research Fellow at the University College London from 1992 to 1993.

In 1994, she worked with Professor Geoffrey Burnstock, the scientist who named purinergic receptors and then she became the founder of the Purine Club, a non-profit scientific association for international researchers studying the pathophysiology of purinergic transmission.

Since 2003, she has worked with an interdisciplinary group of scientists to improve scientific research at institutions both within Italy and abroad. In 2006, Abbracchio presented findings at a symposium in Atlanta for the Society for Neuroscience which illustrates the approach of using biochemical compounds at the cellular level to inhibit brain damage after stroke. Her work has proven that G-protein-coupled receptors (GPCR)s play a role in controlling cellular behavior.

By combining research efforts from various scientific disciplines, scientists are looking at neurodegenerative diseases like Parkinson's, Alzheimer's, multiple sclerosis and even heart attacks and stroke to see how various drugs interact with GPCRs. One receptor identified early in her research by Abbracchio, called GPR17, has shown that it reacts with certain drugs to reduce brain inflammations and improve memory and learning abilities.

Abbracchio is a full professor of pharmacology at the University of Milan and directs a team of 12 scientific researchers at the Research Observatory of the university. She has authored or co-authored some 150 scientific papers and since 2006 has been listed on the Thomson Reuters list of most cited researchers. In 2014, she was awarded the level of Commander in the Order of Merit of the Italian Republic by the President of Italy, Giorgio Napolitano.
