= Cysteinyl leukotriene receptor 1 =

Protein-coding gene in humans

CYSLTR1

Identifiers
- Aliases: CYSLTR1, CYSLT1, CYSLT1R, CYSLTR, HMTMF81, cysteinyl leukotriene receptor 1
- External IDs: OMIM: 300201; MGI: 1926218; GeneCards: CYSLTR1

Gene location (Human)
Chr.	X chromosome (human)
Band	Xq21.1	Start	78,271,468 bp
Band	Xq21.1	End	78,327,691 bp

Gene location (Mouse)
Chr.	X chromosome (mouse)
Band	X|X D	Start	105,617,952 bp
Band	X|X D	End	105,647,285 bp
RNA expression pattern
Bgee	Human / Mouse (ortholog); Top expressed in: buccal mucosa cell; monocyte; testicle; superficial temporal artery; granulocyte; bone marrow; lymph node; blood; palpebral conjunctiva; Achilles tendon / Top expressed in: embryo; sciatic nerve; carotid body; embryo; skin of external ear; stroma of bone marrow; muscle of thigh; mucosa of small intestine; ankle; Epithelium of choroid plexus; More reference expression data
BioGPS	n/a
Gene ontology
Molecular function	G protein-coupled peptide receptor activity; G protein-coupled receptor activity; leukotriene receptor activity; signal transducer activity; protein binding; galanin receptor activity
Cellular component	integral component of membrane; membrane; plasma membrane; integral component of plasma membrane
Biological process	defense response; positive regulation of cytosolic calcium ion concentration; respiratory gaseous exchange by respiratory system; chemotaxis; phospholipase C-activating G protein-coupled receptor signaling pathway; cell surface receptor signaling pathway; leukotriene signaling pathway; circulatory system process; neuropeptide signaling pathway; calcium ion transport; signal transduction; inflammatory response to antigenic stimulus; G protein-coupled receptor signaling pathway
Sources:Amigo / QuickGO
Orthologs
Databases	NCBI: entry; OMA: entry
Species	Human	Mouse
Entrez	10800	58861
Ensembl	ENSG00000173198	ENSMUSG00000052821
UniProt	Q9Y271	Q99JA4
RefSeq (mRNA)	NM_006639; NM_001282186; NM_001282187; NM_001282188	NM_001281859; NM_001281862; NM_021476
RefSeq (protein)	NP_001269115; NP_001269116; NP_001269117; NP_006630	NP_001268788; NP_001268791; NP_067451
Location (UCSC)	Chr X: 78.27 – 78.33 Mb	Chr X: 105.62 – 105.65 Mb
PubMed search
- Wikidata
View/Edit Human	View/Edit Mouse

Cysteinyl leukotriene receptor 1, also termed CYSLTR1, is a receptor for cysteinyl leukotrienes (LT) (see cysteinyl leukotrienes). CYSLTR1, by binding these cysteinyl LTs (CysLTs; viz, LTC4, LTD4, and to a much lesser extent, LTE4) contributes to mediating various allergic and hypersensitivity reactions in humans as well as models of the reactions in other animals.

== Gene ==
The human CysLTR1 gene maps to the X chromosome at position Xq13-Xq21, contains three exons with the entire open reading frame located in exon 3, and codes for a protein composed of 337 amino acids. The CYSLTR1 gene promoter region is distanced from 665 to 30 bp upstream of its transcription start site.

== Expression ==
CYSLTR1 mRNA is expressed in lung smooth muscle, lung macrophages, monocytes, eosinophils, basophils, neutrophils, platelets, T cells, B lymphocytes, pluripotent hematopoietic stem cells (CD34+), mast cells, pancreas, small intestine, prostate, interstitial cells of the nasal mucosa, airway smooth muscle cells, bronchial fibroblasts and vascular endothelial cells.

== Function ==
CysLTR1 is a G protein–coupled receptor that links to and when bound to its CysLT ligands activates the Gq alpha subunit and/or Ga subunit of its coupled G protein, depending on the cell type. Acting through these G proteins and their subunits, ligand-bound CysLTR1 activates a series of pathways that lead to cell function; the order of potency of the cysLTs in stimulating CysLTR1 is LTD4>LTC4>LTE4 with LTE4 probably lacking sufficient potency to have much activity that operates through CysLTR1 in vivo.

CysLTR1 activation by LTC4 and/or LTD4 in animal models and humans causes: airway bronchoconstriction and hyper-responsiveness to bronchoconstriction agents such as histamine; increased vascular permeability, edema, influx of eosinophils and neutrophils, smooth muscle proliferation, collagen deposition, and fibrosis in various tissue sites; and mucin secretion by goblet cells, goblet cell metaplasia, and epithelial cell hypertrophy in the membranes of the respiratory system. Animal model and human tissue (preclinical studies) implicate CysLTR1 antagonists as having protective/reparative effects in models of brain injury (trauma-, ischemia-, and cold-induced), multiple sclerosis, auto-immune encephalomyelitis, Alzheimer's disease, and Parkinson's disease. CysLTR1 activation is also associated in animal models with decreasing the blood–brain barrier (i.e. increasing the permeability of brain capillaries to elements of the blood's soluble elements) as well as promoting the movement of leukocytes for the blood to brain tissues; these effects may increase the development and frequency of epileptic seizure as well as the entry of leucocyte-borne viruses such as HIV-1 into brain tissue.

Increased expression of CysLTR1 has been observed in transitional cell carcinoma of the urinary bladder, neuroblastoma and other brain cancers, prostate cancer, breast cancer, and colorectal cancer (CRC); indeed, CysLTR1 tumor expression is associated with poor survival prognoses in breast cancer and CRC patients, and drug inhibitors of CysLTR1 block the in vivo and in vivo (animal model) growth of CRC cells and tumors, respectively. The pro-cancer effects of CysLTR1 in CRC appear due to its ability to up-regulate pathways that increase in CRC cell proliferation and survival.

Other cysLT receptors include cysteinyl leukotriene receptor 2 (i.e. CysLTR2) and GPR99 (also termed the oxoglutarate receptor and, sometimes, CysLTR3). The order of potency of the cysLTs in stimulating CysLTR2 is LTD4=LTC4>LTE4 with LTE4 probably lacking sufficient potency to have much activity that operates through CysLTR2 in vivo. GPR99 appears to be an important receptor for CysLTs, particularly for LTE4. The CysLTs show relative potencies of LTE4>LTC4>LTD4 in stimulating GPR99-bearing cells with GPR99-deficient mice exhibiting a dose-dependent loss of vascular permeability responses in skin to LTE4 but not to LTC4 or LTD4. This and other data suggest that GPR99 is an important receptor for the in vivo actions of LTE4 but not LTD4 or LTC4

The GPR17 receptor, also termed the uracil nucleotide/cysteinyl leukotriene receptor, was initially defined as a receptor for LTC4, LTD4, and uracil nucleotides. However, more recent studies from different laboratories could not confirm these results; they found that GPR17-bearing cells did not respond to these CysLTs or nucleotides but did find that cells expressing both CysLTR1 and GPR17 receptors exhibited a marked reduction in binding LTC4 and that mice lacking GPR17 were hyper-responsive to igE-induced passive cutaneous anaphylaxis. GPR17 therefore appears to inhibit CysLTR1, at least in these model systems. In striking contrast to these studies, studies concentration on neural tissues continue to find that Oligodendrocyte progenitor cells express GPR17 and respond through this receptor to LTC4, LTD4, and certain purines (see GPR17#Function).

The Purinergic receptor, P2Y12, while not directly binding or responding to CysLTs, appears to be activated as a consequence of activating CysLT1: blockage of P2Y12 activation either by receptor depletion or pharmacological methods inhibits many of the CysLTR1-dependent actions of CysLTs in various cell types in vitro as well as in an animal model of allergic disease.

== Ligands ==
The major CysLTs viz., LTC4, LTD4, and LTE4, are metabolites of arachidonic acid made by the 5-lipoxygenase enzyme, ALOX5, mainly by cells involved in regulating inflammation, allergy, and other immune responses such as neutrophils, eosinophils, basophils, monocytes, macrophages, mast cells, dendritic cells, and B-lymphocytes. ALOX5 metabolizes arachidonic acid to the 5,6-epoxide precursor, LTA4, which is then acted on by LTC4 synthase which attaches the γ-glutamyl-cysteinyl-glycine tripeptide (i.e. glutathione) to carbon 6 of the intermediate thereby forming LTC4 synthase. LTC4 then exits its cells of origin through the MRP1 transporter (ABCC1) and is rapidly converted to LTD4 and then to LTE4) by cell surface-attached gamma-glutamyltransferase and dipeptidase peptidase enzymes by the sequential removal of the γ-glutamyl and then glycine residues.

== Gene polymorphism ==
927T/C (nucleotide thymine replaces cytosine at position 97 of the CysLTR1 gene) gene polymorphism in the coding region of CysLTR1 has been shown to be predictive of the severity of atopy (i.e. a predisposition toward developing certain allergic hypersensitivity reactions), but not associated with asthma, in a population of 341 Caucasians in afflicted sib-pair families from the Southampton area in the United Kingdom. This atopy severity was most apparent in female siblings but the incidence of this polymorphism is extremely low and the functionality of the 927T/C gene and its product protein are as yet unknown.

The population of the small remote far South Atlantic Ocean island of Tristan da Cunha (266 permanent, genetically isolated residents) suffers a high prevalence of atopy and asthma. The CysLTR1 gene product variant, 300G/S (i.e. amino acid glycine replaces serine at the 300 position of the CysLTR1 protein), has been shown to be significantly associated with atopy in this population. The CysLTR1 300S variant exhibited significant increased sensitivity to LTD4 and LTC4 suggesting that this hypersensitivity underlies its association with atopy.

== Clinical significance ==
In spite of the other receptors cited as being responsive to CysLTs, CysLTR1 appears to be critical in mediating many of the pathological responses to CysLTs in humans. Montelukast, Zafirlukast, and Pranlukast are selective receptor antagonists for the CysLTR1 but not CysLTR2. These drugs are in use and/or shown to be effective as prophylaxis and chronic treatments for allergic and non-allergic diseases such as: allergen-induced asthma and rhinitis; aspirin-exacerbated respiratory disease; exercise- and cold-air induced asthma (see Exercise-induced bronchoconstriction); and childhood sleep apnea due to adenotonsillar hypertrophy (see Acquired non-inflammatory myopathy#Diet and Trauma Induced Myopathy). However, responses to these lukast drugs vary greatly with the drugs showing fairly high rates of poor responses and ~20% of patients reporting no change in symptoms after treatment with these agents. It seems possible that the responses of CysLTR2, GPR99, or other receptors to CysLT's may be contributing to these diseases.

== See also ==
- Eicosanoid receptor
- Cysteinyl leukotriene receptor 2
- GPR99
