= Cysteinyl leukotriene receptor 2 =

Protein-coding gene in the species Homo sapiens

CYSLTR2

Identifiers
- Aliases: CYSLTR2, CYSLT2, CYSLT2R, HG57, HPN321, KPG_011, hGPCR21, GPCR21, PSEC0146, cysteinyl leukotriene receptor 2
- External IDs: OMIM: 605666; MGI: 1917336; GeneCards: CYSLTR2

Gene location (Human)
Chr.	Chromosome 13 (human)
Band	13q14.2	Start	48,653,711 bp
Band	13q14.2	End	48,711,226 bp

Gene location (Mouse)
Chr.	Chromosome 14 (mouse)
Band	14|14 D3	Start	73,263,043 bp
Band	14|14 D3	End	73,286,554 bp
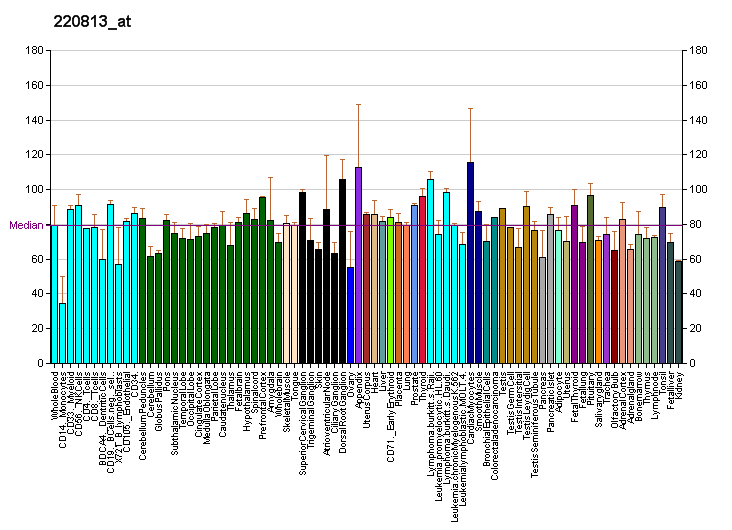
RNA expression pattern
Bgee	Human / Mouse (ortholog); Top expressed in: right adrenal cortex; monocyte; apex of heart; left adrenal cortex; granulocyte; right auricle of heart; left ventricle; lymph node; epithelium of colon; appendix / Top expressed in: secondary oocyte; zygote; thymus; lumbar spinal ganglion; morula; granulocyte; blastocyst; right kidney; esophagus; duodenum; More reference expression data
BioGPS	More reference expression data
Gene ontology
Molecular function	protein binding; G protein-coupled peptide receptor activity; signal transducer activity; G protein-coupled receptor activity; leukotriene receptor activity; cysteinyl leukotriene receptor activity; galanin receptor activity
Cellular component	integral component of plasma membrane; membrane; integral component of membrane; plasma membrane; cellular component
Biological process	positive regulation of ERK1 and ERK2 cascade; immune response; phospholipase C-activating G protein-coupled receptor signaling pathway; neuropeptide signaling pathway; leukotriene signaling pathway; signal transduction; positive regulation of cell death; positive regulation of angiogenesis; G protein-coupled receptor signaling pathway
Sources:Amigo / QuickGO
Orthologs
Databases	NCBI: entry; OMA: entry
Species	Human	Mouse
Entrez	57105	70086
Ensembl	ENSG00000152207	ENSMUSG00000033470
UniProt	Q9NS75; Q5KU17	Q920A1
RefSeq (mRNA)	NM_020377; NM_001308465; NM_001308467; NM_001308468; NM_001308469 NM_001308470; NM_001308471; NM_001308476; NM_001387012; NM_001387013; NM_001387014	NM_001162412; NM_133720
RefSeq (protein)	NP_001295394; NP_001295396; NP_001295397; NP_001295398; NP_001295399 NP_001295400; NP_001295405; NP_065110; NP_001295394.1; NP_001295396.1; NP_001295397.1; NP_001295398.1; NP_001295399.1; NP_001295400.1; NP_001295405.1	NP_001155884; NP_598481
Location (UCSC)	Chr 13: 48.65 – 48.71 Mb	Chr 14: 73.26 – 73.29 Mb
PubMed search
- Wikidata
View/Edit Human	View/Edit Mouse

Cysteinyl leukotriene receptor 2, also termed CYSLTR2, is a receptor for cysteinyl leukotrienes (LT) (see leukotrienes#Cysteinyl leukotrienes). CYSLTR2, by binding these cysteinyl LTs (CysLTs; viz, LTC4, LTD4, and to a much lesser extent, LTE4) contributes to mediating various allergic and hypersensitivity reactions in humans. However, the first discovered receptor for these CsLTs, cysteinyl leukotriene receptor 1 (CysLTR1), appears to play the major role in mediating these reactions.

== Gene ==
The human CysLTR2 gene maps to the long arm of chromosome 13 at position 13q14, a chromosomal region that has long been linked to asthma and other allergic diseases. The gene consists of four exons with all introns located in the genes' 5' UTR region and the entire coding region located in the last exon. 'CysLTR2 encodes a protein composed of 347 amino acids and shows only modest similarity to the CysLTR1 gene in that its protein shares only 31% amino acid identity with the CysLTR1 protein.

== Receptor ==
CySLTR2 mRNA is co-expressed along with CysLRR1 in human blood eosinophils and platelets, and tissue mast cells, macrophages, airway epithelial cells, and vascular endothelial cells. It is also expressed without CysLTR1 throughout the heart, including Purkinje cells, adrenal gland, and brain as well as some vascular endothelial, airway epithelial, and smooth muscle cells.

CysLTR2, similar to CysLTR1, is a G protein–coupled receptor that links to and when bound to its CysLT ligands activates the Gq alpha subunit and/or Ga subunit of its coupled G protein, depending or the cell type. Acting through these G proteins and their subunits, ligand-bound CysLTR1 activates a series of pathways that lead to cell function (see Gq alpha subunit#function and Ga subunit#function for details); the order of potency of the cysLTs in stimulating CysLTR2 is LTD4=LTC4>LTE4 with LTE4 probably lacking sufficient potency to have much activity that operates through CysLTR1 in vivo. By comparison, the stimulating potencies of these CysLTs for CysLTR1 is LTD4>LTC4>LTE4 with LTD4 showing 10-fold greater potency on CysLTR1 than CysLTR2. Perhaps related to this difference in CysLT sensitivities, cells co-expressing CysLTR2 and CysLTR1 may exhibit lower sensitivity to LTD4 than do cells expressing only CysLTR1; in consequence, CysLTR2 has been suggested to dampen CysLTR1's activities.

In addition to CysLTR1, GPR99 (also termed the oxoglutarate receptor or, sometimes, CysLTR3) appears to be an important receptor for CysLTs, particularly for LTE4: the CystLTs show relative potencies of LTE4>LTC4>LTD4 in stimulating GPR99-bearing cells and GPR99-deficient mice exhibit a dose-dependent loss of vascular permeability responses in skin to LTE4 but not to LTC4 or LTD4.

Other studies on model cells for allergy have defined GPR17 (also termed the uracil nucleotide/cysteinyl leukotriene receptor) as a receptor not only uracil nucleotides but also for CysLTs, with CysLTs having the following potencies LTD4>LTC4>LTE4 in stimulating GPR17-bearing cells. However, recent studies also working with model cells involved in allergy find that GPR17-bearing cells do not respond to these CysLTs (or uracil nucleotides). Rather, they find that: a) cells expressing both CysLTR1 and GPR17 receptors exhibit a marked reduction in binding and responding to LTD4 and b) mice lacking GPR17 are hyper-responsive to igE in a model for passive cutaneous anaphylaxis. The latter studies conclude that GPR17 acts to inhibit CysLTR1. Finally, and in striking contrast to these studies, repeated studies on neural tissues find that Oligodendrocyte progenitor cells express GPR17 and respond through this receptor to LTC4, LTD4, and certain purines (see GPR17#Function).

== CysLTR2 inhibitors ==
There are as yet no selective inhibitors of CysLTR2 that are in clinical use (see Clinical significance section below). However, Gemilukast (ONO-6950) reportedly inhibits both CysLTR1 and CysLTR2. The drug is currently being evaluated in phase II trials for the treatment of asthma.

== CysLTR2 polymorphism ==
Polymorphism in the CysLTR2 gene resulting in a single amino acid substitution, M201V (i.e. amino acid methionine changed for valine at the 201 position of CysLTR2 protein) has been negatively associated in Transmission disequilibrium testing with the inheritance of asthma in separate populations of: a) white and African-Americans from 359 families with a high prevalence of asthma in Denmark and Minnesota, USA, and b) 384 families with a high prevalence of asthma from the Genetics of Asthma International Network. The M201V CysLTR2 variant exhibits decreased responsiveness to LTD4 suggesting that this hypo-responsiveness underlies its asthma transmission-protecting effect. A -1220A>C (i.e. nucleotide adenine substituted for cytosine at position 1220 upstream from the transcription start site) gene polymorphism variant in intron III the upstream region of CysLTR2 has been associated significantly with development of asthma in a Japanese population; the impact of this polymorphism on the genes expression or product has not been determined. These results suggest that CYSLTR2 contributes to the etiology and development asthma and that drugs targeting CYSLTR2 may work in a manner that differs from those of CYSLTR1 antagonists.

== Clinical significance ==
The CysLT-induced activation of CysLTR2 induces many of the same in vitro responses of cells involved in allergic reactions as well as the in vivo allergic responses in animal models as that induced by CysLT-induced CysLTR1 (see Cysteinyl leukotriene receptor 1#Receptor. However, CysLT2 requires 10-fold higher concentrations of LTD4, the most potent cysLT for CysLTR1, to activate CysLTR2. Furthermore, the allergic and hypersensitivity responses of humans and animal models are significantly reduced by chronic treatment with Montelukast, Zafirlukast, and Pranlukast, drugs which are selective receptor antagonists of CysLTR1 but not CysLTR2. Models of allergic reactions in Cysltr2-deficient mice as well as in a human mast cell line indicate that mouse Cysltr2 and its human homolog CysLTR2 act to inhibit Cysltr1 and CysLTR1, respectively, and therefore suggest that CysLTR2 may similarly inhibit CysLTR1 in human allergic diseases. The role of CysLTR2 in the allergic and hypersensitivity diseases of humans must await the development of selective CysLTR2 inhibitors.

== See also ==
- Cysteinyl leukotriene receptor 1
- Eicosanoid receptor
- GPR99
