= OXGR1 =

Protein-coding gene in the species Homo sapiens

Identifiers
- Aliases: OXGR1, GPR80, GPR99, P2RY15, P2Y15, aKGR, oxoglutarate receptor 1
- External IDs: OMIM: 606922; MGI: 2685145; GeneCards: OXGR1

Gene location (Human)
Chr.	Chromosome 13 (human)
Band	13q32.1	Start	96,985,713 bp
Band	13q32.1	End	96,994,730 bp

Gene location (Mouse)
Chr.	Chromosome 14 (mouse)
Band	14|14 E4	Start	120,256,997 bp
Band	14|14 E4	End	120,279,847 bp
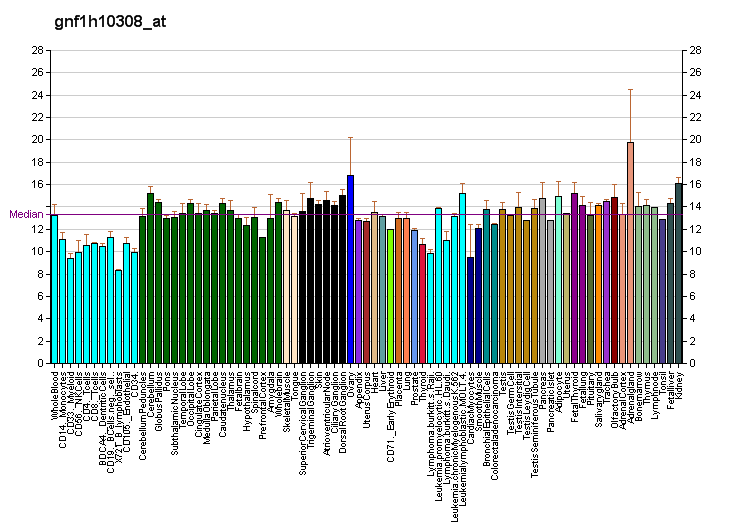
RNA expression pattern
Bgee	Human / Mouse (ortholog); Top expressed in: islet of Langerhans; Achilles tendon; minor salivary glands; olfactory zone of nasal mucosa; rectum; human kidney; skin of leg; appendix; right uterine tube; skin of abdomen / Top expressed in: right kidney; human kidney; lumbar subsegment of spinal cord; spermatocyte; spermatid; renal cortex; extraocular muscle; lumbar spinal ganglion; metanephros; central gray substance of midbrain; More reference expression data
BioGPS	More reference expression data
Gene ontology
Molecular function	G protein-coupled receptor activity; signal transducer activity
Cellular component	integral component of membrane; membrane; plasma membrane
Biological process	G protein-coupled receptor signaling pathway; signal transduction
Sources:Amigo / QuickGO
Orthologs
Databases	NCBI: entry; OMA: entry
Species	Human	Mouse
Entrez	27199	239283
Ensembl	ENSG00000165621	ENSMUSG00000044819
UniProt	Q96P68	Q6IYF8
RefSeq (mRNA)	NM_080818; NM_001346194; NM_001346195; NM_001346196; NM_001346197	NM_001001490
RefSeq (protein)	NP_001333123; NP_001333124; NP_001333125; NP_001333126; NP_543008	NP_001001490
Location (UCSC)	Chr 13: 96.99 – 96.99 Mb	Chr 14: 120.26 – 120.28 Mb
PubMed search
- Wikidata
View/Edit Human	View/Edit Mouse

OXGR1, i.e., 2-oxoglutarate receptor 1 (also known as GPR99, cysteinyl leukotriene receptor E, i.e., CysLT_{E}, and cysteinyl leukotriene receptor 3, i.e., CysLT3) is a G protein-coupled receptor located on the surface membranes of certain cells. It functions by binding one of its ligands and thereby becoming active in triggering pre-programmed responses in its parent cells. OXGR1 has been shown to be activated by α-ketoglutarate, itaconate, and three cysteinyl-containing leukotrienes (abbreviated as CysLTs), leukotriene E4 (i.e., LTE4), LTC4, and LTD4. α-Ketoglutarate and itaconate are the dianionic forms of α-ketoglutaric acid and itaconic acid, respectively. α-Ketoglutaric and itaconic acids are short-chain dicarboxylic acids that have two carboxyl groups (notated as -CO_{2}H) both of which are bound to hydrogen (i.e., H^{+}). However, at the basic pH levels (i.e., pH>7) in virtually all animal tissues, α-ketoglutaric acid and itaconic acid exit almost exclusively as α-ketoglutarate and itaconate, i.e., with their carboxy residues being negatively charged (notated as -CO_{2}$^{-}$), because they are not bound to H^{+} (see Conjugate acid-base theory). It is α-ketoglutarate and itaconate, not α-ketoglutaric or itaconic acids, which activate OXGR1.

== History ==
In 2001, a human gene projected to code for a G protein-coupled receptor (i.e., a receptor that stimulates cells by activating G proteins) was identified. Its protein product was classified as an orphan receptor, i.e., a receptor whose activating ligand and function are unknown. The projected amino acid sequence of the protein encoded by this gene bore similarities to the purinergic receptor, P2Y1, and therefore might, like P2Y1, be a receptor for purines. This study named the new receptor and its gene GPR80 and GPR80, respectively. Shortly thereafter, a second study found this same gene, indicated that it coded for a G protein-coupled receptor, had an amino acid sequence similar to two purinergic receptors, P2Y1 and GPR91, and determined that a large series of purine nucleotides, other nucleotides, and derivatives of these compounds did not activate this receptor. The study named this receptor GPR99. A third study published in 2004 reported an orphan G protein-coupled receptor with an amino acid sequence similar to the P2Y receptor family of nucleotides was activated by two purines, adenosine and adenosine monophosphate. The study nominated this receptor to be a purinergic receptor and named it the P2Y15 receptor. However, a review in 2004 of these three studies by members of the International Union of Pharmacology Subcommittee for P2Y Receptor Nomenclature and Classification decided that GPR80/GPR99 is not a receptor for adenosine, adenosine monophosphate, or any other nucleotide. A fourth study, also published in 2004, found that GPR80/GPR99 -bearing cells responded to α-ketoglutarate. In 2013, IUPHAR accepted this report and the names OXGR1 and OXGR1 for the α-ketoglutarate responsive receptor and its gene, respectively. In 2013, a fifth study found that LTE4, LTC4, and LTD4 activated OXGR1. Finally, a 2023 study provided evidence that itaconate also activated OXGR1.

== OXGR1 gene ==
The human OXGR1 gene is located on chromosome 13 at position 13q32.2; that is, it resides at position 32.2 (i.e., region 3, band 2, sub-band 2) on the "q" arm (i.e., long arm) of chromosome 13. OXGR1 codes for a G protein coupled-receptor that is primarily linked to and activates heterotrimeric G proteins containing the Gq alpha subunit. When bound to one of its ligands, OXGR1 activates Gq alpha subunit-regulated cellular pathways (see Functions of the Gq alpha pathways) that stimulate the cellular responses that these pathways are programmed to elicit.

== OXGR1 activating and inhibiting ligands ==
=== Activating ligands ===
OXGR1 is the receptor for α-ketoglutarate, LTE4, LTC4, LTD4, and itaconate. These ligands have the following relative potencies in stimulating responses in cultures of cells expressing human OXGR1:

LTE4 >> LTC4 = LTD4 > α-ketoglutarate = itaconate

LTE4 is able to stimulate responses in at least some of its target cells at concentrations as low as a few picomoles/liter whereas LTC4, LTD4, α-ketoglutarate, and itaconate require far higher levels to do so.

The relative potencies that LTC4, LTD4, and LTE4 have in activating their target receptors, i.e., cysteinyl leukotriene receptor 1 (CysLTR1), cysteinyl leukotriene receptor 2 (CysLTR2), and OXGR1 are:

CysLTR1: LTD4 > LTC4 >> LTE4
CysLTR2: LTC4 = LTD4 >> LTE4
OXGR1: LTE4 > LTC4 > LTD4

These relationships suggest that CysTR1 and CysLTR2 are physiological receptors for LTD4 and LTC4 but due to its relative weakness in stimulating these two receptors, perhaps not or to a far lesser extent for LTE4. Indeed, the LTE4 concentrations needed to activate CysTR1 and CysLTR2 may be higher than those that normally occur in vivo (see Functions of OXGR1 in mediating the actions of LTE4, LTD4, and LTC4). These potency relationships suggest that the LTE4's actions are mediated primarily by OXGR1. The following findings support this suggestion. First, pretreatment of guinea pig trachea and human bronchial smooth muscle with LTE4 but not with LTC4 or LTD4 enhanced their smooth muscle contraction responses to histamine. This suggests LTE4's target receptor differs from the receptors targeted by LTC4 and LTD4. Second, LTE4 was as potent as LTC4 and LTD4 in eliciting vascular leakage when injected into the skin of guinea pigs and humans; the inhalation of LTE4 by asthmatic individuals caused the accumulation of eosinophils and basophils in their bronchial mucosa whereas the inhalation of LTD4 did not have this effect; and mice engineered to lack CysLTR1 and CysLTR2 receptors exhibited edema responses to the intradermal injection of LTC4, LTD4, and LTE4 but LTE4 was 64-fold more potent in triggering this response in these mice than in wild type mice. Since LTE4 should have been far less active than LTC4 or LTD4 in triggering vascular leakage, the recruitment of the cited cells into the lung, and causing vascular edema responses in mice lacking CysLT1 and CysLT2 receptors, these findings imply that the latter two receptors are not the primary receptors mediating LTF4' actions. And third, mice engineered to lack all three CysLTR1, CysLTR2, and OXGR1 receptors did not exhibit dermal edema responses to the injection of LTC4, LTD4, or LTE4 thereby indicating that at least one of these receptors was responsible for each of their actions. Overall, these findings suggest that LTE4 commonly acts through a different receptor than LTC4 and LTD4 and that this receptor is OXGR1. Indeed, studies have defined OXGR1 as the high affinity receptor for LTF4. Nonetheless, several studies have reported that cultures of certain types of inflammatory cells, e.g., the human LAD2 (but not LUVA) mast cell lines, T helper cell lymphocytes that have differentiated into T_{h}2 cells, and mouse ILC2 lymphocytes (also termed type 2 innate lymphoid cells) The levels of LTE4 used in some of these studies may not develop in animals or humans. In all events, dysfunctions caused by deleting the OXGR1 gene in cells, tissues or animals and dysfunctions in humans that are associated with a lack of a viable OXGR1 gene implicate the lack of OXGR1 protein in the development of these dysfunctions.

=== Inhibiting ligand ===
OXGR1 is inhibited by Montelukast, a well-known and clinically useful receptor antagonist, i.e., inhibitor, of CysLTR1 but not CysTR2 activation. (Inhibitors of CysLTR2 have not been identified.) In consequence, Montelukast blocks the binding and thereby the actions of LTE4, LTC4, and LTD4 that are mediated by OXGR1. It is presumed to act similarly to block the actions of α-ketoglutarate and itaconate on OXGR1. It is not yet known if other CysLTR1 inhibitors can mimic Montelukast in blocking OXGR1's responses to α-ketoglutarate and itaconate. Montelukast is used to treat various disorders including asthma, exercise-induced bronchoconstriction, allergic rhinitis, primary dysmenorrhea (i.e. menstrual cramps not associated with known causes, see causes of dysmenorrhea), and urticaria (see Functions of CysLTR1). While it is likely that its inhibition of CysLTR1 accounts for its effects in these diseases, the ability of these leukotrienes, particularly LTE4, to stimulate OXGR1 allows that Montelukast's effects on these conditions may be due at least in part to its ability to block OXGR1.

== Expression ==
Based on their content of the OXGR1 protein or mRNA that directs its synthesis, OXGR1 is expressed in human: a) kidney, placenta, and fetal brain; b) cells that promote allergic and other hypersensitivity reactions, i.e., eosinophils and mast cells; c) tissues involved in allergic and other hypersensitivity reactions such as the lung trachea, salivary glands, and nasal mucosa; and d) fibroblasts, i.e., cells that synthesize the extracellular matrix and collagen (when pathologically activated, these cells produce tissue fibrosis). In mice, Oxgr1 mRNA is highly expressed in kidneys, testes, smooth muscle tissues, nasal epithelial cells, and lung epithelial cells.

== Functions ==
=== Associated with OXGR1 gene defects or deficiencies ===
The following studies have defined OXGR1 functions based on the presence of disorders in mice or humans that do not have a viable OXGR1 protein. It is not been determined which of OXGR1's ligands, if any, are responsible for stimulating OXGR1 to prevent these disorders.

==== Otitis media ====
Mice lacking OXGPR1 protein due the knockout of their OXGR1 gene developed (82% penetrance) otitis media (i.e., inflammation in their middle ears), mucus effusions in their middle ears, and hearing losses all which had many characteristics of human otitis media. The study did not find evidence that these mice had a middle ear bacterial infection. (Infection with Streptococcus pneumoniae, Moraxella catarrhalis, or other bacteria is one of the most common causes of otitis media.) While the underlying mechanism for the development of this otitis has not been well-defined, the study suggests that OXER1 functions to prevent middle ear inflammations and Oxgr1 gene knockout mice may be a good model to study and relate to human ear pathophysiology.

==== Goblet cells ====
Mice lacking OXGR1 protein due the knockout of their OXGR1 gene had significantly fewer numbers of mucin-containing goblet cells in their nasal mucosa than control mice. Cysltr1 gene knockout mice and Cysltr2 gene knockout mice had normal numbers of these nasal goblet cells. This finding implicates OXGR1 in functioning to maintain higher numbers of airway goblet cells.

==== Kidney stones and nephrocalcinosis ====
Majmunda et al. identified 6 individuals from different families with members that had histories of developing calcium-containing kidney stones (also termed nephrolithiasis) and/or nephrocalcinosis (i.e., the deposition of calcium-containing material in multiple sites throughout the kidney). Each of these 6 individuals had dominant variants in their OXGR1 gene. These variant genes appeared (based on their OXGR1 gene's DNA structure as defined by exome sequencing) to be unable to form an active OXGR1 protein. The study proposed that the OXGR1 gene is a candidate for functioning to suppress the development of calcium-containing nephrolithiasis and nephrocalcinosis in humans.

=== Associated with α-ketoglutarate-regulated functions ===
Studies in rodents have found that the ability of α-ketoglutarate to regulate various functions is dependent on its activation of OXGR1 (see OXGR1 receptor-dependent bioactions of α-ketoglutarate). These functions include: promoting normal kidney functions such as the absorption of key urinary ions and maintenance of acid base balance; regulating the development of glucose tolerance as defined by glucose tolerance tests; suppressing the development of diet-induced obesity; and suppressing the muscle atrophy response to excessive exercise.

=== Associated with LTE4-induced functions ===
A study showed that LTE4, LTC4, and LTD4 produce similar levels of vascular leakage and localized tissue swelling when injected into the skin of guinea pigs or humans. Studies that examined the effects of using various doses of these LTs after injection into the earlobes of mice found that, in comparison to control mice, OXGR1 gene knockout mice showed virtually no response to injection of a low dose of LTE4, a greatly reduced response to injection of an intermediate dose of LTE4, and a somewhat delayed but otherwise similar response to a high dose of LTE4 (these doses were 0.008, 0.0625, and 0.5 nmols, respectively). The study concluded that lower levels of LTE4 act primarily through OXGR1 to cause vascular permeability and, since it is the major cysteinyl leukotriene that accumulates in inflamed tissues, suggested that OXGR1 may be a therapeutic target for treating inflammatory disorders. Another study found that the application of an extract of Alternaria alternata (a genus of fungi that infects plants and causes allergic diseases, infections, and toxic reactions in animals and humans) into the noses of mice caused their nasal epithelial cells to release mucin and their nasal submucosa to swell. (The nasal as well as lung epithelial cells of these mice expressed OXGR1). OXGR1 gene knockout mice did not show these responses to the fungal toxin. The study also showed that a) Cysltr1 and Cysltr2 double gene knockout mice had full mucin release response to the toxin and b) Cstlr2 gene knockout mice had full submucosal swelling responses to the toxin but Csltr1 gene knockout mice did not show submucosal swelling responses to the toxin. The study concluded that LTE4's activation of OXGR1 controls key airway epithelial cell functions in mice and suggested that the inhibition of LTE4-induced OXGR1 activation may prove useful for treating asthma and other allergic and inflammatory disorders. A subsequent study examined the effects of LTE4-OXGR1 on a certain type of tuft cell. When located in intestinal mucosa, these tuft cells are termed tuft cells but when located in the nasal respiratory mucosa they are termed solitary chemosensory cells and when located in the trachea they are termed brush cells. Control mice that inhaled the mold Alternaria alternata, the American house dust mite Dermatophagoides farinae, or LTF4 developed increases in the number of their tracheal brush cells, release of the inflammation-promoting cytokine, interleukin 25, and lung inflammation whereas OXGR1 gene knockout mice did not show these responses. These findings indicate that the activation of OXGR1 regulates airway: brush cell numbers, interleukin 25 release, and inflammation.

=== Associated with itaconate-regulated functions ===
A study reported in 2023 was the first and to date (2024) only study indicating that itaconate's actions are mediated by activating OXGR1. This study showed that itaconate stimulated the nasal secretion of mucus when applied to the noses of mice, reduced the number of Pseudomonas aeruginosa bacteria in their lung tissue and bronchoalveolar lavage fluid (i.e., airway washing) in mice injected intranasally with these bacteria, and stimulated cultured mouse respiratory epithelium cells to raise their cytosolic Ca^{2+} levels (an indicator of cell activation). Itaconate was unable to induce these responses in OXGR1 gene knockout mice or in the respiratory epithelial cells isolated from the OXGR1 gene knockout mice. The study concluded that the activation of OXGR1 by itaconate contributes to regulating the pulmonary innate immune response to Pseudomonas aeruginosa and might also do so in other bacterial infections.
