= GPR17 =

Protein-coding gene in the species Homo sapiens

Identifiers
- Aliases: GPR17, G protein-coupled receptor 17
- External IDs: OMIM: 603071; MGI: 3584514; GeneCards: GPR17

Gene location (Human)
Chr.	Chromosome 2 (human)
Band	2q14.3	Start	127,645,864 bp
Band	2q14.3	End	127,652,639 bp

Gene location (Mouse)
Chr.	Chromosome 18 (mouse)
Band	18 B1|18	Start	32,076,050 bp
Band	18 B1|18	End	32,082,689 bp
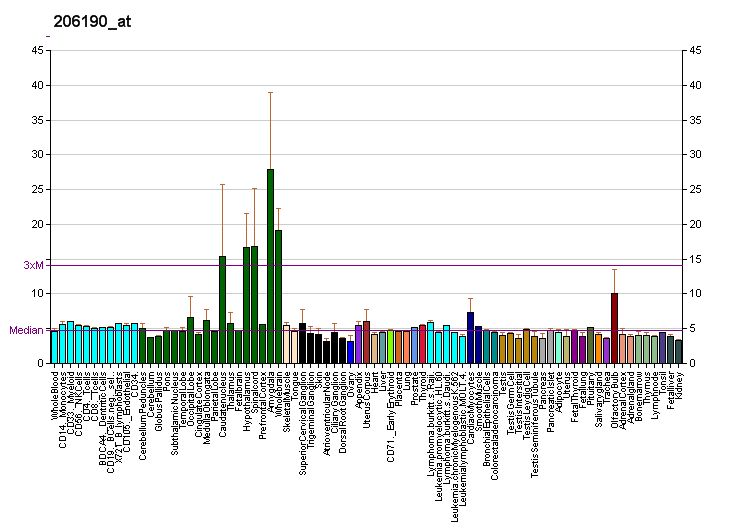

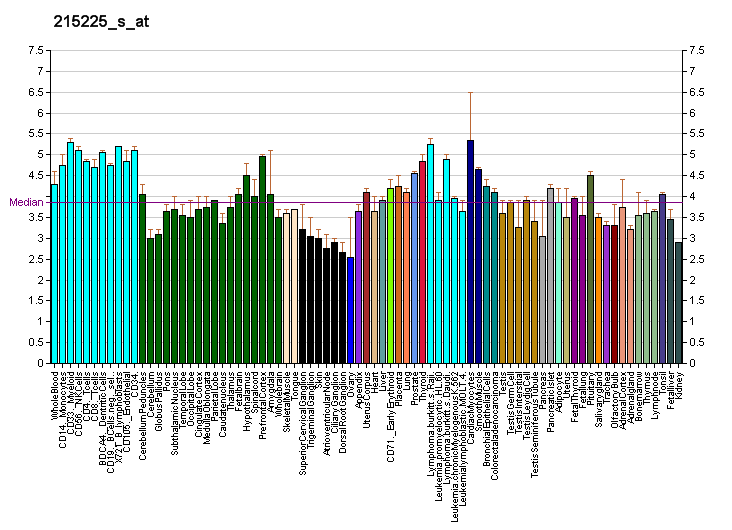
RNA expression pattern
Bgee	Human / Mouse (ortholog); Top expressed in: apex of heart; sural nerve; gastric mucosa; muscle layer of sigmoid colon; amygdala; right auricle of heart; body of uterus; left coronary artery; left ventricle; Descending thoracic aorta / Top expressed in: lumbar subsegment of spinal cord; dentate gyrus of hippocampal formation granule cell; Rostral migratory stream; nucleus of stria terminalis; visual cortex; central gray substance of midbrain; anterior horn of spinal cord; temporal lobe; primary visual cortex; hippocampus proper; More reference expression data
BioGPS	More reference expression data
Gene ontology
Molecular function	G protein-coupled receptor activity; chemokine receptor activity; signal transducer activity; receptor serine/threonine kinase binding
Cellular component	integral component of membrane; plasma membrane; integral component of plasma membrane; membrane
Biological process	G protein-coupled receptor signaling pathway; signal transduction; negative regulation of inflammatory response to antigenic stimulus; chemokine-mediated signaling pathway; immune system process; positive regulation of Rho protein signal transduction; positive regulation of cytosolic calcium ion concentration involved in phospholipase C-activating G protein-coupled signaling pathway; oligodendrocyte differentiation
Sources:Amigo / QuickGO
Orthologs
Databases	NCBI: entry; OMA: entry
Species	Human	Mouse
Entrez	2840	574402
Ensembl	ENSG00000144230	ENSMUSG00000052229
UniProt	Q13304	Q6NS65
RefSeq (mRNA)	NM_005291; NM_001161415; NM_001161416; NM_001161417	NM_001025381
RefSeq (protein)	NP_001154887; NP_001154888; NP_001154889; NP_005282	NP_001020552
Location (UCSC)	Chr 2: 127.65 – 127.65 Mb	Chr 18: 32.08 – 32.08 Mb
PubMed search
- Wikidata
View/Edit Human	View/Edit Mouse

Uracil nucleotide/cysteinyl leukotriene receptor is a G protein-coupled receptor that in humans is encoded by the GPR17 gene located on chromosome 2 at position q21. The actual activating ligands for and some functions of this receptor are disputed.

== History ==
Initially discovered in 1998 as an Orphan receptor, i.e. a receptor whose activating ligand(s) and function were unknown, GPR17 was "deorphanized" in a study that reported it to be a receptor for LTC4, LTD4, and uracil nucleotides. In consequence, GPR17 attracted attention as a potential mediator of reactions caused by LTC4 and LTD4 viz., asthma, rhinitis, and urticarial triggered by allergens, nonsteroidal anti-inflammatory drugs, and exercise (see Aspirin-induced asthma). Subsequent reports, however, have varied in results: studies focusing on the allergen and non-allergen reactions find that GPR17-bearing cells do not respond to LTC4, LTD4, and uracil nucleotides while studies focusing on nerve tissue find that certain types of GPR17-bearing oligodendrocytes do indeed respond to them. In 2013 and 2014 reports, the International Union of Basic and Clinical Pharmacology took no position on which of these are true ligands for GPR17. GPR17 is a constitutively active receptor, i.e. a receptor that has baseline activity which is independent of, although potentially increased by, its ligands.

== Biochemistry ==
GPR17 has a structure which is intermediate between the cysteinyl leukotriene receptor group (i.e. cysteinyl leukotriene receptor 1 and cysteinyl leukotriene receptor 2) and the purine P2Y subfamily of 12 receptors (see P2Y receptors), sharing 28 to 48% amino acid identity with them. GPR17 is a G protein coupled receptor that acts primarily through G proteins linked to the Gi alpha subunit but also to Gq alpha subunit. Matching these structural relationships, GPR17 has been reported to be activated by cysteinyl leukotrienes (i.e. LTC4 and LTD4) as well as the purines (i.e., uridine, Uridine diphosphate (UDP), UDP-glucose). Further relating these receptors, GPR17 may dimerize (i.e. associate with) certain of the cited cysteinyl leukotriene or purine receptors in mediating cell responses and this dimerization may explain some of the discrepancies reported for the ability of these ligands to activate GPR17 as expressed in different cell types (see below section of Function). GPR17 is also activated by the emergency-signaling and atherosclerosis-promoting oxysterols and by synthetic compounds with broadly different structures. Relevant to its activating ligands as well as its reported interaction with other G protein coupled receptors, GPR17 is a promiscuous receptor.

Montelukast which inhibits cysteinyl leukotriene receptor 1 and is in clinical use for the chronic and preventative treatment of LTC4- and LTD4-promoted allergic and non-allergic diseases, and Cangrelor, which inhibits P2Y purinergic receptors and is approved in the USA as an antiplatelet drug, inhibit the GPR17 receptor.

== Distribution ==
GPR17 was first clone form and is highly expressed in certain precursors of oligodendrocytes in the nerve tissue of the central nervous system (CNS); it is overexpress in CNS tissues experiencing demyelination injuries; within 48 hours of the latter types of injuries, GPR17 expression is induced in dying neurons within and on the borders of injury, in infiltrating microglia and macrophages, and in activated oligodendrocyte precursor cells.

== Function ==
Studies focusing on allergic and hypersensitivity reactions have found that the LTC4 and LTD4 ligands for Cysteinyl leukotriene receptor 1 (CysLTR1) and Cysteinyl leukotriene receptor 2, which mediate these reactions, have disputed findings that LTC4 and LTD4 are ligands for GPR17. They have shown that cells co-expressing both CysLTR1 and GPR17 receptors exhibit a marked reduction in binding LTC4 and that mice lacking GPR17 are hyper-responsive to IgE-induced passive cutaneous anaphylaxis. They therefore have nominated GPR17 as functioning to inhibit CysLTR1 in these model systems and as such might serve to dampen the acute reactions involving the cited LTs.

Studies focusing on nerve tissue indicate that GPR17 is: a) highly expressed in precursors to mature oligodendrocytes but not expressed in mature oligodendrocytes, suggesting that GPR17 must be down-regulated in order for precursor cells to proceed to terminal oligodendrocyte differentiation; b) activated by uridine, Uridine diphosphate (UDP) and UDP-glucose to stimulate outward K+ channels and the aforementioned maturation responses in oligodendrocyte precursor cells; c) also activated by LTC4 and LTD4; d) more highly expressed in central nervous system (CNS) tissues of animal models undergoing ischemia, Experimental autoimmune encephalomyelitis, and focal demyelination as well as in the CNS tissues of humans suffering brain damage due to ischemia, trauma, and multiple sclerosis; e) expressed in injured neurons and associated with the rapid death and clearance of these neurons in a model of mouse spinal cord crush injury; f) acts to reduce the extent of spinal cord injury in the latter model based on the increased extent of injury in GPR17-depleted mice; and g) acts to reduce inflammation, elevate hippocampus neurogenesis, and improve learning and memory in a rat model of age-related cognitive impairment based on the effects of the GPR17 antagonist, montelukast, as well as of GPR17 depletion. The studies suggest that GPR17 is a sensor of damage in the CNS and participates in the resolution of this damage by clearing and/or promoting the re-myelination of injured neurons caused by a variety of insults perhaps including old age.

The GPR17 gene has also been found to regulate food intake response mediated by FOXO1.

== Clinical significance ==
GPR17 has been proposed as a potential pharmacological target for the treatment of multiple sclerosis and traumatic brain injury in humans.
