= Pranlukast =

Chemical compound

Clinical data
- Trade names: Onon (オノン)
- AHFS/Drugs.com: International Drug Names
- Routes of administration: Oral
- ATC code: R03DC02 (WHO)

Pharmacokinetic data
- Metabolism: Hepatic (mainly CYP3A4)
- Elimination half-life: 1.5 hours

Identifiers
- IUPAC name: N-[4-oxo-2-(1H-tetrazol-5-yl)-4H-chromen-8-yl]-4-(4-phenylbutoxy)benzamide
- CAS Number: 103177-37-3
- PubChem CID: 4887
- IUPHAR/BPS: 3634
- DrugBank: DB01411
- ChemSpider: 4718
- UNII: TB8Z891092
- ChEMBL: ChEMBL21333
- CompTox Dashboard (EPA): DTXSID3043782
- ECHA InfoCard: 100.236.084

Chemical and physical data
- Formula: C_{27}H_{23}N_{5}O_{4}
- Molar mass: 481.512 g·mol^{−1}
- 3D model (JSmol): Interactive image
- SMILES: O=C(Nc2cccc3c(=O)cc(c1nn[nH]n1)oc23)c5ccc(OCCCCc4ccccc4)cc5
- InChI: InChI=1S/C27H23N5O4/c33-23-17-24(26-29-31-32-30-26)36-25-21(23)10-6-11-22(25)28-27(34)19-12-14-20(15-13-19)35-16-5-4-9-18-7-2-1-3-8-18/h1-3,6-8,10-15,17H,4-5,9,16H2,(H,28,34)(H,29,30,31,32); Key:NBQKINXMPLXUET-UHFFFAOYSA-N

Pranlukast (brand name Onon, オノン) is a cysteinyl leukotriene receptor-1 antagonist. This drug works similarly to Merck & Co.'s montelukast (Singulair). It is widely used in Japan.

Medications of this class, which go under a variety of names according to whether one looks at the American, British or European system of nomenclature, have as their primary function the antagonism of bronchospasm caused, principally in asthmatics, by an allergic reaction to accidentally or inadvertently encountered allergens.

Medications of this group are normally used as an adjunct to the standard therapy of inhaled steroids with inhaled long- and/or short-acting beta-agonists. There are several similar medications in the group; all appear to be equally effective. Pranlukast is also reported as potential inhibitor of Mycobacterium tuberculosis infection in experimental models.
