= Cyclopentenone prostaglandins =

Prostaglandin subset

Cyclopentenone prostaglandins are a subset of prostaglandins (PGs) or prostanoids (see Eicosanoid §§ Classic eicosanoids and Nonclassic eicosanoids) that has 15-deoxy-Δ12,14-prostaglandin J2 (15-d-Δ12,14-PGJ2), Δ12-PGJ2, and PGJ2 as its most prominent members but also including PGA2, PGA1, and, while not classified as such, other PGs. 15-d-Δ12,14-PGJ2, Δ12-PGJ2, and PGJ2 share a common mono-unsaturated cyclopentenone structure as well as a set of similar biological activities including the ability to suppress inflammation responses and the growth as well as survival of cells, particularly those of cancerous or neurological origin. Consequently, these three cyclopentenone-PGs and the two epoxyisoprostanes are suggested to be models for the development of novel anti-inflammatory and anti-cancer drugs. The cyclopenentone prostaglandins are structurally and functionally related to a subset of isoprostanes viz., two cyclopentenone isoprostanes, 5,6-epoxyisoprostane E2 and 5,6-epoxisoprostane A2.

== Biochemistry ==
In cells, COX-1 and COX-2 metabolize arachidonic acid to PGH2 which is then converted to PGE2 by any one of three isozymes, PTGES, PTGES2, and PTGES3 or, alternatively, to PGD2 by either of two enzymes, a glutathione-independent synthase termed lipocalin-type Prostaglandin D2 synthase (PTGDS or L-PGDS) and a glutathione-dependent hematopoietic prostaglandin D synthase or HPGDS; the COX's also metabolizes dihomo-gamma-linolenic acid to PGH1 which is metabolized by one of the three PTGES isoenzymes to PGE1 (see Eicosanoid § Prostanoid pathways). PGE2, PGE1, and PGD2 undergo a dehydration reaction PGA2, PGA1, and PGJ2, respectively. PGD2 conversions form the most studied cyclopentenone PGs. These conversions are as follows:

- PGD2 is a 20 carbon arachidonic acid metabolite with double bonds between carbons 5,6 and 13,14, a carbon-carbon bond between carbons 8 and 12 (which establishes its cyclopentanone ring), hydroxyl residues attached to carbons 9 and 15, and a ketol residue (i.e. oxygen double bonded to carbon) attached to carbon 11. PGD2 undergoes a spontaneous (i.e. non-enzymatic) dehydration reaction (i.e. removal of two hydrogen atoms and one oxygen atom [i.e. H_{2}O]) across its 9-hydroxyl-carbon 10 region to form a new 9,10 double bond to become PGJ2 possessing a cyclopentenone ring (i.e. the ring contains one double bond) replacing the cyclopentanone ring (i.e. the ring has no double bonds) of PGD2. Carbon 9 thereby becomes chemically reactive as an electrophilic center.
- PGJ2 undergoes a spontaneous isomerization reaction in which the carbon 13,14 double bound shifts to the carbon 12,13 position to become Δ12-PGJ2 with a second electrophilic center site established at carbon 13.
- Δ12-PGJ2 undergoes a spontaneous dehydration reaction across its 15-hydroxyl-carbon 14 region to form a new double bound between carbons 14 and 15 thereby becoming 15-deoxy-Δ12,14-PGJ2 with retained electrophilic sites at carbons 9 and 13. Carbon 9 is more electrophilic than carbon 13 and therefore is more active than carbon 9 in forming covalent bonds with other molecules.

PGE2 and PGE1 are 20 carbon metabolites of arachidonic acid and dihomo-γ-linolenic acid, respectively, with a double bond between carbons 13 and 14, a carbon-carbon bond between carbons 8 and 12 (which establishes their cyclopentanone structure), hydroxyl residues at carbons 11 and 15, and a ketol residue at carbon 9. They differ in that PGE2 has, while PGE1 lacks, a double bound between carbons 5 and 6. Both PGs undergo a dehydration reaction across their 11-hydroxyl-carbon 10 regions to form a new double bond between carbons 10 and 11 to become PGA2 and PGA1, respectively, with a cyclopentenone ring replacing the cyclopentanone rings or their precursors and a newly established electrophilic site at carbon 11. This electrophilic site is probably less electrophilic that the carbon 9 sites of Δ12-PGJ2 and 15-deoxy-Δ12-PGJ2

The cyclopentenone structures of PGA2, PGA1, PGJ2, Δ12-PGJ2, and 15-d-Δ12,14-PGJ2 possess α,β-unsaturated carbonyl groups (see α,β-Unsaturated carbonyl compounds) which serve to establish high levels of chemical reactivity at nearby carbons 9, 11, and/or 13. These carbons are electrophiles that readily form covalent bonds by acting as acceptors in Michael reactions to form covalent bonds with exposed nucleophile sites, particularly thiol residues, in diverse proteins. The reaction inactivates or reduces the activity of various functionally important target proteins and is one mechanism by which cyclopentenone PGs influence cell function.

All of the reactions undergone by the above cited PGs occur spontaneously (i.e. are enzyme-independent) in aqueous media. This biochemistry sets very important limitations on the study of the cyclopentenone PGs and to a lesser extent on PGE2, PGE1, and PGD2: a) detection of the cyclopentenone PGs in tissues may and has often reflected their formation during tissue preparation; b) detection of PGE2, PGE1, and PGD2 in tissues may be underestimated because of losses due to their conversion to cyclopentenone PGs; c) the activities, as studied in vitro or in vivo, of PGJ2 may reflect its conversion to Δ12-PGJ2 or 15-deoxy-Δ12,14-PGJ2, those of Δ12-PGJ2 may reflect its conversion to 15-deoxy-Δ12,14-PGJ2, and those of PGE2, PGE1, or PGD2 may reflect their conversion to any of the cyclopentenone PGs; and d) the attachment of these compounds, similar to that in other Michael reactions, is reversible and therefore may be underestimated or go undetected in studies.

== Mechanisms of action ==
=== G protein coupled receptors ===
The PGJ2 series of cyclopentenone PGs bind to and activate the G protein-coupled receptor, Prostaglandin DP2 receptor, with 15-deoxy-Δ12,14-PGJ2 and PDJ2 exhibiting potencies comparable to PGD2 (i.e. Ki equilibrium constants ~20-45 nanomolar) and Δ12-PGJ2 having 10-fold lesser potency, at least on mouse DP2 receptor. These PGJ2's also bind and activate a second G protein-coupled receptor, Prostaglandin DP1 receptor, but require high concentrations to do so; this activation is not considered physiological. DP2 and DP1 are G protein-coupled receptors, with the DP2 receptor coupled to Gi alpha subunit-dependent depression of cellular cAMP levels and causing the potentiation cell injury in neural tissue cultures and with the DP1 receptor coupled to Gs alpha subunit-dependent increases in cellular cAMP levels and the suppression of cell injury in neural tissue cultures.

=== Peroxisome proliferator-activated receptor gamma ===
PGD2, PGJ2, Δ12-PGJ2, and 15-deoxy-Δ12,14-PGJ2 activate the transcription factor, PPARγ, with 15-deoxy-Δ12,14-PGJ2 being the most potent of the four PGs. Accordingly, further studies have focused on 15-deoxy-Δ12,14-PGJ2. This PG directly binds with and activates PPARγ thereby inducing the transcription of genes containing the PPARγ response element. In consequence of this action, 15-deoxy-Δ12,14-PGJ2 causes cells to engage the pathway of Programmed cell death termed Paraptosis, a form of cell suicide that differs from apoptosis by involving cytoplasmic vacuolization and mitochondrial swelling rather than plasma membrane blebbing, nuclear condensation and fragmentation, and apoptotic bodies. 15-Deoxy-Δ12,14-PGG2's activation of PPARγ and the induction of paraptosis is responsible for inhibiting the growth of cultured human breast, colon, prostate, and perhaps other cancer cell lines. Studies indicated the anti-inflammatory actions of the cyclopentenone prostaglandins show no or little dependency on their PPARγ-activating capacity.

=== Covalent modification of proteins ===
The electrophilic centers in the cyclopentenone ring of cyclopentenone PGs form covalent bonds with exposed nucleophilic centers, primarily the sulfur atom in the thiol residues of cysteine residues. Proteomics analyses have detected 368 proteins that are covalently modified by 15-deoxy-Δ12,14-PGJ2; these include numerous plasma membrane, cell signaling, glycolytic enzyme, cytoskeletal, and Chaperone (protein)s. This results in the addition of the PG to the protein by a Michael addition reaction and important modifications in the activity of target proteins that have key functions in cells. 15-Deoxy-Δ12,14-PGJ2 shows the greatest reactivity and has been the focus of these studies. Proteomic studies indicate that PGJs form adducts with over 358 proteins. This adduct formation has been studied with several functionally and/or clinically important proteins such as:

- IKK-β subunit of IκB kinase: IκB serves to retain NFκB in the cell cytoplasm thereby inhibiting it from entering the nucleus and acting as a transcription factor (see IkB kinase) to induce the transcription of genes, many of which contribute to regulating inflammatory responses. 15-deoxy-Δ12,14-PGJ2 forms an adduct with the IKK-β subunit of IκB kinase thereby inhibiting the kinases activity thereby promoting the entry of NFκB into the nucleus and stimulating the transcription of more than 15O proteins many of which regulate inflammatory responses. The net effect of this inhibition is to inhibit and/or refers inflammation.
- KEAP1: cytosolic KEAP1 serves to promote the degradation of Nrf2 by proteasomes thereby inhibiting this transcription factor from entering the nucleus and stimulating the transcription of numerous genes that for diverse antioxidant proteins such as HMOX1 which encodes the carbon monoxide-forming and anti-inflammatory protein, HO-1 (see Carbon monoxide §§ Chemistry and Physiology). 15-Deoxy-Δ12,14-PGJ2 forms adducts with KEAP1 cysteines 273 and 288 thereby blocking its ability to suppress activation of Nrf2's induction of antioxidant proteins. The ability of cyclopentenone prostaglandins to promote the transcription of Nrf2-dependent genes appears critical to their anti-inflammatory actions.
- eIF4A: eIF4A is an RNA helicase is essential for protein translation. 15-Deoxy-Δ12,14-PGJ2 forms an adduct with cysteine 264 in eIF4A to inhibit protein translation and cause TRAF2, an intracellular signaling protein required for the cell stimulating actions of the pro-inflammatory cytokine, TNFα, to sequester in cellular stress granules. The inhibition of protein translation can trigger programmed cell death responses while the sequestration of TRAF2 may suppress inflammatory responses. PGA1 has similar although less potent effects on protein translation and TRAF2 sequestration and therefore may also form an adduct with, and thereby inactivate, eIF4a.
- UCHL1: PGA1, Δ12-PGJ2, and 15-deoxy-Δ12,14-PGJ2 form adducts with the UCHL1 (Ubiquitin carboxy-terminal hydrolase L1), a protein that is found to be deposited as aggregate in the pathologically involved tissues of Parkinson's disease and well as other neurodegenerative diseases. In further studies, 15-deoxy-Δ12,14-PGJ2 was found to trigger Uch-L1 aggregate formation and suggested that this reaction may contribute to the development and/or progression of these diseases.
- H-Ras: 15-Deoxy-Δ12,14-PGJ2 forms a covalent bond with cysteine 184 on H-ras thereby activating this signaling protein and promoting the proliferation of cells.
- Epoxide hydrolase: 15-Deoxy-Δ12,14-PGJ2 inhibits soluble epoxide hydrolase 2 by forming adducts with its catalytic cysteine (Cys521) residue. This effect blocks the ability of the hydrolase to inactivate epoxyeicosatrienoic acids (EETs), particularly 14,15-EET. The EETs cause the vasodilation of arteries, including those of the heart. By blocking the production of 14,15-ETE and at least theoretically of other vasodilating ETEs, Epoxydocosapentaenoic acids, and/or Epoxydocosapentaenoic acids, 15-deoxy-Δ12,14-PGJ2 appears to cause the dilation of coronary arteries and thereby protect against cardiac ischemia and heart attack in a rat model.

One or more of the cyclopentenone prostaglandins also regulate other cell signaling pathways although the exact mechanism(s) behind this is not always clear. It (they) regulates signaling by: a) inhibiting the STAT3-Janus kinase pathway to block cellular pro-inflammatory responses; b) stimulating Suppressor of cytokine signaling 1, Suppressor of cytokine signaling 3, and Src homology 2 domain-containing protein phosphatase 2 pathways to inhibit the actions of pro-inflammatory cytokines; c) inhibiting the activation of ERK1, ERK2, Akt and a p38 mitogen-activated protein kinases pathways to inhibit the actions of pro-inflammatory cytokines and/or the differentiation of progenitor cells to pro-inflammatory Dendritic cells; d) regulating the cell cycle and cell proliferation by stimulating p21, cFos, Erg-1, and cMyc or inhibiting N-Myc, Cyclin D1, Cdk4, and Insulin-like growth factor 1; and e) regulating agents such as HSP70, GPR78, Gadd153, Ubiquitin B, and Ubiquitin C which contribute to the degradation of abnormal proteins.

== Preclinical Studies ==
=== Cellular Studies ===
Acting by inhibiting or stimulating the signaling pathways cited in the previous section, the cyclopentenone prostaglandins, principally 15-deoxy-Δ12,14-PGJ2, Δ12-PGJ2, PGJ2 and, in fewer studies, PGA2 and PGA1 have been shown to inhibit the function and/or survival of various pro-inflammatory, neurological, and other cell types. The three PGJ2 cyclopentenone prostaglandins induce apoptosis in rodent cultured neuron cells by a mechanism that involves inhibiting the Phosphoinositide 3-kinase signaling pathway; this inhibition is independent of their ability to activate PPARγ or their prostaglandin DP2 receptor.

=== Animal Studies ===
15-deoxy-Δ12,14-PGJ2, Δ12-PGJ2, PGJ2 and, in fewer studies, PGA2 and PGA1 inhibit the inflammatory response and tissue damage that follow experimentally-induced pancreatitis; glomerulonephritis; arthritis; spinal cord, brain, and lung injury; injury due to ischemia in the heart, brain, kidney, and gut; and stress-induced central nervous system trauma.

Rat Cerebral cortex neurons and human neuroblastoma SH-SY5Y cells become apoptotic when treated with micromolar levels of 15-d-Δ12,14-PGJ2; this effect appears due to the ability of 15-d-Δ12,15-PGJ2 to inhibit the Phosphoinositide 3-kinase pathway of cell signaling. The direct injection of 15-d-Δ12,14-PGJ2 into the hippocampus proved to impair contextual memory retrieval in rats, again apparently acting by inhibiting the Phosphoinositide 3-kinase pathway. Based on these and other studies, the overproduction of cyclopentenone prostaglandins by the brain has been suggested to contribute to the neuron injury observed in various rodent models of neurodegenerative diseases and therefore may be relevant to the development and/or progression of the neuron injury occurring in human diseases such as Alzheimer's disease and Parkinson's disease.

=== Human studies ===
15d-Δ12,14-PGJ2 and its PGD2 precursor have been demonstrated to suppress hair growth in studies of mouse and human follicular explant culture models; further studies examining the content of these two prostaglandins in normal and balding tissue of mice and humans have implicated PGD2 and to a much lesser extent 15d-Δ12,Δ14-PGJ2 in the development of male pattern baldness.
