= Prostaglandin =

Group of physiologically active lipid compounds

Chemical structure of prostaglandin E_{1} (alprostadil)

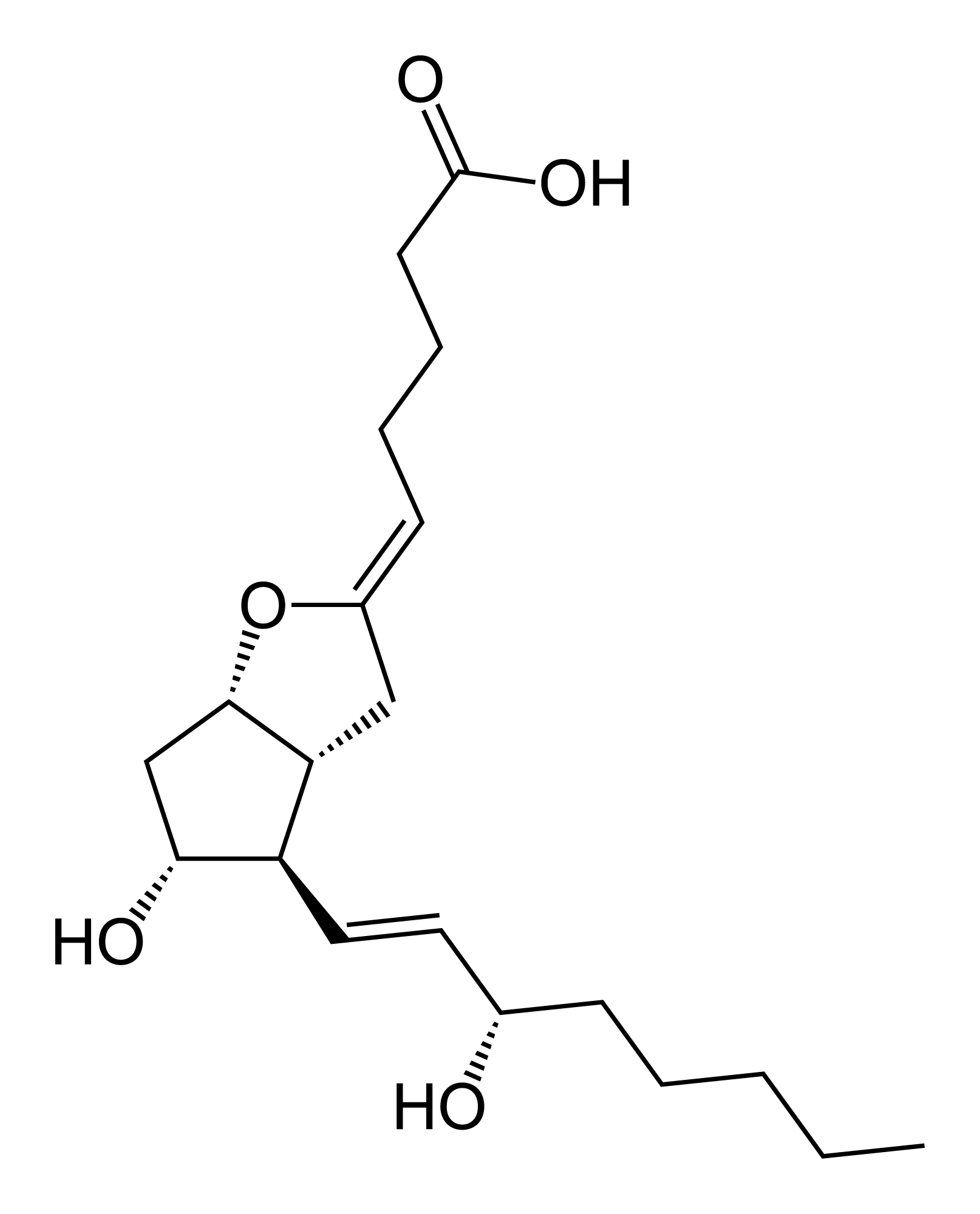
Chemical structure of prostaglandin I_{2} (prostacyclin)

Prostaglandins (PG) are a group of physiologically active lipid compounds that have diverse hormone-like effects in animals. They are a subclass of eicosanoids and of the prostanoid class of fatty acid derivatives. Prostaglandins have been found in almost every tissue in humans and other animals. They are derived enzymatically from the fatty acid arachidonic acid. Every prostaglandin contains 20 carbon atoms, including a 5-carbon ring.

The structural differences between prostaglandins account for their different biological activities. A given prostaglandin may have different and even opposite effects in different tissues in some cases. The ability of the same prostaglandin to stimulate a reaction in one tissue and inhibit the same reaction in another tissue is determined by the type of receptor to which the prostaglandin binds. They act as autocrine or paracrine factors with their target cells present in the immediate vicinity of the site of their secretion. Prostaglandins differ from endocrine hormones in that they are not produced at a specific site but in many places throughout the human body.

Prostaglandins are powerful, locally-acting vasodilators and inhibit the aggregation of blood platelets. Through their role in vasodilation, prostaglandins are also involved in inflammation. They are synthesized in the walls of blood vessels and serve the physiological function of preventing needless clot formation, as well as regulating the contraction of smooth muscle tissue. Conversely, thromboxanes (produced by platelet cells) are vasoconstrictors and facilitate platelet aggregation. Their name comes from their role in clot formation (thrombosis).

Specific prostaglandins are named with a letter indicating the type of ring structure, followed by a number indicating the number of double bonds in the hydrocarbon structure. For example, prostaglandin E_{1} has the abbreviation PGE_{1} and prostaglandin I_{2} has the abbreviation PGI_{2}.

== History and name ==
Systematic studies of prostaglandins began in 1930, when Kurzrock and Lieb found that human seminal fluid caused either stimulation or relaxation of strips of isolated human uterus. They noted that uteri from patients who had gone through successful pregnancies responded to the fluid with relaxation, while uteri from sterile women responded with contraction. The name prostaglandin derives from the prostate gland, chosen when prostaglandin was first isolated from seminal fluid in 1935 by the Swedish physiologist Ulf von Euler, and independently by the Irish-English physiologist Maurice Walter Goldblatt (1895–1967). Prostaglandins were believed to be part of the prostatic secretions, and eventually were discovered to be produced by the seminal vesicles. Later, it was shown that many other tissues secrete prostaglandins and that they perform a variety of functions. The first total syntheses of prostaglandin F_{2α} and prostaglandin E_{2} were reported by Elias James Corey in 1969, an achievement for which he was awarded the Japan Prize in 1989.

In 1971, it was determined that aspirin-like drugs could inhibit the synthesis of prostaglandins. The biochemists Sune K. Bergström, Bengt I. Samuelsson and John R. Vane jointly received the 1982 Nobel Prize in Physiology or Medicine for their research on prostaglandins.

== Biochemistry ==
=== Biosynthesis ===
Biosynthesis of eicosanoids

Prostaglandins are found in most tissues and organs. They are produced by almost all nucleated cells. They are autocrine and paracrine lipid mediators that act upon platelets, endothelium, uterine and mast cells. They are synthesized in the cell from the fatty acid arachidonic acid.

Arachidonic acid is created from diacylglycerol via phospholipase-A_{2}, then brought to either the cyclooxygenase pathway or the lipoxygenase pathway. The cyclooxygenase pathway produces thromboxane, prostacyclin and prostaglandin D, E and F. Alternatively, the lipoxygenase enzyme pathway is active in leukocytes and in macrophages and synthesizes leukotrienes.

=== Release of prostaglandins from the cell ===
Prostaglandins were originally believed to leave the cells via passive diffusion because of their high lipophilicity. The discovery of the prostaglandin transporter (PGT, SLCO2A1), which mediates the cellular uptake of prostaglandin, demonstrated that diffusion alone cannot explain the penetration of prostaglandin through the cellular membrane. The release of prostaglandin has now also been shown to be mediated by a specific transporter, namely the multidrug resistance protein 4 (MRP4, ABCC4), a member of the ATP-binding cassette transporter superfamily. Whether MRP4 is the only transporter releasing prostaglandins from the cells is still unclear.

==== Cyclooxygenases ====
Prostaglandins are produced following the sequential oxygenation of arachidonic acid, DGLA or EPA by cyclooxygenases (COX-1 and COX-2) and terminal prostaglandin syntheses. The classic dogma is as follows:

- COX-1 is responsible for the baseline levels of prostaglandins.
- COX-2 produces prostaglandins through stimulation.

However, while COX-1 and COX-2 are both located in the blood vessels, stomach and the kidneys, prostaglandin levels are increased by COX-2 in scenarios of inflammation and growth.

==== Prostaglandin E synthase ====
Prostaglandin E_{2} (PGE_{2}) — the most abundant prostaglandin — is generated from the action of prostaglandin E synthases on prostaglandin H_{2} (prostaglandin H2, PGH_{2}). Several prostaglandin E syntheses have been identified. To date, microsomal (named as misoprostol) prostaglandin E synthase-1 emerges as a key enzyme in the formation of PGE_{2}.

==== Other terminal prostaglandin synthases ====
Terminal prostaglandin syntheses have been identified that are responsible for the formation of other prostaglandins. For example, two types of prostaglandin-D synthase, hematopoietic-type PGDS and lipocalin-type PGDS, are responsible for the formation of PGD_{2} from PGH_{2}. Similarly, prostacyclin (PGI_{2}) synthase (PGIS) converts PGH_{2} into PGI_{2}. A thromboxane synthase (TxAS) has also been identified. Prostaglandin-F synthase (PGFS) catalyzes the formation of 9α,11β-PGF_{2α,β} from PGD_{2} and PGF_{2α} from PGH_{2} in the presence of NADPH. This enzyme has recently been crystallized in complex with PGD_{2} and bimatoprost (a synthetic analogue of PGF_{2α}).

== Functions ==
There are currently ten known prostaglandin receptors on various cell types. Prostaglandins ligate a sub-family of cell surface seven-transmembrane receptors, G-protein-coupled receptors. These receptors are termed DP1-2, EP1-4, FP, IP1-2, and TP, corresponding to the receptor that ligates the corresponding prostaglandin (e.g., DP1-2 receptors bind to PGD2).

The diversity of receptors means that prostaglandins act on an array of cells and have a wide variety of effects such as:

- create eicosanoids hormones
- act on thermoregulatory center of hypothalamus to produce fever
- increase mating behaviors in goldfish
- cause the uterus to contract (Note: Prostaglandins are released during menstruation, due to the destruction of the endometrial cells, and the resultant release of their contents. Release of prostaglandins and other inflammatory mediators in the uterus cause the uterus to contract. These substances are thought to be a major factor in primary dysmenorrhea.) and/or to relax
- prevent gastrointestinal tract from self-digesting, contributing to its mucosal defence in multifactorial way.

== Types ==
The following is a comparison of different types of prostaglandin, including prostaglandin I_{2} (prostacyclin; PGI_{2}), prostaglandin D_{2} (PGD_{2}), prostaglandin E_{2} (PGE_{2}), and prostaglandin F_{2α} (PGF_{2α}).

Type	Receptor	Receptor type	Function
PGI_{2}	IP	G_{s}	vasodilation; inhibit platelet aggregation; bronchodilation
PGD_{2}	PTGDR (DP1) and CRTH2 (DP2)	GPCR	produced by mast cells; recruits Th2 cells, eosinophils, and basophils; In mammalian organs, large amounts of PGD2 are found only in the brain and in mast cells; Critical to development of allergic diseases such as asthma
PGE_{2}	EP_{1}	G_{q}	bronchoconstriction; GI tract smooth muscle contraction; enhanced proliferation of T lymphocytes (Th1 sub-type)
PGE_{2}	EP_{2}	G_{s}	bronchodilation; GI tract smooth muscle relaxation; vasodilation; reduced intra-ocular pressure; regulation of B cells, T cells (CD4 & CD8) & antigen presenting cell function; pro-inflammatory cell development → inflammation & fever; suppression of NMDA receptor related neurotoxicity (only present within the central nervous system)
PGE_{2}	EP_{3}	G_{i}	uterus contraction (when pregnant); GI tract smooth muscle contraction; lipolysis inhibition; inhibitory effect on thermogenic pre-optic hypothalamus; stimulate nitric oxide synthesis → PGE2 synthesis → pyogenic; ↑ mast cell release of histamine (increasing allergy response); ↑ pain perception; hyperalgesia (wild type EP3 expression); ↑ autonomic neurotransmitters; ↑ platelet response to their agonists and ↑ atherothrombosis in vivo
PGE_{2}	EP_{4}	G_{s}	hyperalgesia; pyrogenic; supports regulatory T cell production; stimulate dendritic cell maturation (antigen presenting cells of skin & mucosa); inhibit antibody B cell proliferation; ↑ inflammatory region blood flow (pyogenic & erythema); Inhibitory effects of dorsal root ganglion (speculated reduction in allodynia & hyperalgesia); ↓ gastric acid secretion; ↑ gastric mucus secretion; Prostate cancer (↑ EP4 expression); ↑ corneal neovascularization; ↑ cochlea auditory brain stem response
PGF_{2α}	FP	G_{q}	uterus contraction; bronchoconstriction; urinary bladder contractions; vasoconstriction in cerebral circulation

== Role in pharmacology ==
=== Inhibition ===
Examples of prostaglandin antagonists are:

- NSAIDs (inhibit cyclooxygenase) and COX-2 selective inhibitors or coxibs
- Corticosteroids (inhibit phospholipase A_{2} production)
- Cyclopentenone prostaglandins may play a role in inhibiting inflammation
- Vitamin D_{3} and vitamin K_{2}.

=== Clinical uses ===
Synthetic prostaglandins are used:

- To induce childbirth (parturition) or abortion (PGE_{2} or PGF_{2(misoprostol)}, with or without mifepristone, a progesterone antagonist)
  - Induction of labour
- To prevent closure of ductus arteriosus in newborns with particular cyanotic heart defects (PGE_{1})
- As a vasodilator in severe Raynaud syndrome or ischemia of a limb
- In pulmonary hypertension
- In treatment of glaucoma (as in bimatoprost ophthalmic solution, a synthetic prostamide analog with ocular hypotensive activity) (PGF_{2α})
- To treat erectile dysfunction or in penile rehabilitation following surgery (PGE1 as alprostadil).
- To measure erect penis size in a clinical environment
- To treat egg binding in small birds

== Synthesis ==
The original synthesis of prostaglandins F2α and E2 is shown below. It involves a Diels–Alder reaction which establishes the relative stereochemistry of three contiguous stereocenters on the prostaglandin cyclopentane core.

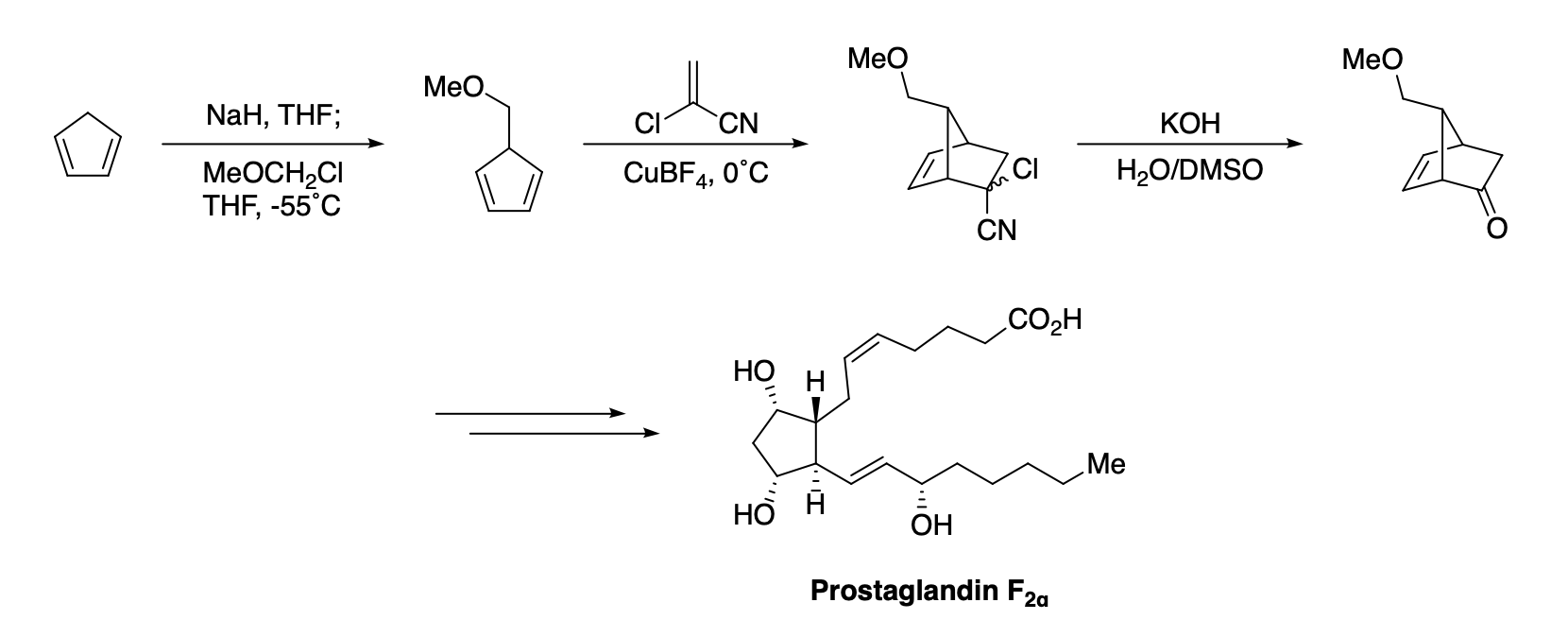
Diels-Alder in the total synthesis of prostaglandin F2α by E. J. Corey

== Prostaglandin stimulants ==
Cold exposure and IUDs may increase prostaglandin production.

== See also ==
- Oxaprostaglandin, a type of prostaglandin
- Prostamides, a chemically related class of physiologically active substances
