= CRELD2 =

Protein-coding gene in the species Homo sapiens

Identifiers
- Aliases: CRELD2, cysteine rich with EGF like domains 2
- External IDs: OMIM: 607171; MGI: 1923987; GeneCards: CRELD2
Enzyme activity
EC #	BRENDA	ExPASy	KEGG	MetaCyc
5.3.4.1	↗	↗	↗	↗

Gene location (Human)
Chr.	Chromosome 22 (human)
Band	22q13.33	Start	49,918,167 bp
Band	22q13.33	End	49,927,540 bp

Gene location (Mouse)
Chr.	Chromosome 15 (mouse)
Band	15|15 E3	Start	88,703,849 bp
Band	15|15 E3	End	88,710,886 bp
RNA expression pattern
Bgee	Human / Mouse (ortholog); Top expressed in: secondary oocyte; trachea; pituitary gland; anterior pituitary; tibia; body of pancreas; corpus epididymis; right lobe of thyroid gland; pericardium; pylorus / Top expressed in: spermatid; seminiferous tubule; seminal vesicula; primary oocyte; islet of Langerhans; lacrimal gland; condyle; spermatocyte; medullary collecting duct; vestibular membrane of cochlear duct; More reference expression data
BioGPS	More reference expression data
Orthologs
Databases	NCBI: entry; OMA: entry
Species	Human	Mouse
Entrez	79174	76737
Ensembl	ENSG00000184164	ENSMUSG00000023272
UniProt	Q6UXH1	Q9CYA0
RefSeq (mRNA)	NM_001135101; NM_001284317; NM_001284318; NM_024324	NM_029720
RefSeq (protein)	NP_001128573; NP_001271246; NP_001271247; NP_077300	NP_083996
Location (UCSC)	Chr 22: 49.92 – 49.93 Mb	Chr 15: 88.7 – 88.71 Mb
PubMed search
- Wikidata
View/Edit Human	View/Edit Mouse

Cysteine-rich with EGF-like domain protein 2 is a protein that in humans is encoded by the CRELD2 gene found on chromosome 22q13. It is a known homolog of CRELD1. CRELD2's identifying feature is a tryptophan-aspartic acid domain. It is a multifunctional glycoprotein that is approximately 60 kilodaltons and can reside in the endoplasmic reticulum (ER) or Golgi apparatus and be secreted spontaneously. It is implicated in numerous ER stress-related diseases including chronic liver disease, cardiovascular disease, kidney disease, and cancer.

== Structure ==
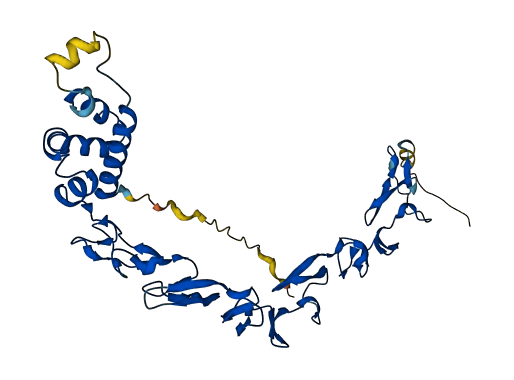
Structure of CRELD2

CRELD2 can present itself in a variety of isoforms with similar motifs but different functions.^{.} Common motifs include EGF/calcium binding EGF domains and furin cysteine-rich domains. The C-terminal of this protein includes the following specific amino acid sequence necessary for retention and secretion: (R/H)EDL. The N-terminal has multiple CXXC motifs which are vital for translocation and isomerase activity. CpG islands are present in the functional promoter region upstream of CRELD2. In this functional promoter region, GC nucleotides are abundant, and a TATA box is absent. An ERSE (ER Stress Responsible Element) is also present in CRELD2 and is conserved in numerous species.

== Function ==
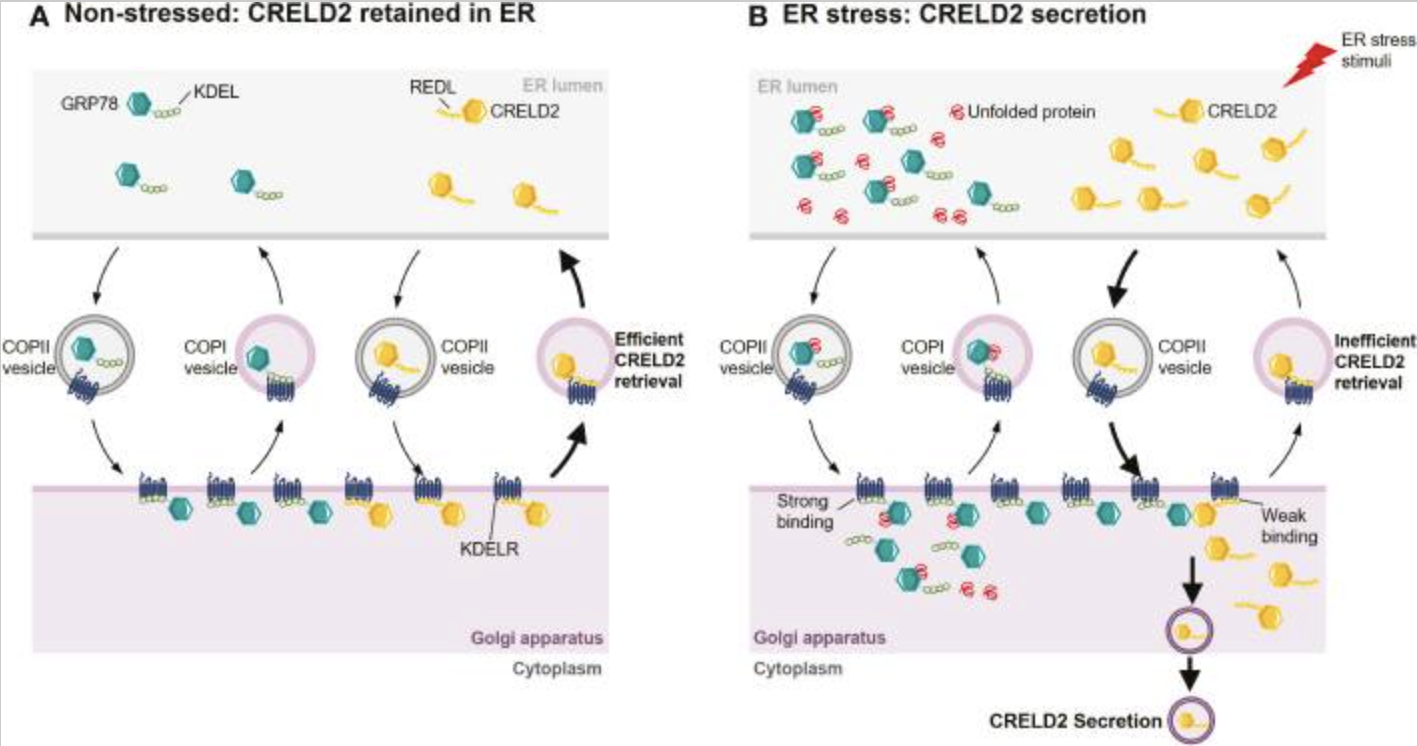
The mechanism of CRELD2 retention during normal conditions and CRELD2 secretion under ER stress conditions

The CXXC motif at the N-terminal of CRELD2 suggests that it plays a role in the quality control of ER proteins. At the C-terminal, the four amino acids (R/H)EDL modulate the secretion of CRELD2. CRELD2 can bind to KDEL receptors in the Golgi and be retrogradely transported to the ER. The presence of ER Stress Responsible Elements implies a regulatory role of CRELD2 during ER stress. CRELD2 may function to promote ER stress tolerance or assist in recovery from acute stress. The CRELD family is also implicated in developmental events.

== Tissue expression ==
Throughout the life span of an individual, CRELD2 displays ubiquitous expression. Expression of CRELD2 is found in most, if not all, tissues including skeletal muscle, heart, liver, kidney, and placenta. The expression of CRELD2 differs in adult tissue and fetal tissue. In adult tissue, CRELD2 is mainly expressed in pancreatic tissue, stomach tissue, duodenal tissue, salivary gland tissue, thyroid gland tissue, appendix tissue, and tracheal tissue. Fetal expression of CRELD2 occurs primarily in the following tissues: lung, liver, thymus, spleen, and heart. Expression of CRELD2 can be induced by inducing ER stress via chemicals such as Tm, Tg, and BFA.

== CRELD2 in diseases ==
=== Chronic liver disease ===
In adult mice, exposure to arsenic during gestation led to high levels of CRELD2 expression in the liver. Expression of CRELD2 in the livers of mice also increased following 24 hours of intraperitoneal Tm infusion. Furthermore, in older mice with a knockout for Grp78, alcohol resulted in an increase of methylation at CpG islands in genes involved in CRELD2 expression. Based on these studies utilizing mice models, CRELD2 is implicated in maintenance of liver homeostasis.

=== Chronic vascular diseases ===
CRELD2 has been highly implicated in chronic vascular diseases based on multiple studies. In cardiomyocytes of neonatal rats, administration of Tm led to increased levels of CRELD2 mRNA. When an ER-stress inhibitor, salubrinal, was administered, the observed effect was reversed. In another study, the aortic zone exhibited elevated CRELD2 expression which confirmed the presence of a mutation in the 3' untranslated region of FBN1 and associated ER stress response. Furthermore, aneurysmal samples from humans displayed high levels of CRELD2.

=== Cartilage and bone metabolism ===
CRELD is implicated in the homeostasis of cartilage and bone development based on numerous examples. In a mutant Matn3 model of multiple epiphyseal dysplasia, CRELD2 was found to be expressed at the highest levels in chondrocytes. In mouse models of ER-stress related growth plate diseases, CRELD2 expression was observed in hypertrophic zones. In addition, when ER stress was induced in cartilage treated with interleukin-1alpha, CRELD2 involvement was observed. Moreover, during osteogenic differentiation of mesenchymal stem cells mediated via bone morphogenic protein 9, CRELD2 displays high levels of up-regulation.

=== Cancer ===
ER stress, and thus CRELD2, are associated with the development of numerous types of cancer and tumor progression. Tumor angiogenesis can be promoted by CRELD2 up-regulating MB114 cell invasion. Additionally, CRELD2 was implicated as target of androgen receptors in prostate cancer. In renal cell carcinoma patients, CRELD2 expression was correlated with a poor prognosis. Furthermore, the presence of the CRELD2 gene and expression of the CRELD2 protein was linked to decreased chances of disease-free survival in cases of hepatocellular carcinoma. Another example implication the role of CRELD2 in cancer is exhibited in breast cancer. Tumor progression was promoted by high levels of CRELD2, while lack of adequate CRELD2 expression suppressed tumor growth.

== CRELD2 as a biomarker ==
Due to its association with ER stress, CRELD2 can be utilized as a biomarker in ER-stress related diseases. For example, prosthetic joint infection can be detected via the presence of CRELD2 in synovial fluid. Also, in males with NASH, decreased serum CRELD2 concentration led to higher levels of disease progression. Lastly, CRELD2 in the urine can be used as a biomarker for ER-stress related kidney diseases.
