= Piprant =

The piprants are a class of substances within pharmacology that act as prostaglandin antagonists.

== Properties ==
Schematic, simplified representation of the synthesis pathway and receptors (blue) of prostanoids (yellow); sites of action of piprants and other antagonists

The suffix -piprant was published in 2013 by the World Health Organization (WHO) for the International Non-proprietary Name of chemical compounds that target prostaglandin receptors (prostanoid receptors, PG receptors) and do not possess a prostanoid structure (i.e., a structure derived from prostanoic acid). They do not interfere with prostaglandin synthesis, distinguishing them from COX inhibitors, which suppress the biosynthesis of prostanoids from arachidonic acid by inhibiting cyclooxygenases. COX inhibitors are used as analgesics and non-steroidal anti-inflammatory drugs.

The prostaglandin receptors are G-protein-coupled receptors acting as membrane receptors and are divided into the following five types with a total of nine subtypes: prostaglandin D2 receptor, prostaglandin E receptors, FP, IP, and the thromboxane receptor (TXA2R).

The non-proprietary names of thromboxane receptor antagonists (TP antagonists) end in -troban.

== Representatives ==
Within the piprant class, the veterinary drug grapiprant, an EP_{4} receptor antagonist indicated in dogs for pain and inflammation associated with osteoarthritis, is approved for marketing. The DP_{1} receptor antagonist laropiprant was used in human medicine until 2013 to suppress flush syndrome caused by treatment with the lipid-lowering drug nicotinic acid.

Antagonists of the DP receptor include active substances against asthma, as the DP_{2} subtype in particular (also known as CRTh2, an abbreviation for chemoattractant receptor homologous molecule on Th2 cells) mediates allergic reactions and is involved in inflammatory processes in allergic asthma. Among the exclusively experimental representatives evaluated thus far, the development of the DP_{2} antagonists Fevipiprant, Vidupiprant, and Setipiprant as asthma medications failed, while the development of Timapiprant showed mixed results.

Chemical structure of Vorbipiprant

The therapeutic potential of EP_{4} antagonists is diverse and includes the treatment of inflammatory diseases, increased pain sensitivity (hyperalgesia), glaucoma, nephritis, and osteoporosis, as well as diseases in the field of oncology. Palupiprant and Vorbipiprant are under development for cancer immunotherapy.

Ebopiprant is an FP receptor antagonist (PGF_{2α} receptor antagonist) being developed to delay preterm birth in pregnant women.
