= Prostaglandin-D synthase =

Class of enzymes

prostaglandin-D synthase
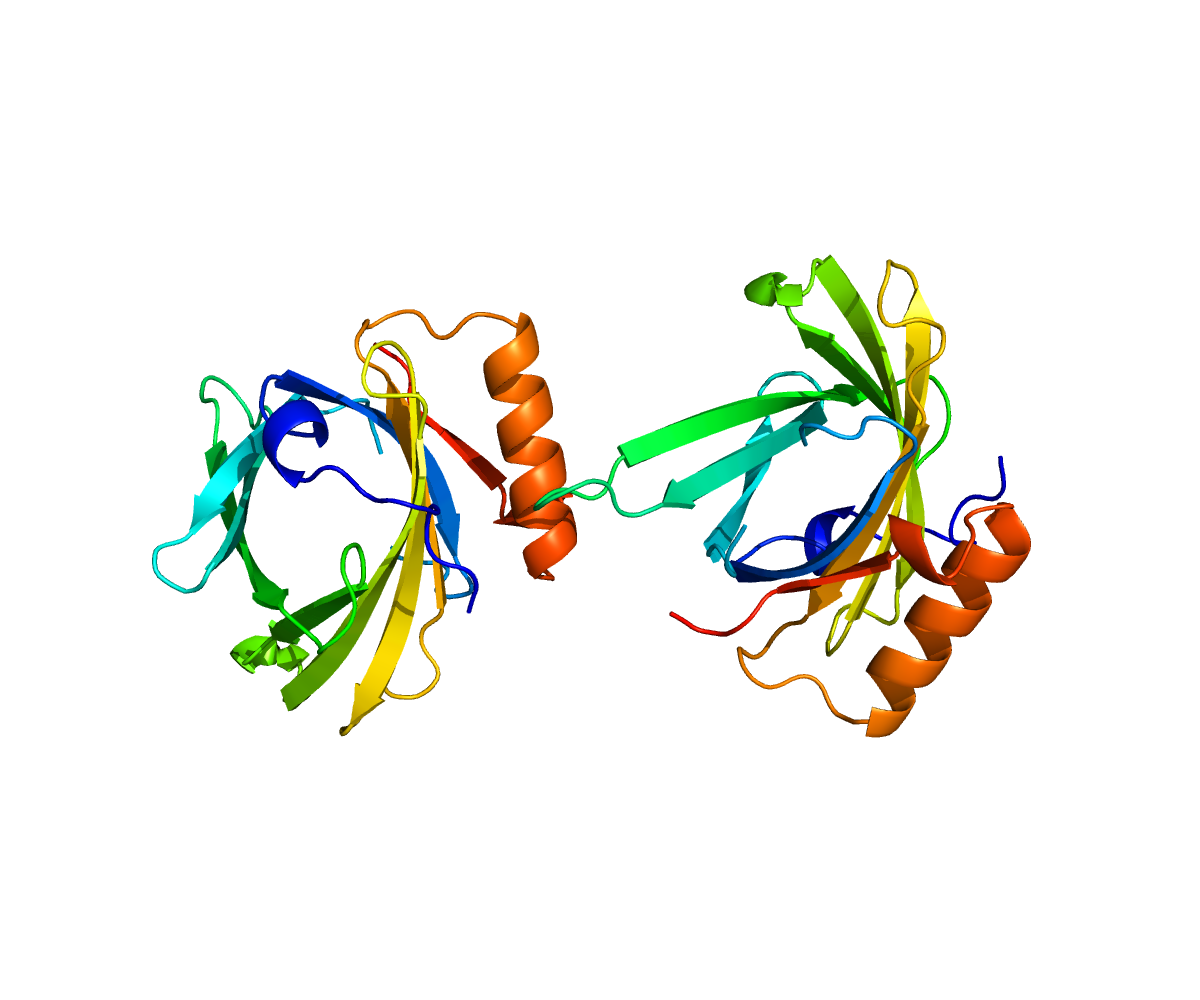
- Human Prostaglandin-D2 synthase. PDB 2wwp

Identifiers
- EC no.: 5.3.99.2
- CAS no.: 65802-85-9

Databases
- IntEnz: IntEnz view
- BRENDA: BRENDA entry
- ExPASy: NiceZyme view
- KEGG: KEGG entry
- MetaCyc: metabolic pathway
- PRIAM: profile
- PDB structures: RCSB PDB PDBe PDBsum
- Gene Ontology: AmiGO / QuickGO
Search
- PMC: articles
- PubMed: articles
- NCBI: proteins

In enzymology, a prostaglandin-D synthase (EC 5.3.99.2) is an enzyme that catalyzes the conversion of prostaglandin H2 to prostaglandin D2. In humans, there are two proteins that catalyze this reaction, encoded by the genes PTGDS and HPGDS. Using systematic notation, the chemical reaction is

(5Z,13E)-(15S)-9alpha,11alpha-epidioxy-15-hydroxyprosta-5,13- dienoate $\rightleftharpoons$ (5Z,13E)-(15S)-9alpha,15-dihydroxy-11-oxoprosta-5,13-dienoate

Thus, the substrate of this enzyme is (5Z,13E)-(15S)-9alpha,11alpha-epidioxy-15-hydroxyprosta-5,13-dienoate (aka PGH2), whereas its product is (5Z,13E)-(15S)-9alpha,15-dihydroxy-11-oxoprosta-5,13-dienoate (aka PGD2).

This enzyme belongs to the family of isomerases, specifically a class of other intramolecular oxidoreductases. The systematic name of this enzyme class is (5,13) - (15S)-9alpha,11alpha-epidioxy-15-hydroxyprosta-5,13-dienoate Delta-isomerase. Other names in everyday use include prostaglandin-H2 Delta-isomerase, prostaglandin-R-prostaglandin D isomerase, and PGH-PGD isomerase. This enzyme participates in arachidonic acid metabolism.

In March 2012, American scientists reported a discovery that shows this enzyme triggers male baldness. According to the discovery, levels of this enzyme are elevated in the cells of hair follicles located in bald patches on the scalp, but not in hairy areas. The research could lead to a cream to treat baldness.

== Structural studies ==
As of late 2001, 7 structures have been solved for this class of enzymes, with PDB accession codes 1IYH, 1IYI, 1PD2, 1V40, 2CZT, 2CZU, and 2E4J.

== See also ==
- Prostaglandin D2 synthase (Glutathione-Independent type)
- Hematopoietic prostaglandin D synthase (Glutathione-Dependent type)
