= Setipiprant =

Chemical compound

Clinical data
- Routes of administration: Oral
- ATC code: none

Legal status
- Legal status: Investigational

Identifiers
- IUPAC name: 2-[8-Fluoro-2-(naphthalene-1-carbonyl)-3,4-dihydro-1H-pyrido[4,3-b]indol-5-yl]acetic acid
- CAS Number: 866460-33-5
- PubChem CID: 49843471
- ChemSpider: 29738718
- UNII: BHF20LA2GM
- KEGG: D10326
- CompTox Dashboard (EPA): DTXSID00235739

Chemical and physical data
- Formula: C_{24}H_{19}FN_{2}O_{3}
- Molar mass: 402.425 g·mol^{−1}
- 3D model (JSmol): Interactive image
- SMILES: c15ccccc5cccc1C(=O)N(CC3)Cc2c3n(CC(O)=O)c(cc4)c2cc4F
- InChI: InChI=1S/C24H19FN2O3/c25-16-8-9-21-19(12-16)20-13-26(11-10-22(20)27(21)14-23(28)29)24(30)18-7-3-5-15-4-1-2-6-17(15)18/h1-9,12H,10-11,13-14H2,(H,28,29); Key:IHAXLPDVOWLUOS-UHFFFAOYSA-N

Setipiprant (INN; developmental code names ACT-129968, KYTH-105) is an investigational drug developed for the treatment of asthma and scalp hair loss. It was originally developed by Actelion and acts as a selective, orally available antagonist of the prostaglandin D_{2} receptor 2 (DP_{2}). The drug is being developed as a novel treatment for male pattern baldness by Allergan.

== Medical uses ==
=== Scalp hair loss ===
Acting through DP_{2}, PGD_{2} can inhibit hair growth, suggesting that this receptor is a potential target for bald treatment. A phase 2A study to evaluate the safety, tolerability, and efficacy of oral setipiprant relative to a placebo in 18- to 49-year-old males with androgenetic alopecia was completed in May 2018 and did not find statistically significant improvement.

=== Allergic conditions ===
Setipiprant proved to be well tolerated and reasonably effective in reducing allergen-induced airway responses in asthmatic patient clinical trials. However, the drug, while supporting the concept that DP2 contributes to asthmatic disease, did not show sufficient advantage over existing drugs and was discontinued from further development for this application.

== Adverse effects ==
Data from phase II and III clinical trials did not detect any severe adverse effects to setipiprant. The authors were unable to identify any pattern of adverse effects that differ from placebo, including subjective reporting of symptoms and objective laboratory monitoring.

== Interactions ==
While setipiprant mildly induces the drug metabolizing enzyme CYP3A4 in vitro, the interaction appears to not be clinically relevant.

== Pharmacology ==
=== Mechanism of action ===
==== Allergic conditions ====
Setipiprant binds to the DP_{2} receptor with a dissociation constant of 6 nM, representing potent antagonism of the receptor. The DP_{2} receptor, also called the CRTh2 receptor, is a G-protein-coupled receptor (GPCR) that is expressed on certain inflammatory cells, such as eosinophils, basophils, and certain lymphocytes. For its mechanism of action in the treatment of allergic conditions, setipiprant's DP_{2} antagonism prevents the action of prostaglandin D_{2} (PGD_{2}) on these receptors. The DP_{2} receptor mediates the activation of type 2 helper T (Th2) cells, eosinophils, and basophils in the lungs, which are white blood cells implicated in producing the inflammatory response the characterizes allergic conditions. Activation of DP_{2} on Th2 cells by PGD_{2} induces the secretion of inflammatory cytokines (interleukin (IL) 4, IL-5, and IL-13), which cause an increase of eosinophils in the blood, remodeling of lung tissue, and hypersensitivity of lung tissue to allergens.

Setipiprant does not antagonize the thromboxane receptor (TP). The bronchoconstricting properties of PGD_{2} are not inhibited by setipiprant, since these are mediated by the TP receptor. As a point of contrast, ramatroban is a selective TP antagonist and DP_{2} receptor antagonist.

Setipiprant does not appreciably inhibit the activity of the enzyme cyclooxygenase 1 (COX-1), which is responsible for the synthesis of prostaglandins (including PGD_{2}).

==== Scalp hair loss ====
Prostaglandin D2 synthase (PTGDS) is an enzyme that produces PGD_{2}. In men with androgenic alopecia, the enzyme PTGDS is elevated in the bald scalp tissue, as well as its product PGD_{2}. PGD_{2} inhibits the growth of hair follicles through its activity on the DP_{2} receptor, but not the DP_{1} receptor. Theoretically, setipiprant's DP_{2} receptor antagonism may counteract the activity of PGD_{2} in hair follicles, thereby stimulating hair growth.

=== Pharmacokinetics ===
The oral bioavailability of setipiprant is 44% in rats and 55% in dogs, which suggests that it should be orally bioavailable in humans. The half-life of setipiprant in humans is about 11 hours. The maximum concentration in plasma (C_{max}) is 6.04 and 6.44 mcg/mL for setipiprant tablets and capsules respectively, with an area under the curve of 31.88 and 31.50 mcg×hours/mL for setipiprant tablets and capsules respectively. C_{max} was reached between 1.8–4 hours after oral administration. The tablet and capsule formulations are bioequivalent.

== Chemistry ==
Setipiprant appears as a light yellow to yellow colored solid. Based on general guidelines, the powder form is considered stable for 2 years at 4 degrees C, and for 3 years as -20 degrees C. When dissolved in a solvent, setipiprant is stable for 1 month at -20 degrees C, and 6 months at -80 degrees C. It is considered soluble in DMSO at concentrations ≥ 36 mg/mL.

== History ==
Setipiprant was initially researched by Actelion as a treatment for allergies and inflammatory disorders, particularly asthma, but despite being well tolerated in clinical trials and showing reasonable efficacy against allergen-induced airway responses in asthmatic patients, it failed to show sufficient advantages over existing drugs and was discontinued from further development in this application.

However, following the discovery in 2012 that the prostaglandin D_{2} receptor (DP/PGD_{2}) is expressed at high levels in the scalp of men affected by male pattern baldness, the rights to setipiprant were acquired by Kythera to develop the drug as a novel treatment for baldness. The favorable pharmacokinetics and relative lack of side effects seen in earlier clinical trials mean that fresh clinical trials for this new application can be conducted fairly quickly. As of 2015, setipiprant is currently under development by Allergan for the prevention of androgenic alopecia after their successful acquisition of Kythera.

== See also ==
- Prostaglandin DP2 receptor
- Fevipiprant
- Ramatroban
