= Fevipiprant =

Chemical compound

Clinical data
- Routes of administration: Oral
- ATC code: none

Legal status
- Legal status: Investigational

Pharmacokinetic data
- Bioavailability: Unaffected by food
- Metabolism: Hepatic glucuronidation
- Elimination half-life: ~20 hours
- Excretion: Renal (≤30%)

Identifiers
- IUPAC name: {2-methyl-1-[4-(methylsulfonyl)-2-(trifluoromethyl)benzyl]-1H-pyrrolo[2,3-b]pyridin-3-yl}acetic acid
- CAS Number: 872365-14-5
- PubChem CID: 23582412
- ChemSpider: 23582412
- UNII: 2PEX5N7DQ4
- KEGG: D10631
- CompTox Dashboard (EPA): DTXSID501336031
- ECHA InfoCard: 100.243.911

Chemical and physical data
- Formula: C_{19}H_{17}F_{3}N_{2}O_{4}S
- Molar mass: 426.41 g·mol^{−1}
- 3D model (JSmol): Interactive image
- SMILES: CC1=C(C2=C(N1CC3=C(C=C(C=C3)S(=O)(=O)C)C(F)(F)F)N=CC=C2)CC(=O)O
- InChI: InChI=1S/C19H17F3N2O4S/c1-11-15(9-17(25)26)14-4-3-7-23-18(14)24(11)10-12-5-6-13(29(2,27)28)8-16(12)19(20,21)22/h3-8H,9-10H2,1-2H3,(H,25,26); Key:GFPPXZDRVCSVNR-UHFFFAOYSA-N

Fevipiprant (INN; code name QAW039) is a drug of the piprant class that was being developed by Novartis. It is a selective, orally available antagonist of the prostaglandin D_{2} receptor 2 (DP_{2} or CRTh2).

By 2016 it had advanced to phase III clinical trials for the treatment of asthma. However, in 2019 Novartis announced that it was removing fevipiprant from its development program, given that the medicine has failed in two clinical trials in patients with moderate-to-severe asthma. The firm said that it had hoped fevipiprant would be a billion-dollar-selling asthma drug.

A 2021 analysis sponsored by Novartis of the two phase III trials of fevipiprant concluded that "The ZEAL studies did not demonstrate significant improvement in lung function or other clinical outcomes. These results suggest that DP2 receptor inhibition with fevipiprant is not effective in the studied patient population".

== See also ==
- Grapiprant
- Setipiprant
