= Oxaprostaglandin =

11-oxaprostaglandin f_{2}α

11-oxaprostaglandin f_{2}β

An oxaprostaglandin is a type of prostaglandin with one carbon atom replaced by an oxygen atom. These are found in nature and have also been produced synthetically.

== Medical uses ==
A 13-oxaprostaglandin analogue has been shown to treat glaucoma and ocular hypertension. The 11-oxa prostaglandin analogue AL-12182 1 has potent topical ocular hypotensive activity. 7-Oxa-13-prostynoic acid promotes erythrocyte lysis and dissolution of erythrocyte membranes.

== Synthesis ==
11-Oxaprostaglandin f_{2}α and 11-oxaprostaglandin f_{2}β have been synthesized from D-glucose.
