= Prostaglandin D2 receptor =

Mammalian protein found in Homo sapiens

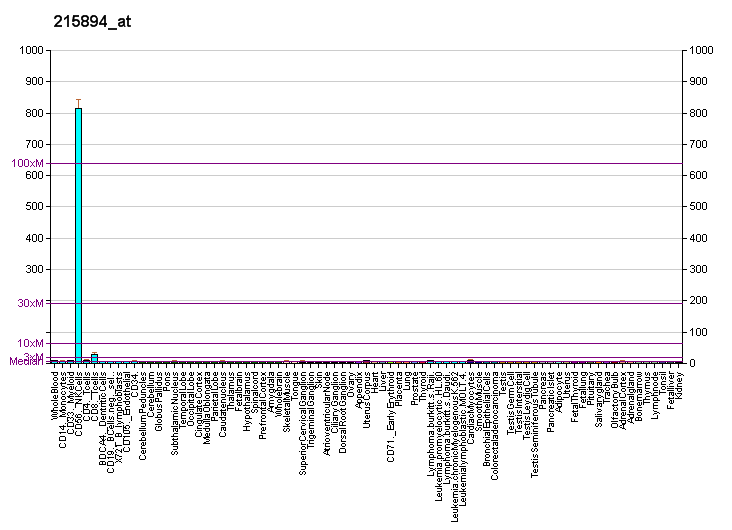
Gene expression pattern of the PTGDR gene

The prostaglandin D_{2} (PGD_{2}) receptors are G protein-coupled receptors that bind and are activated by prostaglandin D_{2}. Also known as PTGDR or DP receptors, they are important for various functions of the nervous system and inflammation. They include the following proteins:

- Prostaglandin D_{2} receptor 1 (DP_{1}) - PTGDR1
- Prostaglandin D_{2} receptor 2 (DP_{2}) - PTGDR2

== Structure ==
The PTGDR gene that encodes the prostaglandin D_{2} receptor in humans is found on the long arm of chromosome 14 at 14q22.1 and consists of four exons. A 1995 molecular cloning study of the prostaglandin D2 receptor derived from humans found that the corresponding cDNA encoded for a protein with 359 amino acids and molecular mass of 40,276 daltons. The receptor is a heterotrimeric G protein-coupled receptor, containing seven rhodopsin-like transmembrane domains, an extracellular NH2 terminus, and an intracellular COOH terminus.

The receptor contains a few structural sites at which it can interact with other molecules. For instance, there are three possible sites for N-glycosylation at the Asn-10, Asn-90, and Asn-297 residues. Protein kinase C can also phosphorylate the prostaglandin D2 receptor at two sites in the first and second cytoplasmic loops as well as at six sites in the COOH terminus.

== Signal transduction pathway ==
A 2014 journal article described that the PGD_{2} receptor signaling pathway begins with the binding of prostaglandin D_{2}. After PDG2 binds to the extracellular ligand site on the receptor, the G_{s} alpha subunit is activated. Activation of the G_{s} alpha subunit prompts activation of the enzyme adenylate cyclase, which is located on the cell membrane. Adenylate cyclase then catalyzes the change from ATP to cyclic AMP, or cAMP. The result of the PDG_{2} receptor signaling pathway is a rise in levels of second messenger cAMP, which can proceed to perform other tasks depending on the activated cell.

However, several other researchers make distinctions between the two prostaglandin D_{2} receptor subtypes and their G protein-coupled receptor pathways. They describe that the binding of PDG_{2} to PTGDR1 activates the G_{s} alpha subunit, resulting in the subsequent increase of cAMP. This stimulation of cAMP also involves activation of Protein Kinase A and influx of calcium ions through membrane channels. In contrast, the binding of PDG_{2} to PTGDR2 instead activates the G_{i} alpha subunit, decreasing cAMP levels and increasing intracellular calcium ion levels through inositol phosphate. These distinctions in signal transduction pathways mediate the different effects of these PDG_{2} receptor subtypes.

== Disease relevance ==
Inflammation: PTGDR1 signaling results in many non-inflammatory effects, such as inhibition of dendritic cell and Langerhans cell migration and eosinophil apoptosis. PTGDR2 mediates several pro-inflammatory effects, including the stimulation of T_{H}2 cells, ILC2, and eosinophils.

Asthma: Activation of PTGDR2 amplifies an inflammation cascade by upregulating the expression and release of type 2 cytokines through T_{H}2 cells, ILC2 cells, and eosinophils. These type 2 cytokines lead to symptoms like airway inflammation, increased mucus production, and mucus metaplasia, which are found in asthma conditions. Increase in PTGDR1 signal transduction results in vasodilation, which can promote the migration and likelihood of survival for inflammatory cell types.

Neurodegeneration: A 2018 study induced the prostaglandin D_{2} signaling pathway in mice via PTGDR2 to determine the impact on Parkinson's Disease-like pathology. The researchers observed that the mice with PG treatment developed loss of dopamine neurons in the substantia nigra pars compacta, motor deficits, and other progressive disease-like symptoms. They also discovered PGD_{2} receptors on dopaminergic cells but not on microglia.

Hair growth: The invention relates to compositions and methods for regulating hair growth. Specifically, the invention relates to regulating hair growth by regulating the activity one of the prostaglandin D2 (PGD2) receptors, DP-2 (GPR44). Compositions and methods for regulating hair growth include inhibiting hair growth by administering a DP-2 agonist, or stimulating hair growth by administering a DP-2 antagonist.

== See also ==
- Eicosanoid receptor
- Prostaglandin E_{2} receptor
