= Hematopoietic prostaglandin D synthase =

Protein-coding gene in the species Homo sapiens

HPGDS
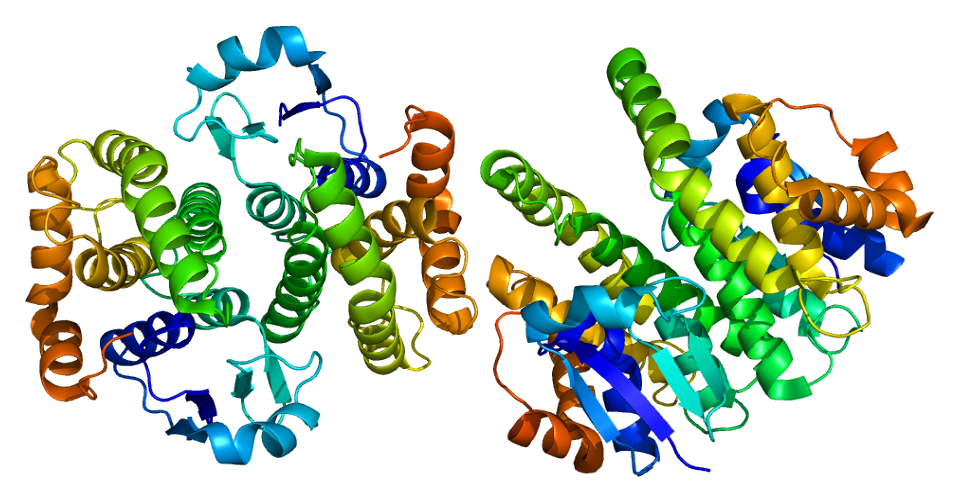
Available structures
PDB	Ortholog search: PDBe RCSB
PDB	List of PDB id codes 1IYH, 1IYI, 1V40, 2CVD, 2VCQ, 2VCW, 2VCX, 2VCZ, 2VD0, 2VD1, 3EE2, 3KXO, 3VI5, 3VI7, 4EC0, 4EDY, 4EDZ, 4EE0, 5AIS, 5AIV, 5AIX

Identifiers
- Aliases: HPGDS, GSTS, GSTS1-1, PGD2, PGDS, GSTS1, hematopoietic prostaglandin D synthase
- External IDs: OMIM: 602598; MGI: 1859384; HomoloGene: 113741; GeneCards: HPGDS; OMA:HPGDS - orthologs
- EC number: 2.5.1.18

Gene location (Human)
Chr.	Chromosome 4 (human)
Band	4q22.3	Start	94,298,535 bp
Band	4q22.3	End	94,342,876 bp

Gene location (Mouse)
Chr.	Chromosome 6 (mouse)
Band	6|6 C1	Start	65,094,277 bp
Band	6|6 C1	End	65,121,892 bp
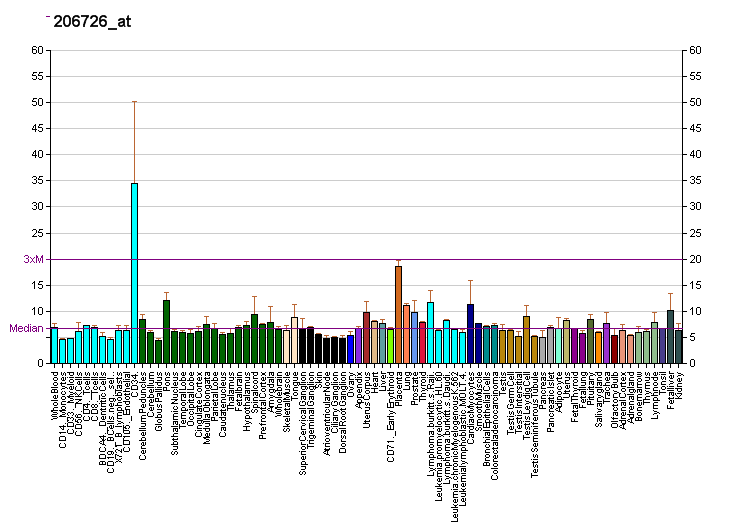
RNA expression pattern
Bgee	Human / Mouse (ortholog); Top expressed in: testicle; placenta; Achilles tendon; gallbladder; synovial membrane; amniotic fluid; mucosa of transverse colon; rectum; synovial joint; tendon of biceps brachii / Top expressed in: genital tubercle; primordial germ cell; calvaria; stroma of bone marrow; hair; Sertoli cell; yolk sac; ooblast; cornea; uterus; More reference expression data
BioGPS	More reference expression data
Gene ontology
Molecular function	transferase activity; calcium ion binding; protein homodimerization activity; isomerase activity; metal ion binding; prostaglandin-D synthase activity; protein binding; magnesium ion binding; glutathione transferase activity
Cellular component	cytoplasm; cytosol
Biological process	prostaglandin metabolic process; locomotory behavior; lipid metabolism; cyclooxygenase pathway; fatty acid metabolic process; fatty acid biosynthetic process; prostaglandin biosynthetic process; glutathione derivative biosynthetic process; signal transduction; negative regulation of male germ cell proliferation; glutathione metabolic process
Sources:Amigo / QuickGO
Orthologs
Species	Human	Mouse
Entrez	27306	54486
Ensembl	ENSG00000163106	ENSMUSG00000029919
UniProt	O60760	Q9JHF7
RefSeq (mRNA)	NM_014485	NM_019455
RefSeq (protein)	NP_055300	NP_062328
Location (UCSC)	Chr 4: 94.3 – 94.34 Mb	Chr 6: 65.09 – 65.12 Mb
PubMed search
- Wikidata
View/Edit Human	View/Edit Mouse

Hematopoietic prostaglandin D synthase protein, also known as Glutathione-Dependent PGD Synthase, is a protein that in humans is encoded by the HPGDS gene.

HPGDS is a bifunctional enzyme. One of its functions is to act as a Prostaglandin-D synthase by catalyzing the conversion of PGH2 to PGD2. As part of this, it plays a role in the production of prostanoids in the immune system and mast cells. It is also a sigma class glutathione-S-transferase family member, and so its other function is to catalyze the conjugation of glutathione by certain aryl halides and isothiocyanates. The presence of this enzyme can be used to identify the differentiation stage of human megakaryocytes.

== See also ==
- Prostaglandin D2 synthase PTGDS
