= Grapiprant =

NSAID anti-inflammatory veterinary drug

Clinical data
- Trade names: Galliprant
- Routes of administration: By mouth
- ATCvet code: QM01AX92 (WHO)

Legal status
- Legal status: CA: ℞-only; US: ℞-only

Pharmacokinetic data
- Bioavailability: 6.6 L/kg, high volume of distribution
- Elimination half-life: 5.86 hours in horses
- Excretion: Kidney

Identifiers
- IUPAC name: 3-{2-[4-(2-ethyl-4,6-dimethyl-1H-imidazo[4,5-c]pyridin-1-yl)phenyl]ethyl}-1-(4-methylbenzenesulfonyl)urea
- CAS Number: 415903-37-6
- PubChem CID: 11677589
- DrugBank: DB12836
- ChemSpider: 9852318
- UNII: J9F5ZPH7NB
- CompTox Dashboard (EPA): DTXSID60194419

Chemical and physical data
- Formula: C_{26}H_{29}N_{5}O_{3}S
- Molar mass: 491.61 g·mol^{−1}
- 3D model (JSmol): Interactive image
- SMILES: CCc1nc2c(C)nc(C)cc2n1-c1ccc(CCNC(=O)NS(=O)(=O)c2ccc(C)cc2)cc1
- InChI: InChI=1S/C19H22N2OS/c1-14(22)15-9-10-19-17(13-15)21(12-6-11-20(2)3)16-7-4-5-8-18(16)23-19/h4-5,7-10,13H,6,11-12H2,1-3H3; Key:HZVLFTCYCLXTGV-UHFFFAOYSA-N

Grapiprant, sold under the brand name Galliprant, is a small molecule drug that belongs in the piprant class. This analgesic and anti-inflammatory drug is primarily used as a pain relief for mild to moderate inflammation related to osteoarthritis in dogs. Grapiprant has been approved by the FDA's Center for Veterinary Medicine and was categorized as a non-cyclooxygenase inhibiting non-steroidal anti-inflammatory drug (NSAID) in March 2016.

Preclinical studies also indicate that grapiprant is not only efficacious as a reliever of acute pain but also in chronic pain relief and inflammation. The effect of the drug is directly proportional to the dosage and its effects are comparable to human medications such as rofecoxib and piroxicam.

Grapiprant has also been tested in humans, and was researched to be used as pain control for inflammation associated with osteoarthritis.

Grapiprant is widely accepted in veterinary medicine due to its specific and targeted approach to pain management in dogs. The serum concentration of grapiprant is increased when used in conjunction with other drugs such as acetaminophen, albendazole, and alitretinoin.

Common side effects are intestinal related effects such as mild diarrhea, appetite loss, and vomiting. It can also cause decreased albumin levels.

== Medical uses ==
Grapiprant is indicated for the control of pain and inflammation associated with osteoarthritis in dogs.

== Mechanism of action ==
The effect of grapiprant can be explained through the function of prostaglandin E2, which acts as a pro-inflammatory mediator of redness of the skin, edema, and pain, which are the typical signs of inflammation. The effect of PGE2 stems from its action through the four prostaglandin receptor subgroups, EP1, EP2, EP3, and EP4, in which the prostaglandin EP4 receptor acts as the main intermediary of the prostaglandin-E2-driven inflammation. Grapiprant acts as a specific antagonist that binds and blocks the prostaglandin EP4 receptor, one out of the four prostaglandin E2 (PGE2) receptor subgroups. The EP4 receptor then mediates the prostaglandin-E2-elicited response to pain, and hence grapiprant was proven to be effective in the decrease of pain in several inflammatory pain models of rats. It was also proven to be effective in reducing osteoarthritis-related pain in humans, which serves as a proof for its mechanism of action. The approximate efficacious dose in canines is 1.3 to 1.7 mg/kg, in conjunction with a methylcellulose suspending agent. Based on the calculations from the comparisons of binding affinity of grapiprant to the EP4 receptors of dogs, rats, and humans, the study of plasma and serum protein binding determinations, the effective doses determined in inflammation pain models of rats, and human-related clinical studies, it is evaluated that Grapiprant should be administered just once a day. The approved dose of the commercial Grapiprant tablet by the FDA for the pain relief and inflammation associated with osteoarthritis to dogs is reported to be 2 mg/kg a day.

== Absorption ==
Studies in animals such as horses have shown the presence of grapiprant in serum 72 hours with a concentration >0.005 ng/mL after the initial administration of a dose of 2 mg/kg. Grapiprant is expeditiously absorbed and the reported serum concentration was reported to be 31.9 ng/ml in an amount of time of 1.5 hours. The actual body exposure to grapiprant after administration of one dose was shown to be 2000 ng·hr/mL. The degree and rate at which grapiprant is absorbed into the body, presents a mean bioavailability of 39%. A significant reduction in the bioavailability, concentration time and maximal concentration were reported to have occurred after food intake. And thus, grapiprant is usually not administered with food as it will not be as efficient.

== Distribution ==
The volume of distribution in cat studies was reported to be 918 ml/kg.

== Route of elimination ==
Following an oral administration, the majority of the dose was metabolized within the first 72 hours. Equine studies have shown that grapiprant is present in urine 96 hours after the first administration of a dose of 2 mg/kg and has a concentration >0.005 ng/ml. From the excreted dose conducted in horses, it is found that 55%, 15% and 19% of the orally-administered dose was excreted in bile, urine, and faeces respectively.

== Toxicity ==
Safety studies conducted on grapiprant have demonstrated that it generally possesses an acceptable safety profile and a wide safety margin in veterinary studies. In animal studies, a research on 2.5–12 times overdose was conducted for grapiprant and the study resulted in soft stool and mucus-filled faeces, occasional bloody stools and emesis.
