= CRELD1 =

Protein-coding gene in humans

Identifiers
- Aliases: CRELD1, AVSD2, CIRRIN, cysteine rich with EGF like domains 1
- External IDs: OMIM: 607170; MGI: 2152539; HomoloGene: 32265; GeneCards: CRELD1; OMA:CRELD1 - orthologs

Gene location (Human)
Chr.	Chromosome 3 (human)
Band	3p25.3	Start	9,933,822 bp
Band	3p25.3	End	9,945,413 bp

Gene location (Mouse)
Chr.	Chromosome 6 (mouse)
Band	6 E3|6 52.77 cM	Start	113,460,258 bp
Band	6 E3|6 52.77 cM	End	113,470,304 bp
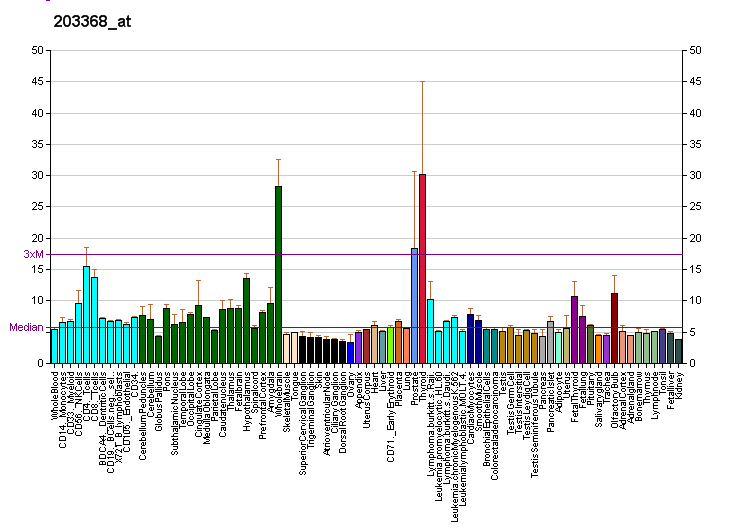
RNA expression pattern
Bgee	Human / Mouse (ortholog); Top expressed in: right hemisphere of cerebellum; pituitary gland; right lobe of thyroid gland; anterior pituitary; right uterine tube; apex of heart; right frontal lobe; left lobe of thyroid gland; primary visual cortex; Brodmann area 9 / Top expressed in: transitional epithelium of urinary bladder; decidua; dentate gyrus of hippocampal formation granule cell; olfactory tubercle; superior frontal gyrus; superior colliculus; triceps brachii muscle; primary visual cortex; central gray substance of midbrain; subiculum; More reference expression data
BioGPS	More reference expression data
Gene ontology
Molecular function	calcium ion binding; extracellular matrix structural constituent
Cellular component	membrane; integral component of membrane; collagen-containing extracellular matrix
Biological process	endocardial cushion development; cardiac septum development
Sources:Amigo / QuickGO
Orthologs
Species	Human	Mouse
Entrez	78987	171508
Ensembl	ENSG00000163703	ENSMUSG00000030284
UniProt	Q96HD1	Q91XD7
RefSeq (mRNA)	NM_001031717; NM_001077415; NM_015513	NM_133930
RefSeq (protein)	NP_001026887; NP_001070883; NP_056328; NP_001361245; NP_001361246 NP_001361247; NP_001361248; NP_001361249	NP_598691
Location (UCSC)	Chr 3: 9.93 – 9.95 Mb	Chr 6: 113.46 – 113.47 Mb
PubMed search
- Wikidata
View/Edit Human	View/Edit Mouse

Cysteine-rich with EGF-like domain protein 1 is a protein that in humans is encoded by the CRELD1 gene.

== Function ==
Epidermal growth factor (EGF)-like repeats are a class of cysteine-rich domains that mediate interactions between proteins of diverse function. EGF domains are found in proteins that are either completely secreted or have transmembrane regions that tether the protein to the cell surface. CRELD1 is the founding member of a family of matricellular proteins.
