= GPR78 =

Protein-coding gene in the species Homo sapiens

Identifiers
- Aliases: GPR78, G protein-coupled receptor 78
- External IDs: OMIM: 606921; GeneCards: GPR78

Gene location (Human)
Chr.	Chromosome 4 (human)
Band	4p16.1	Start	8,558,725 bp
Band	4p16.1	End	8,619,761 bp
RNA expression pattern
Bgee	Human / Mouse (ortholog); Top expressed in: left ovary; right ovary; vagina; stromal cell of endometrium; ectocervix; right uterine tube; canal of the cervix; skin of hip; gallbladder; prefrontal cortex / n/a; More reference expression data
BioGPS	n/a
Gene ontology
Molecular function	G protein-coupled receptor activity; signal transducer activity; protein binding
Cellular component	integral component of membrane; plasma membrane; membrane; intracellular anatomical structure
Biological process	G protein-coupled receptor signaling pathway; adenylate cyclase-activating G protein-coupled receptor signaling pathway; signal transduction
Sources:Amigo / QuickGO
Orthologs
Databases	NCBI: entry; OMA: entry
Species	Human	Mouse
Entrez	27201	n/a
Ensembl	ENSG00000155269	n/a
UniProt	Q96P69	n/a
RefSeq (mRNA)	NM_080819	n/a
RefSeq (protein)	NP_543009	n/a
Location (UCSC)	Chr 4: 8.56 – 8.62 Mb	n/a
PubMed search		n/a
- Wikidata
View/Edit Human

Probable G-protein coupled receptor 78 is a protein that in humans is encoded by the GPR78 gene.

G protein-coupled receptors (GPCRs, or GPRs) contain 7 transmembrane domains and transduce extracellular signals through heterotrimeric G proteins.[supplied by OMIM]
