= Prostaglandin H2 =

Prostaglandin H_{2}

Names
- Other names PGH_{2}, Endoperoxide H_{2}, Prostaglandin R_{2}

Identifiers
CAS Number	42935-17-1
3D model (JSmol)	Interactive image
ChEBI	CHEBI:15554
ChemSpider	392800
IUPHAR/BPS	4483
MeSH	Prostaglandin+H2
PubChem CID	445049
UNII	J670X3LRU2
CompTox Dashboard (EPA)	DTXSID80903949
- InChI: InChI=1S/C20H32O5/c1-2-3-6-9-15(21)12-13-17-16(18-14-19(17)25-24-18)10-7-4-5-8-11-20(22)23/h4,7,12-13,15-19,21H,2-3,5-6,8-11,14H2,1H3,(H,22,23)/b7-4-,13-12+/t15-,16+,17+,18-,19+/m0/s1 Key: YIBNHAJFJUQSRA-YNNPMVKQSA-N; InChI=1/C20H32O5/c1-2-3-6-9-15(21)12-13-17-16(18-14-19(17)25-24-18)10-7-4-5-8-11-20(22)23/h4,7,12-13,15-19,21H,2-3,5-6,8-11,14H2,1H3,(H,22,23)/b7-4-,13-12+/t15-,16+,17+,18-,19+/m0/s1 Key: YIBNHAJFJUQSRA-YNNPMVKQBN
- SMILES: O=C(O)CCC/C=C\C[C@H]2[C@H]1OO[C@H](C1)[C@@H]2/C=C/[C@@H](O)CCCCC

Properties
Chemical formula	C_{20}H_{32}O_{5}
Molar mass	352.465 g/mol
Density	1.129 ± 0.06 g/mL
Boiling point	490 ± 40.0 °C
Solubility in water	0.034 g/L
- Except where otherwise noted, data are given for materials in their standard state (at 25 °C [77 °F], 100 kPa). verify (what is ?) Infobox references

Prostaglandin H_{2} (PGH_{2}), or prostaglandin H2 (PGH2), is a type of prostaglandin and a precursor for many other biologically significant molecules. It is synthesized from arachidonic acid in a reaction catalyzed by a cyclooxygenase enzyme. The conversion from arachidonic acid to prostaglandin H_{2} is a two-step process. First, COX-1 catalyzes the addition of two free oxygens to form the 1,2-dioxane bridge and a peroxide functional group to form prostaglandin G_{2} (PGG_{2}). Second, COX-2 reduces the peroxide functional group to a secondary alcohol, forming prostaglandin H_{2}. Other peroxidases like hydroquinone have been observed to reduce PGG_{2} to PGH_{2}. PGH_{2} is unstable at room temperature, with a half life of 90–100 seconds, so it is often converted into a different prostaglandin. PGH_{2} is produced by every type of cell except for red blood cells and has a wide range of effects in the body.

Eicosanoid synthesis – prostaglandin H_{2} near center

It is acted upon by:

- prostacyclin synthase to create prostacyclin
- thromboxane-A synthase to create thromboxane A2 and 12-(S)-hydroxy-5Z,8E,10E-heptadecatrienoic acid (HHT) (see 12-Hydroxyheptadecatrienoic acid)
- prostaglandin D_{2} synthase to create prostaglandin D_{2}
- prostaglandin E synthase to create prostaglandin E_{2}
- prostaglandin F synthase to create prostaglandin F_{2α}

It rearranges non-enzymatically to:

- A mixture of 12-(S)-hydroxy-5Z,8E,10E-heptadecatrienoic acid (HHT) and 12-(S)-hydroxy-5Z,8Z,10E-heptadecatrienoic acid (see 12-hydroxyheptadecatrienoic acid)
  - These breakdown products are associated with increased aggregation of Amyloid beta peptides and Alzheimer's disease.

Functions of prostaglandin H_{2}:

- regulating the constriction and dilation of blood vessels
- stimulating platelet aggregation
  - binds to thromboxane receptor on platelets' cell membranes to trigger platelet migration and adhesion to other platelets

Effects of aspirin on prostaglandin H_{2}:

- Aspirin inhibits the conversion of arachidonic acid to prostaglandin

Figure 1: Synthetic pathways from PGH_{2} (the parent compound) to prostaglandins, prostacyclin and thromboxanes

== History ==
Prostaglandin H_{2} was discovered in 1973 by Diederik H. Nugteren and Elly Christ-Hazelhof while they were researching the formation of prostaglandin E_{2} from arachidonic acid using enzymes found in vesicular glands.

== Synthesis ==
The original synthesis of prostaglandin H_{2} by Diederik H. Nugteren and Elly Christ-Hazelhof was performed in 1973. Sheep vesicular glands were homogenized with 1M KH_{2}PO_{4} and 0.001 M EDTA buffer and then centrifuged to isolate the COX-1 enzymes. Pure arachidonic acid was added to a solution containing the enzymes, and the mixture was shaken. Thin-layer chromatography was used to isolate a band of prostaglandin H_{2}.

In 1986, due to low prostaglandin H_{2} product purity from thin-layer chromatography and column chromatography, high-performance liquid chromatography with hexane and isopropanol as solvents was developed as an alternative means of isolating the prostaglandin with 98% purity.
