= Prostaglandin D2 synthase =

Protein-coding gene in the species Homo sapiens

PTGDS
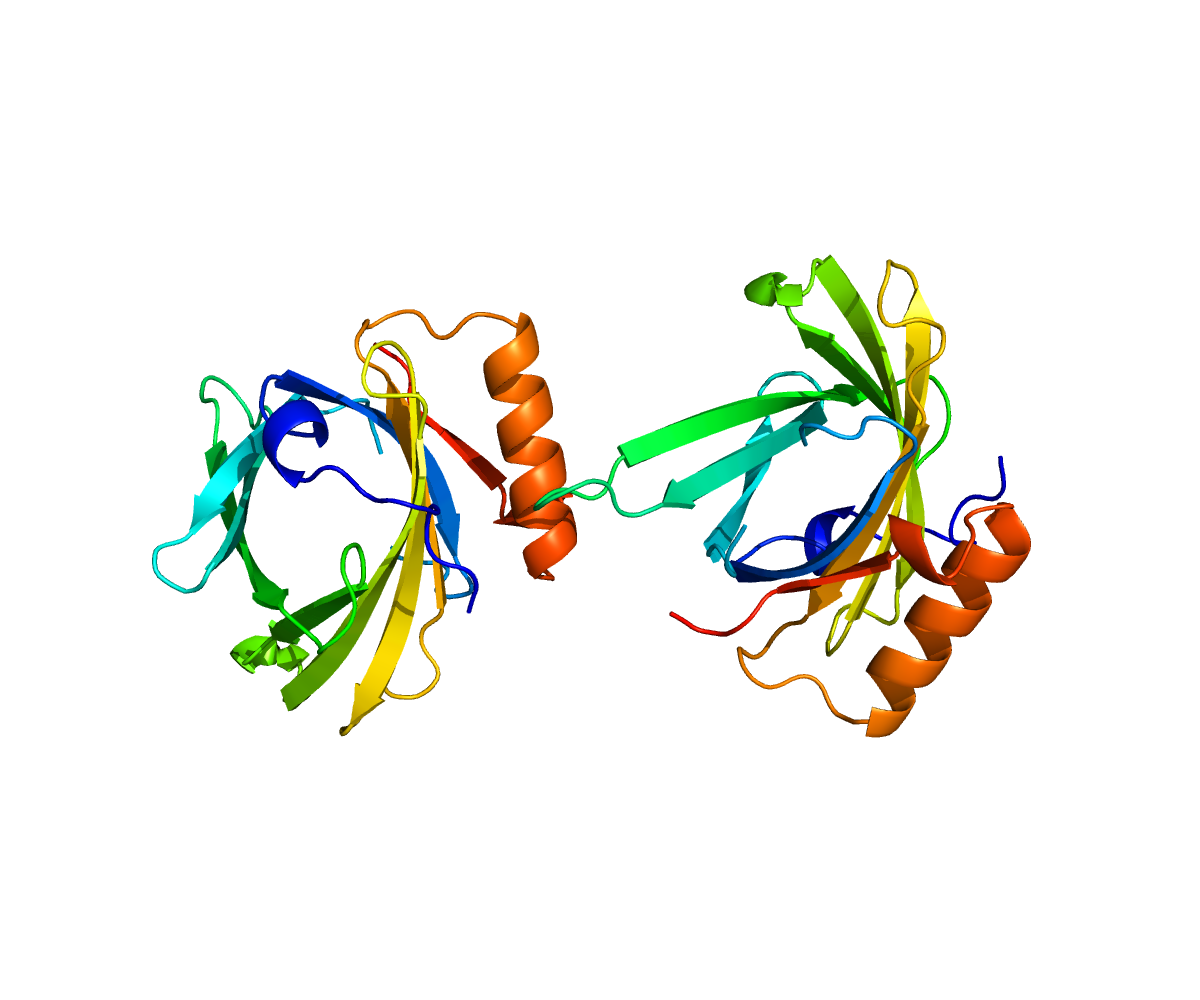
Available structures
PDB	Ortholog search: PDBe RCSB
PDB	List of PDB id codes 4OS8, 2WWP, 3O19, 3O22, 3O2Y, 4IMN, 4IMO, 4ORR, 4ORS, 4ORU, 4ORW, 4ORX, 4ORY, 4OS0, 4OS3

Identifiers
- Aliases: PTGDS, L-PGDS, LPGDS, PDS, PGD2, PGDS, PGDS2, prostaglandin D2 synthase
- External IDs: OMIM: 176803; MGI: 99261; HomoloGene: 737; GeneCards: PTGDS; OMA:PTGDS - orthologs
- EC number: 5.3.99.2

Gene location (Human)
Chr.	Chromosome 9 (human)
Band	9q34.3	Start	136,975,092 bp
Band	9q34.3	End	136,981,742 bp

Gene location (Mouse)
Chr.	Chromosome 2 (mouse)
Band	2 A3|2 17.28 cM	Start	25,356,721 bp
Band	2 A3|2 17.28 cM	End	25,360,058 bp
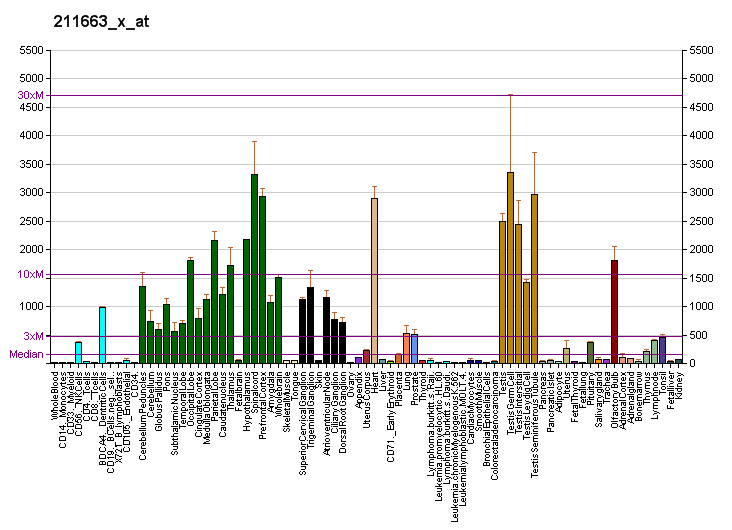

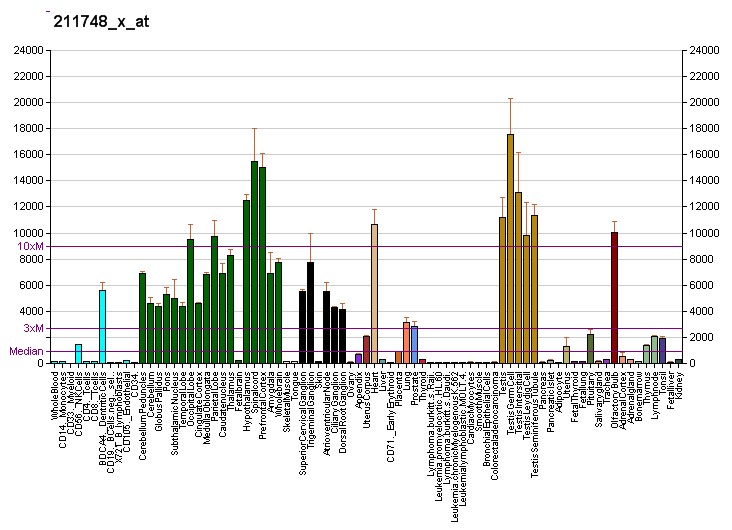

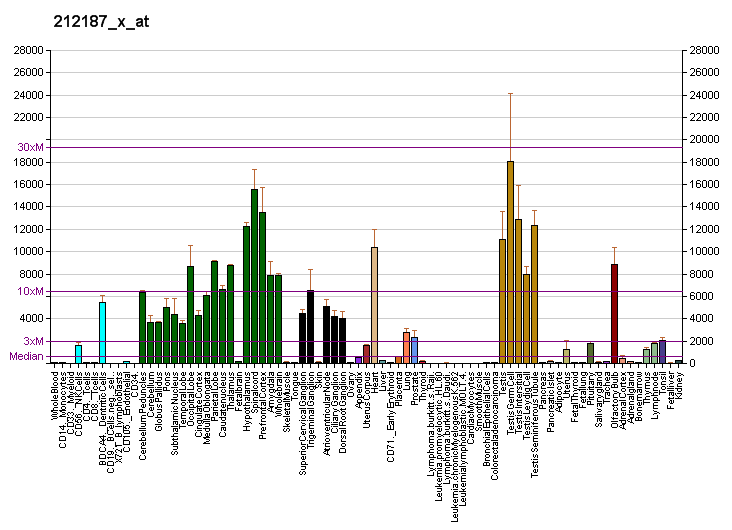
RNA expression pattern
Bgee	Human / Mouse (ortholog); Top expressed in: left testis; right testis; C1 segment; substantia nigra; putamen; apex of heart; right auricle of heart; temporal lobe; amygdala; caudate nucleus / Top expressed in: vestibular membrane of cochlear duct; olfactory tubercle; median eminence; arcuate nucleus; mammillary body; iris; optic nerve; pontine nuclei; retinal pigment epithelium; stria vascularis; More reference expression data
BioGPS	More reference expression data
Gene ontology
Molecular function	transporter activity; isomerase activity; fatty acid binding; prostaglandin-D synthase activity; protein binding; small molecule binding; retinoid binding
Cellular component	cytoplasm; Golgi apparatus; rough endoplasmic reticulum; nuclear membrane; endoplasmic reticulum membrane; membrane; extracellular region; endoplasmic reticulum; perinuclear region of cytoplasm; extracellular exosome; nucleus; extracellular space
Biological process	prostaglandin metabolic process; lipid metabolism; cyclooxygenase pathway; fatty acid metabolic process; fatty acid biosynthetic process; prostaglandin biosynthetic process; regulation of circadian sleep/wake cycle, sleep; transport
Sources:Amigo / QuickGO
Orthologs
Species	Human	Mouse
Entrez	5730	19215
Ensembl	ENSG00000107317	ENSMUSG00000015090
UniProt	P41222; Q5SQ11	O09114
RefSeq (mRNA)	NM_000954	NM_008963
RefSeq (protein)	NP_000945	NP_032989
Location (UCSC)	Chr 9: 136.98 – 136.98 Mb	Chr 2: 25.36 – 25.36 Mb
PubMed search
- Wikidata
View/Edit Human	View/Edit Mouse

Prostaglandin D2 synthase, also called Prostaglandin-H2 D-Isomerase is an enzyme that in humans is encoded by the PTGDS gene.

== Function ==
The protein encoded by this gene is a glutathione-independent prostaglandin-D synthase that catalyzes the conversion of prostaglandin H_{2} (PGH_{2}) to prostaglandin D_{2} (PGD_{2}). PGD_{2} functions as a neuromodulator as well as a trophic factor in the central nervous system. PGD_{2} is also involved in smooth muscle contraction/relaxation and is a potent inhibitor of platelet aggregation. This gene is preferentially expressed in brain. Studies with transgenic mice over-expressing this gene suggest that this gene may be also involved in the regulation of non-rapid eye movement sleep. Furthermore, PTGDS and its product PGD_{2} are elevated in the bald-scalp areas of men with male pattern baldness (androgenetic alopecia).

== Clinical use ==
Prostaglandin D_{2} synthase is used clinically as a diagnostic marker for liquorrhea, that is, to check whether fluid leaking from the nose or ear contains cerebrospinal fluid. This is important in the assessment of head trauma severity. In a medical context, the older term "beta-trace protein" is frequently used to refer to PTGDS.

== See also ==
- Hematopoietic prostaglandin D synthase
