= Prostaglandin D2 =

Names
- IUPAC name 9α,15S-Dihydroxy-11-oxo-prosta-5Z,13E-dien-1-oic acid

Identifiers
CAS Number	41598-07-6
3D model (JSmol)	Interactive image
ChEBI	CHEBI:15555
ChemSpider	395250
ECHA InfoCard	100.164.741
IUPHAR/BPS	1881; 1891
KEGG	C00696
MeSH	Prostaglandin+D2
PubChem CID	448457
UNII	RXY07S6CZ2
CompTox Dashboard (EPA)	DTXSID30897162
- InChI: InChI=1S/C20H32O5/c1-2-3-6-9-15(21)12-13-17-16(18(22)14-19(17)23)10-7-4-5-8-11-20(24)25/h4,7,12-13,15-18,21-22H,2-3,5-6,8-11,14H2,1H3,(H,24,25)/b7-4-,13-12+/t15-,16+,17+,18-/m0/s1 Key: BHMBVRSPMRCCGG-OUTUXVNYSA-N; InChI=1/C20H32O5/c1-2-3-6-9-15(21)12-13-17-16(18(22)14-19(17)23)10-7-4-5-8-11-20(24)25/h4,7,12-13,15-18,21-22H,2-3,5-6,8-11,14H2,1H3,(H,24,25)/b7-4-,13-12+/t15-,16+,17+,18-/m0/s1 Key: BHMBVRSPMRCCGG-OUTUXVNYBP
- SMILES: CCCCC[C@@H](/C=C/[C@@H]1[C@H]([C@H](CC1=O)O)C/C=C\CCCC(=O)O)O

Properties
Chemical formula	C_{20}H_{32}O_{5}
Molar mass	352.471 g·mol^{−1}
- Except where otherwise noted, data are given for materials in their standard state (at 25 °C [77 °F], 100 kPa). verify (what is ?) Infobox references

Prostaglandin D_{2} (or PGD_{2}) is a prostaglandin that binds to the receptor PTGDR (DP_{1}), as well as CRTH2 (DP_{2}). It is a major prostaglandin produced by mast cells – recruits Th2 cells, eosinophils, and basophils. It is the principle cyclooxygenase metabolite of arachidonic acid. In mammalian organs, large amounts of PGD_{2} are found only in the brain and in mast cells. It is critical to development of allergic diseases such as asthma. Research carried out in 1989 found PGD_{2} is the primary mediator of vasodilation (the "niacin flush") after ingestion of niacin (nicotinic acid).

A 2012 research paper indicates a causal link between elevated levels of localized PGD_{2} and hair growth inhibition. Applied topically, the researchers found PGD_{2} prevents hair growth, and mice that were genetically inclined to produce higher levels of PGD_{2} had inhibited hair growth. The researchers also found PGD_{2} levels were much higher in balding scalp tissue than nonbalding scalp tissue, through increased levels of prostaglandin D2 synthase. The paper suggested that inhibition of hair growth involved binding of PGD_{2} to a DP_{2} receptor, and that DP_{2} therefore would be a therapeutic target for androgenic alopecia in both men and women with hair loss and thinning. Because PGD_{2}'s relation to asthma has been known for several years, several drugs that seek to reduce the effect of PGD_{2} through blocking the DP_{2} are already in clinical trials.

== Production ==
- Cellular synthesis occurs through the arachidonic acid cascade with the final conversion from PGH_{2} done by PGD_{2} synthase (PTGDS).
- In the brain, production occurs via an alternative pathway through the soluble, secreted enzyme β-trace
- Following synthesis, it is most stable at a physiological pH as its conjugate base, the prostaglandin D2 anion.

== Effects ==
- PGD_{2} promotes bronchoconstriction and vasoconstriction during times of Inflammation to alert the host of danger. Its concentration in asthma patients is 10 times higher than in control patients, especially after it is brought into contact with allergens, air pollution, secondhand smoke and smoke.
- PGD2 is involved in the regulation of reducing body temperature in sleep, and acts opposite to PGE_{2}.
- PGD2 additionally inhibits platelet-activating factor, preventing platelets from clumping together during the inflammatory response.
- Elevated levels of PGD_{2} and PGD_{2} synthase in scalp hair follicles may be partially responsible for male pattern baldness.
- PGD_{2} also plays a part in male sexual development. It forms a feedforward loop with Sox9, which is activated by the SRY of the Y chromosome. PGD2, in a different feedforward loop than FGF9, helps keep the level of SOX9 high enough to activate other genes, such as Fgf9 and Sf1, which are necessary for the development of the male reproductive system.
- PGD_{2} plays a role in the attraction of neutrophils (chemotaxis).
- PGD_{2}-Adenosine system promotes sleep.
- The prostaglandin D2 receptor (PTGDR) gene encodes the specific receptor that PGD_{2} binds to in order to mediate inflammatory responses. The gene for PTGDR is located on Chromosome 14, in a region with other asthma and related atopic markers. This makes the receptor a key target in understanding genetic susceptibility to allergic diseases.

== Inhibitors ==
In silico simulations have predicted the following as potential inhibitors of PGD_{2} synthase:

- Acteoside
- Amentoflavone
- Ricinoleic acid
- Rutin
- Hinokiflavone
- Vitamin K and Vitamin D3 are natural inhibitors of Prostaglandin synthesis.

== See also ==
- PGD_{2} synthase
