= Prostacyclin receptor =

Mammalian protein found in Homo sapiens

PTGIR

Identifiers
- Aliases: PTGIR, IP, PRIPR, prostaglandin I2 (prostacyclin) receptor (IP), prostaglandin I2 receptor
- External IDs: OMIM: 600022; MGI: 99535; GeneCards: PTGIR
Available structures
PDB	Ortholog search: PDBe RCSB
PDB	List of PDB id codes 4F8K

Gene location (Human)
Chr.	Chromosome 19 (human)
Band	19q13.32	Start	46,620,468 bp
Band	19q13.32	End	46,625,089 bp

Gene location (Mouse)
Chr.	Chromosome 7 (mouse)
Band	7 A2|7 9.15 cM	Start	16,640,415 bp
Band	7 A2|7 9.15 cM	End	16,644,830 bp
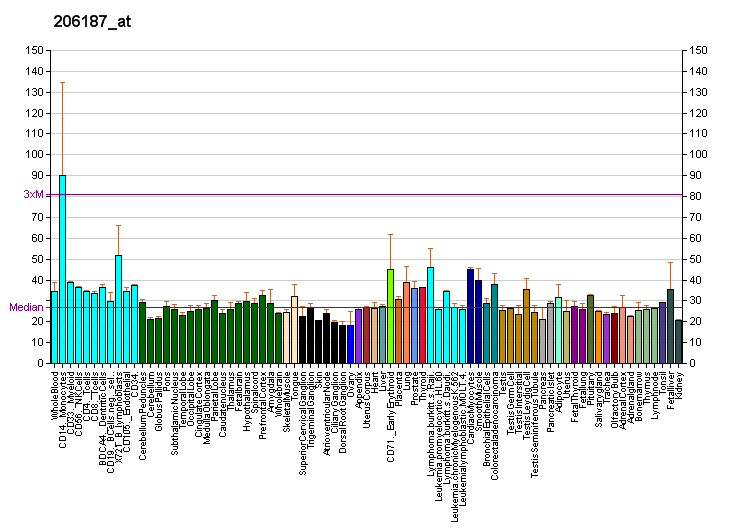
RNA expression pattern
Bgee	Human / Mouse (ortholog); Top expressed in: ascending aorta; Descending thoracic aorta; right coronary artery; left coronary artery; upper lobe of left lung; monocyte; tibial arteries; apex of heart; right auricle of heart; right lung / Top expressed in: lumbar spinal ganglion; granulocyte; blood; trigeminal ganglion; ankle; intercostal muscle; mesenteric lymph nodes; embryo; endothelial cell of lymphatic vessel; subcutaneous adipose tissue; More reference expression data
BioGPS	More reference expression data
Gene ontology
Molecular function	G protein-coupled receptor activity; signal transducer activity; guanyl-nucleotide exchange factor activity; prostacyclin receptor activity
Cellular component	integral component of membrane; cytosol; plasma membrane; integral component of plasma membrane; membrane
Biological process	negative regulation of platelet-derived growth factor receptor signaling pathway; cell-cell signaling; G protein-coupled receptor signaling pathway, coupled to cyclic nucleotide second messenger; response to lipopolysaccharide; negative regulation of smooth muscle cell proliferation; adenylate cyclase-activating G protein-coupled receptor signaling pathway; signal transduction; G protein-coupled receptor signaling pathway; inflammatory response; positive regulation of cytosolic calcium ion concentration
Sources:Amigo / QuickGO
Orthologs
Databases	NCBI: entry; OMA: entry
Species	Human	Mouse
Entrez	5739	19222
Ensembl	ENSG00000160013	ENSMUSG00000043017
UniProt	P43119	P43252
RefSeq (mRNA)	NM_000960	NM_008967
RefSeq (protein)	NP_000951	NP_032993
Location (UCSC)	Chr 19: 46.62 – 46.63 Mb	Chr 7: 16.64 – 16.64 Mb
PubMed search
- Wikidata
View/Edit Human	View/Edit Mouse

The prostacyclin receptor, also termed the prostaglandin I_{2} receptor or just IP, is a receptor belonging to the prostaglandin (PG) group of receptors. IP binds to and mediates the biological actions of prostacyclin (also termed prostaglandin I_{2}, PGI_{2}, or when used as a drug, epoprostenol). IP is encoded in humans by the PTGIR gene. While possessing many functions as defined in animal model studies, the major clinical relevancy of IP is as a powerful vasodilator: stimulators of IP are used to treat severe and even life-threatening diseases involving pathological vasoconstriction.

== Gene ==
The PTGIR gene is located on human chromosome 19 at position q13.32 (i.e. 19q13.32), contains 6 exons, and codes for a G protein coupled receptor (GPCR) of the rhodopsin-like receptor family, Subfamily A14 (see rhodopsin-like receptors#Subfamily A14).

== Expression ==
IP is most highly expressed in brain and thymus and is readily detected in most other tissues. It is found throughout the vascular network on endothelium and smooth muscle cells.

== Ligands ==
=== Agonists ===
Standard prostanoids have the following relative efficacies as receptor ligands in binding to and activating IP: PGI_{2}>>PGD2=PGE2=PGF2α>TXA2. In typical binding studies, PGI_{2} has one-half of its maximal binding capacity and cell-stimulating actions at ~1 nanomolar whereas the other prostaglandins are >50-fold to 100-fold weaker than this. However, PGI_{2} is very unstable, spontaneously converting to a far less active derivative 6-keto-PGF1 alpha within 1 minute of its formation. This instability makes defining the exact affinity of PGI_{2} for IP difficult. It also makes it important to have stable synthetic analogs of PGI_{2} for clinical usage. The most potent of these receptor agonists for binding to and activating IP are iloprost, taprostene, and esuberaprost which have K_{d} values (i.e. concentrations which bind to half of available IP receptors) in the low nanomole/liter range.

=== Antagonists ===
Several synthetic compounds bind to, but do not activate, IP and thereby inhibit its activation by the activating ligands just described. These receptor antagonists include RO1138452, RO3244794, TG6-129, and BAY-73-1449, all of which have K_{d} values for IP at or beneath low nanomol/liter levels.

== Mechanism of cell activation ==
IP is classified as a relaxant type of prostanoid receptor based on its ability, upon activation, to relax certain pre-contracted smooth muscle preparations and smooth muscle-containing tissues such as those of pulmonary arteries and veins. When bound to PGI_{2} or other of its agonists, IP stimulates one or more of three types of G protein complexes, depending on cell type: a) Gs alpha subunit-Gβγ complexes which release Gs that then stimulates adenyl cyclase to raise intracellular levels of cAMP and thereby activate cAMP-regulated protein kinases A-dependent cell signaling pathways (see PKA); b) Gq alpha subunit-Gβγ complexes which release Gq that then stimulates other cell signaling pathways (e.g. phospholipase C/IP3/cell Ca^{2+} mobilization/diacylglycerol/protein kinase Cs, calmodulin-modulated myosin light chain kinase, RAF/MEK/Mitogen-activated protein kinases, PKC/Ca^{2+}/Calcineurin/Nuclear factor of activated T-cells; and EGF cellular receptors; and c) Gi alpha subunit-Giβγ) complexes which releases Gi that then simulates phospholipase C to cleave phosphatidylinositol triphosphate into inositol triphosphate that raises intracellular CaCa^{2} levels thereby regulating Calcium signaling pathways and diacylglycerol that activates certain protein kinase C enzymes )that phosphorylate and thereby regulate target proteins involved in cell signaling (see Protein kinase C#Function). Studies suggest that stimulation of Gsβγ complexes is required for activation of the Gqβγ- and Giβγ-dependent pathways. In certain cells, activation of IP also stimulates G^{12}/G^{13}-Gβγ G proteins to activate the Rho family of GTPases signaling proteins and Gi-Gβγ G proteins to activateRaf/MEK/mitogen-activated kinase pathways.

== Function ==
Studies using animals genetically engineered to lack IP and examining the actions of EP4 receptor agonists in animals as well as animal and human tissues indicate that this receptor serves various functions. It has been regarded as the most successful therapeutic target among the 9 prostanoid receptors.

=== Platelets ===
IP gene knockout mice (i.e. IP(-/-) mice) exhibit increased tendency to thrombosis in response to experimentally-induced Endothelium, a result which appears to reflect, at least in part, the loss of IP's anti-platelet activity. IP activation of animal and human platelets inhibits their aggregation response and as one consequence of this inhibition of platelet-dependent blood clotting. The PGI_{2}-IP axis along with the production of nitric oxide, acting together additively and potentially synergistically, are powerful and physiological negative regulators of platelet function and thereby blood clotting in humans. Studies suggest that the PGI_{2}-IP axis is impaired in patients with a tendency to develop pathological thrombosis such as occurs in obesity, diabetes, and coronary artery disease.

=== Cardiovascular system ===
IP activation stimulates the dilation of arteries and veins in various animal models as well as in humans. It increases the blood flow through, for example, the pulmonary, coronary, retinal and choroid circulation. Inhaled PGI_{2} causes a modest fall in diastolic and small fall in systolic blood pressure in humans. This action involves IP's ability to relax vascular smooth muscle and is considered to be one of the fundamental functions of IP receptors. Furthermore, IP(-/-) mice on a high salt diet develop significantly higher levels of hypertension, cardiac fibrosis, and cardiac hypertrophy than control mice. The vasodilating and, perhaps, platelet-inhibiting effects of IP receptors likely underlie its ability suppress hypertension and protect tissues such as the heart in this model as well as the heart, brain, and gastrointestinal tract in various animal models of ischemic injury. Indeed, IP agonists are used to treat patients pathological vasoconstriction diseases. The injection of IP activators into the skin of rodents increases local capillary permeability and swelling; IP(-/-) mice fail to show this increased capillary permeability and swelling in response not only to IP activators but also in a model of carrageenan- or bradykinin-induced paw edema. IP antagonists likewise reduce experimentally-induced capillary permeability and swelling in rats. This actions is also considered a physiological function of IP receptors, but can contribute to the toxicity of IP activators in patients by inducing, for example, life-threatening pulmonary edema.

IP activators inhibit the adherence of circulating platelets and leukocytes adherence to vascular endothelium thereby blocking their entry into sites of tissue disturbance. The activators also inhibit vascular smooth muscle cells from proliferation by blocking these cells' growth cycle and triggering their apoptosis (i.e. cell death). These actions, along with its anti-inflammatory effects, may underlie the ability of IP gene knockout in an ApoE(−/−) mouse model to cause an accelerated rate of developing atherosclerosis.

=== Inflammation ===
Mouse studies indicate that the PGI_{2}-IP axis activates cellular signaling pathways that tend to suppress allergic inflammation. The axis inhibits bone marrow-derived dendritic cells (i.e. antigen-presenting cells that process antigen material, present it on their surfaces for delivery to T cells, and otherwise regulate innate and adaptive immune system responses) from producing pro-inflammatory cytokines (e.g. IL-12, TNF-alpha, IL-1-alpha, and IL-6) while stimulating them to increase production of the anti-inflammatory cytokine, IL-10. IP receptor activation of these cells also blocks their lipopolysaccharide-stimulated expression of pro-inflammatory cell surface proteins (i.e. CD86, CD40, and MHC class II molecules) that are critical for developing adaptive immune responses. IL receptor-activated bone marrow-derived dendritic cells showed a greatly reduced ability to stimulate the proliferation of T helper cell as well as the ability of these cells to produce pro-allergic cytokines (i.e. IL-5 and IL-13)s. In a mouse model of allergic inflammation, PGI_{2} reduced the maturation and migration of lung mature dendritic cells to Mediastinal lymph nodes while increasing the egress of immature dendritic cells away from the lung. These effects resulted in a decrease in allergen-induced responses of the cells mediating allergic reactivity, TH-2 cells. These IP-induced responses likely contribute to its apparent function in inhibiting certain mouse inflammation responses as exemplified by the failure of IP receptor deficient mice to develop full lung airway allergic responses to ovalbumin in a model of allergic inflammation.

In human studies, PGI_{2} failed to alter bronchoconstriction responses to allergen but did protect against exercise-induced and ultrasonic water-induced bronchoconstriction in asthmatic patients. It also caused bronchodilation in two asthmatic patients. However, these studies were done before the availability of potent and selective IP agonists. These agonists might produce more effective inhibitor results on airways allergic diseases but their toxicity (e.g. pulmonary edema, hypotension) has tended to restrict there study in asthmatic patients.

IP receptors also appear involved in suppressing non-allergic inflammatory responses. IP receptor-deficient mice exhibit a reduction in the extent and progression of inflammation in a model of collagen-induced arthritis. This effect may result from regulating the expression of arthritis-related, pro-inflammatory genes (i.e. those for IL-6, VEGF-A, and RANKL). On the other hand, IP receptors may serve to promote non-allergic inflammatory responses: IP receptor-deficient mice exhibited increased lung inflammation in a model of bleomycin-induced pulmonary fibrosis while mice made to over-express the PGI_{2}-forming enzyme, Prostacyclin synthase, in their airway epithelial cells were protected against lung injury in this model.

=== Pain perception ===
IP(-/-) mice exhibit little or no writhing responses in an acetic acid-induced pain model. The mouse IP receptor also appears to be involved in the development of heat-induced hyperalgesia. These and further studies using IP receptor antagonists in rats indicate that IP receptors on pain-perceiving sensory neurons of the dorsal root ganglia as well as on certain neurons in the spinal cord transmit signals for pain, particularly pain triggered by inflammation.

== Clinical significance ==
=== Toxicity ===
IP receptor agonists, particularly when used intravenously, have been associated with the rapid development of pulmonary edema, hypotension, bleeding due to inhibition of platelet aggregation, and tachycardia. Clinical use of these agonists is contraindicated in patients suffering many conditions. For example, the IP agonist iloprost is contraindicated in patients with unstable angina; decompensated cardiac failure (unless under close medical supervision); severe cardiac arrhythmias; congenital or acquired heart valve defects; increased risk of bleeding; a history of myocardial infarction in the past 6 months; or a history of cerebrovascular events (e.g. stroke) within 3 months.

=== Vasoconstriction ===
IP receptor agonists are front-line drugs to treat pulmonary hypertension. Major drugs in this category include PGI_{2} itself (i.e. epoprostenol), iloprost, treprostinil, and beraprost with epoprostenol being favored in some studies. However, newly developed IP agonists with favorable pharmacological features such as Selexipag have been granted by the US FDA orphan drug status for the treatment of pulmonary hypertension. IP agonists are also to treat severe vasoconstriction in Raynaud's disease, Raynaud's disease-like syndromes, and scleroderma. Epoprostenol causes improvements in hemodynamic parameters and oxygenation in patients suffering the acute respiratory distress syndrome but due to the limited number of randomized clinical trials and lack of studies investigating mortality, its use cannot be recommended as standard of care for this disease and should be reserved for those refractory to traditional therapies. A meta-analysis of 18 clinical trials on the use of prostanoids including principally IP receptor agonists on patients with severe lower limb peripheral artery disease due to diverse causes found that these drugs may reduce the extent of limb tissue that needed to be amputated. However, the studies did not support extensive use of prostanoids in patients with critical limb ischemia as an adjunct to revascularization or as an alternative to major amputation in cases that cannot undergo revascularization.

=== Thrombotic diseases ===
IP receptor agonists have been used to treat Thromboangiitis obliterans, a disease involving blood clotting and inflammation of the small and medium-sized arteries and veins in the hands and feet.

=== Genomic studies ===
An adenine (A) to cytosine (C) synonymous substitution at base 984 (i.e. A984C) in exon 3 of PTGIR' is the most frequent single nucleotide polymorphism (SNP) variant in a sampling of Japanese. This variant was associated with an increase in platelet activation responses in vitro and an increase in the incidence of cerebral ischemia. Two other synonymous SNP variants, V53V and S328S, in PTGIR in an Italian population study were associated with enhanced platelet activation response and deep vein thrombosis. The rare SNP variant 795C of 794T in the PTGIR gene is associated with an increased incidence of Aspirin-induced asthma and a greater percentage fall in the forced expiratory volume response of airways to inhalation of an aspirin like compound (lysine-acetyl salicylic acid) in a Korean population sample.

== See also ==
- PTGIR gene (https://www.wikigenes.org/e/gene/e/5739.html)
- PGI_{2}
- Prostaglandin receptors
- Eicosanoid receptor
