= Mediastinal lymph node =

Group of lymph nodes of the thorax

Mediastinal lymph nodes are lymph nodes located in the mediastinum.

== Pathology ==
- Mediastinal lymphadenopathy
- Mediastinal mass
