= Mediastinal lymphadenopathy =

Medical condition involving enlarged lymph nodes

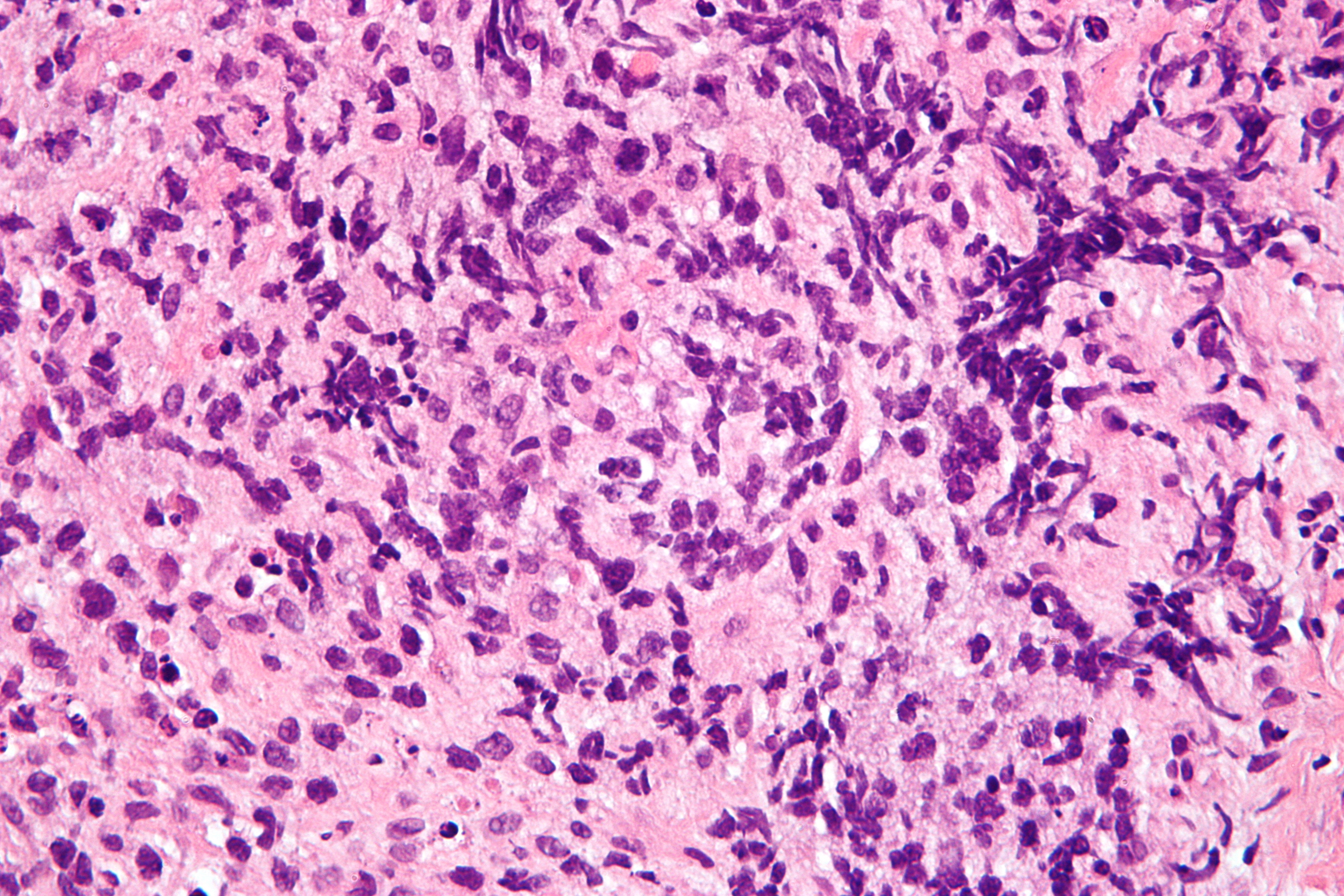
Micrograph of a primary mediastinal large B-cell lymphoma, a cause of mediastinal lymphadenopathy. H&E stain.

Mediastinal lymphadenopathy or mediastinal adenopathy is an enlargement of the mediastinal lymph nodes.

== Causes ==
There are many possible causes of mediastinal lymphadenopathy, including:

- Tuberculosis
- Sarcoidosis
- Lung cancer/oesophageal cancer
- Lymphangitis carcinomatosa
- Cystic fibrosis
- Histoplasmosis
- Acute lymphoblastic leukemia
- Coccidioidomycosis
- Lymphoma
- Whipple's disease
- Goodpasture syndrome
- Hypersensitivity pneumonitis

Inflammatory response to Silicone (leaked from ruptured implants) which has migrated and collected in mediastinal lymph nodes. Silicone mediastinal lymphadenopathy.

== See also ==
- Lymphadenopathy
- Mediastinum
- Mediastinal lymph node
- Mediastinal mass
- Neoplasia
