= Prostacyclin synthase =

Enzyme found in humans

prostaglandin-I synthase
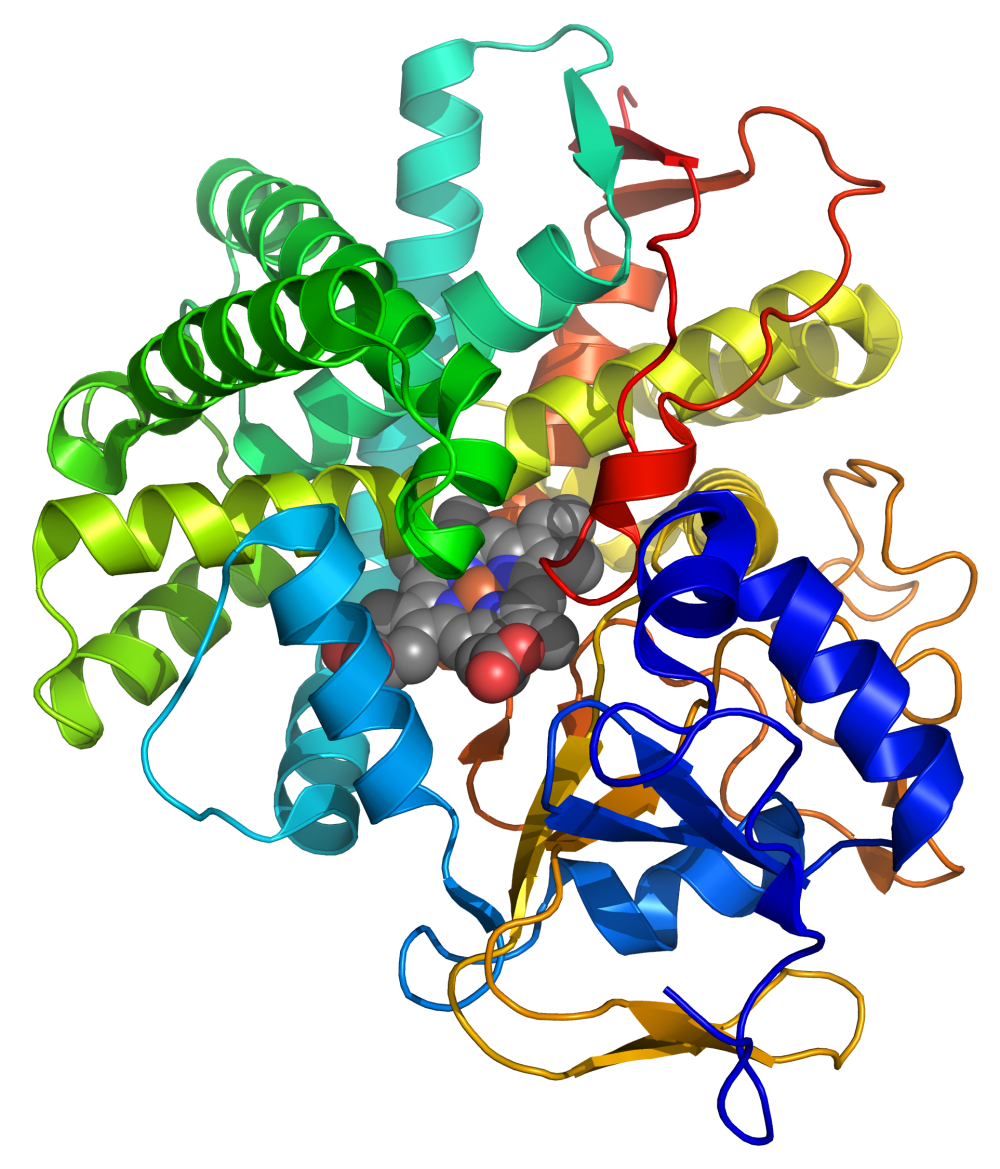
- Cartoon diagram of human prostacyclin synthase. Heme group visible at center. From PDB: 2IAG

Identifiers
- EC no.: 5.3.99.4
- CAS no.: 65802-86-0

Databases
- BRENDA: enzyme data
- ExPASy: NiceZyme view
- KEGG: enzyme entry
- MetaCyc: metabolic pathway
- Rhea: reactions
- PDB structures: RCSB PDB PDBe PDBsum
- Gene Ontology: AmiGO / QuickGO
Search
- PMC: articles
- PubMed: articles
- NCBI: proteins

PTGIS
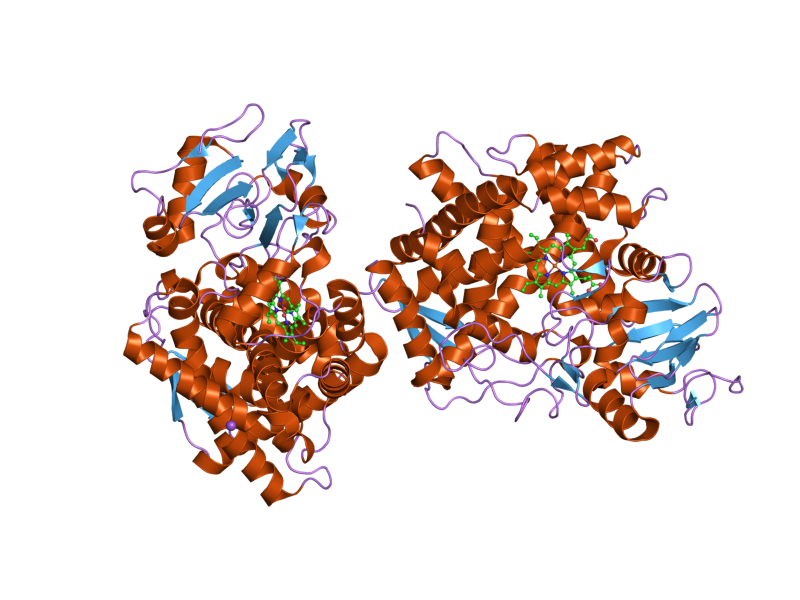

Identifiers
- Aliases: PTGIS, CYP8, CYP8A1, PGIS, PTGI, prostaglandin I2 (prostacyclin) synthase, prostaglandin I2 synthase
- External IDs: OMIM: 601699; MGI: 1097156; GeneCards: PTGIS
Available structures
PDB	Ortholog search: PDBe RCSB
PDB	List of PDB id codes 3B6H, 2IAG
Enzyme activity
EC #	BRENDA	ExPASy	KEGG	MetaCyc
4.2.1.152	↗	↗	↗	↗
5.3.99.4	↗	↗	↗	↗

Gene location (Human)
Chr.	Chromosome 20 (human)
Band	20q13.13	Start	49,503,874 bp
Band	20q13.13	End	49,568,137 bp
RNA expression pattern
Bgee	Human / Mouse (ortholog); Top expressed in: parietal pleura; right coronary artery; saphenous vein; pericardium; left uterine tube; Descending thoracic aorta; ascending aorta; germinal epithelium; left coronary artery; vena cava / n/a; More reference expression data
BioGPS	n/a
Gene ontology
Molecular function	iron ion binding; isomerase activity; metal ion binding; monooxygenase activity; protein binding; heme binding; oxidoreductase activity, acting on paired donors, with incorporation or reduction of molecular oxygen; prostaglandin-I synthase activity
Cellular component	cytoplasm; integral component of membrane; endoplasmic reticulum membrane; membrane; caveola; nucleus; endoplasmic reticulum; extracellular space
Biological process	prostaglandin metabolic process; positive regulation of execution phase of apoptosis; cellular response to interleukin-6; lipid metabolism; icosanoid metabolic process; cyclooxygenase pathway; fatty acid metabolic process; positive regulation of angiogenesis; fatty acid biosynthetic process; negative regulation of nitric oxide biosynthetic process; decidualization; cellular response to interleukin-1; positive regulation of peroxisome proliferator activated receptor signaling pathway; apoptotic signaling pathway; negative regulation of NF-kappaB transcription factor activity; negative regulation of inflammatory response; cellular response to hypoxia; embryo implantation; prostaglandin biosynthetic process; NAD biosynthesis via nicotinamide riboside salvage pathway
Sources:Amigo / QuickGO
Orthologs
Databases	NCBI: entry; OMA: entry
Species	Human	Mouse
Entrez	5740	19223
Ensembl	ENSG00000124212	n/a
UniProt	Q16647	O35074
RefSeq (mRNA)	NM_000961	NM_008968
RefSeq (protein)	NP_000952	NP_032994
Location (UCSC)	Chr 20: 49.5 – 49.57 Mb	n/a
PubMed search
- Wikidata
View/Edit Human	View/Edit Mouse

Prostaglandin-I synthase (EC 5.3.99.4) also known as prostaglandin I2 (prostacyclin) synthase (PTGIS) or CYP8A1 is an enzyme involved in prostanoid biosynthesis that in humans is encoded by the PTGIS gene. This enzyme belongs to the family of cytochrome P450 isomerases.

== Function ==
This gene encodes a member of the cytochrome P450 superfamily of enzymes. The cytochrome P450 proteins are monooxygenases which catalyze many reactions involved in drug metabolism and synthesis of cholesterol, steroids and other lipids. However, this protein is considered a member of the cytochrome P450 superfamily on the basis of sequence similarity rather than functional similarity. This endoplasmic reticulum membrane protein catalyzes the conversion of prostaglandin H_{2} to prostacyclin (prostaglandin I_{2}), a potent vasodilator and inhibitor of platelet aggregation. An imbalance of prostacyclin and its physiological antagonist thromboxane A_{2} contribute to the development of myocardial infarction, stroke, and atherosclerosis.

Unlike most P450 enzymes, PGIS does not require molecular oxygen (O_{2}). Instead it uses its heme cofactor to catalyze the isomerization of prostaglandin H_{2} to prostacyclin. Prostaglandin H_{2} is produced by cyclooxygenase in the first committed step of prostaglandin biosynthesis.

== Nomenclature ==
The systematic name of this enzyme class is (5Z,13E)-(15S)-9alpha,11alpha-epidioxy-15-hydroxyprosta-5,13-dienoate 6-isomerase. Other names in common use include prostacyclin synthase, prostacyclin synthetase, prostagladin I_{2} synthetase, PGI_{2} synthase, PGIS, PTGIS, and PGI_{2} synthetase.

== Pathways ==
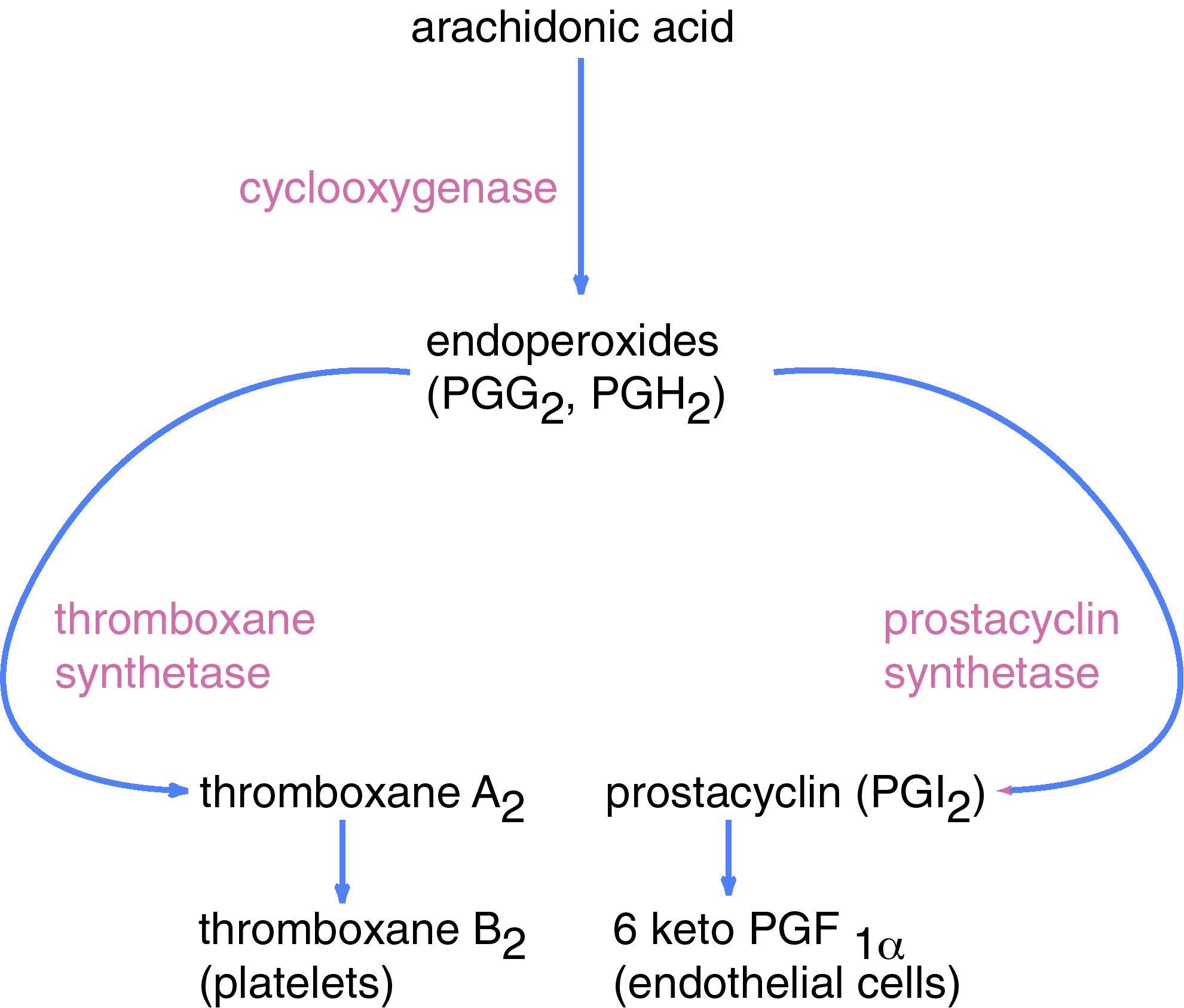
Thromboxane synthesis

Eicosanoid synthesis.

== Molecular interactions ==
Generally, protein–protein interactions play crucial roles and are critical for formation of protein microenvironment, cell signaling and direct regulation of the activity of metabolic enzymes. Information on tissue-specific spectrum of molecular interactions of prostacyclin synthase will be useful for subnetwork analysis of PTGIS. Following proteins became known as potential direct binders of PTGIS: CYP2J2, GST, GSTA1, GLRX3, AKR1A1. Protein–protein and protein-peptide interactions were experimentally verified using surface plasmon resonance technology.

== See also ==
- Prostanoid
