= Prostacyclin =

Chemical compound

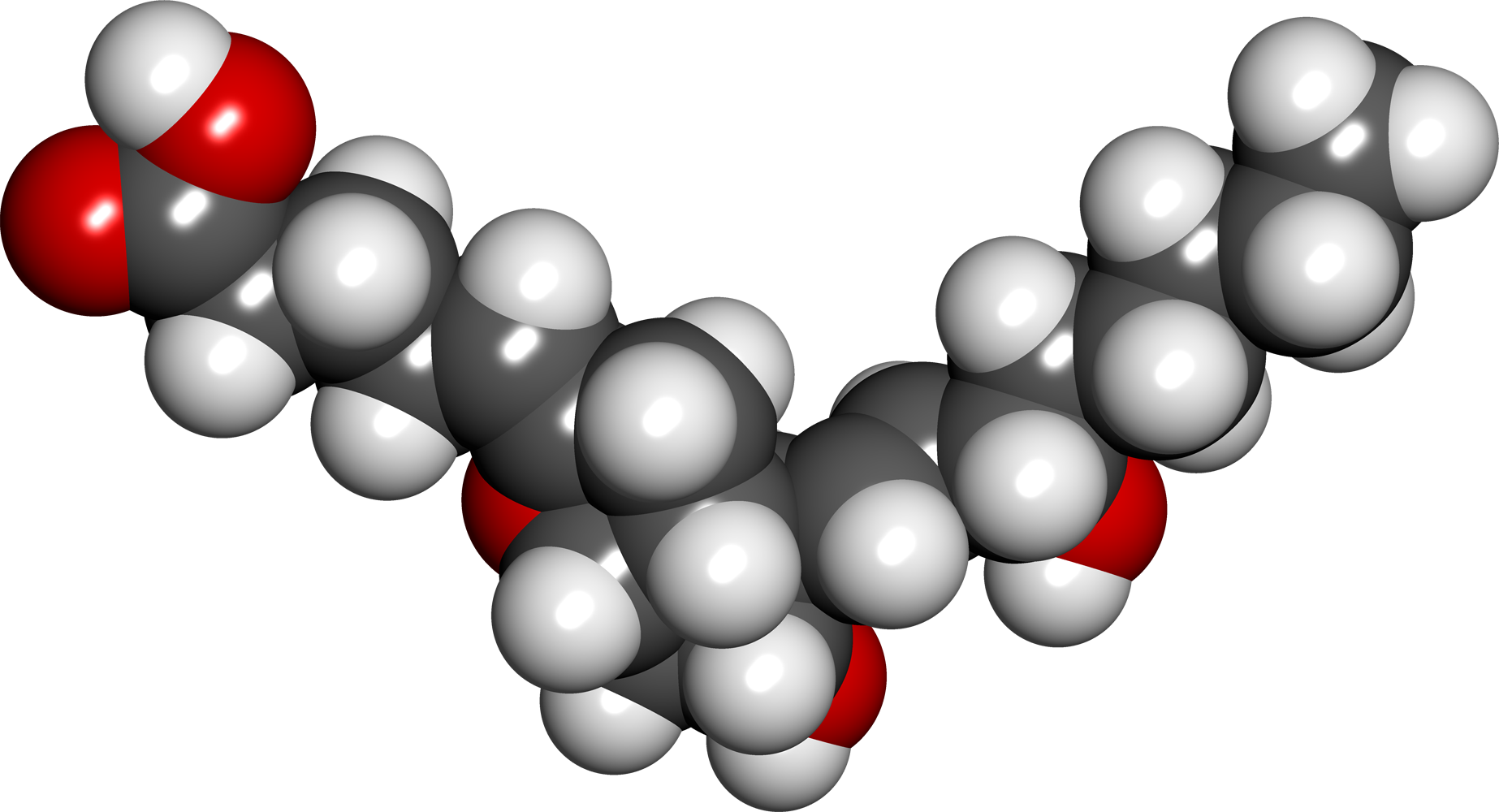

Clinical data
- Trade names: Flolan, others
- AHFS/Drugs.com: Monograph
- License data: US DailyMed: Epoprostenol_sodium
- Pregnancy category: AU: B1
- ATC code: B01AC09 (WHO)

Legal status
- Legal status: AU: S4 (Prescription only); US: ℞-only

Pharmacokinetic data
- Elimination half-life: 42 seconds

Identifiers
- IUPAC name: (Z)-5-[(4R,5R)-5-Hydroxy-4-((S,E)-3-hydroxyoct-1-enyl)hexahydro-2H-cyclopenta[b]furan-2-ylidene]pentanoic acid
- CAS Number: 35121-78-9
- PubChem CID: 5282411
- IUPHAR/BPS: 1915
- DrugBank: DB01240
- ChemSpider: 102770
- UNII: DCR9Z582X0
- KEGG: D00106; as salt: D01337
- ChEMBL: ChEMBL1139
- CompTox Dashboard (EPA): DTXSID5022988

Chemical and physical data
- Formula: C_{20}H_{32}O_{5}
- Molar mass: 352.471 g·mol^{−1}
- 3D model (JSmol): Interactive image
- SMILES: OC(=O)CCC\C=C1\C[C@@H]2[C@@H](/C=C/[C@@H](O)CCCCC)[C@H](O)C[C@@H]2O1
- InChI: InChI=1S/C20H32O5/c1-2-3-4-7-14(21)10-11-16-17-12-15(8-5-6-9-20(23)24)25-19(17)13-18(16)22/h8,10-11,14,16-19,21-22H,2-7,9,12-13H2,1H3,(H,23,24)/b11-10+,15-8-/t14-,16+,17+,18+,19-/m0/s1; Key:KAQKFAOMNZTLHT-OZUDYXHBSA-N

Prostacyclin (also called prostaglandin I_{2} or PGI_{2}) is a prostaglandin member of the eicosanoid family of lipid molecules. It inhibits platelet activation and is also an effective vasodilator.

When used as a drug, it is also known as epoprostenol. The terms are sometimes used interchangeably.

== Function ==
Prostacyclin chiefly prevents formation of the platelet plug involved in primary hemostasis (a part of blood clot formation). It does this by inhibiting platelet activation. It is also an effective vasodilator. Prostacyclin's interactions contrast with those of thromboxane (TXA_{2}), another eicosanoid. Both molecules are derived from arachidonic acid, and work together with opposite platelet aggregatory effects. These strongly suggest a mechanism of cardiovascular homeostasis between these two hormones in relation to vascular damage.

== Medical uses ==
It is used to treat pulmonary arterial hypertension (PAH), pulmonary fibrosis, as well as atherosclerosis. In pediatric practice, prostacyclin is commonly used to maintain patency of the ductus arteriosus. Prostacyclins are given to people with class III or class IV PAH.

== Degradation ==
Prostacyclin, which has a half-life of 42 seconds, is broken down into 6-keto-PGF_{1}, which is a much weaker vasodilator. A way to stabilize prostacyclin in its active form, especially during drug delivery, is to prepare prostacyclin in alkaline buffer. Even at physiological pH, prostacyclin can rapidly form the inactive hydration product 6-keto-prostaglandin F1α.

== Mechanism ==
Prostacyclin effect		Mechanism	Cellular response
Classical functions	Vessel tone	↑cAMP, ↓ET-1 ↓Ca^{2+}, ↑K^{+}	↓SMC proliferation ↑Vasodilation
Classical functions	Antiproliferative	↑cAMP ↑PPARgamma	↓Fibroblast growth ↑Apoptosis
Classical functions	Antithrombotic	↓Thromboxane-A2 ↓PDGF	↓Platelet aggregation ↓Platelet adherence to vessel wall
Novel functions	Antiinflammatory	↓IL-1, IL-6 ↑IL-10	↓Proinflammatory cytokines ↑Antiinflammatory cytokines
Novel functions	Antimitogenic	↓VEGF ↓TGF-β	↓Angiogenesis ↑ECM remodeling

As mentioned above, prostacyclin (PGI_{2}) is released by healthy endothelial cells and performs its function through a paracrine signaling cascade that involves G protein-coupled receptors on nearby platelets and endothelial cells. The platelet Gs protein-coupled receptor (prostacyclin receptor) is activated when it binds to PGI_{2}. This activation, in turn, signals adenylyl cyclase to produce cAMP. cAMP goes on to inhibit any undue platelet activation (in order to promote circulation) and also counteracts any increase in cytosolic calcium levels that would result from thromboxane A2 (TXA_{2}) binding (leading to platelet activation and subsequent coagulation). PGI_{2} also binds to endothelial prostacyclin receptors, and in the same manner, raises cAMP levels in the cytosol. This cAMP then goes on to activate protein kinase A (PKA). PKA then continues the cascade by promoting the phosphorylation of the myosin light chain kinase, which inhibits it and leads to smooth muscle relaxation and vasodilation. It can be noted that PGI_{2} and TXA_{2} work as physiological antagonists.

== Members ==
PROSTACYCLINS			
Flolan (epoprostenol sodium) for Injection	Continuously infused	2 ng/kg/min to start, increased by 2 ng/kg/min every 15 minutes or longer until suitable efficacy/tolerability balance is achieved	Class III; Class IV
Veletri (epoprostenol) for Injection	Continuously infused	2 ng/kg/min to start, increased by 2 ng/kg/min every 15 minutes or longer until suitable efficacy/tolerability balance is achieved	Class III; Class IV
Remodulin SC§ (treprostinil sodium); Injection	Continuously infused	1.25 ng/kg/min to start, increased by up to 1.25 ng/kg/min per week for 4 weeks, then up to 2.5 ng/kg/min per week until suitable efficacy/tolerability balance is achieved	Class II; Class III; Class IV
Ventavis (iloprost); Inhalation Solution	Inhaled 6–9 times daily	2.5 μg 6–9 times daily to start, increased to 5.0 μg 6–9 times daily if well tolerated	Class III; Class IV

== Pharmacology ==
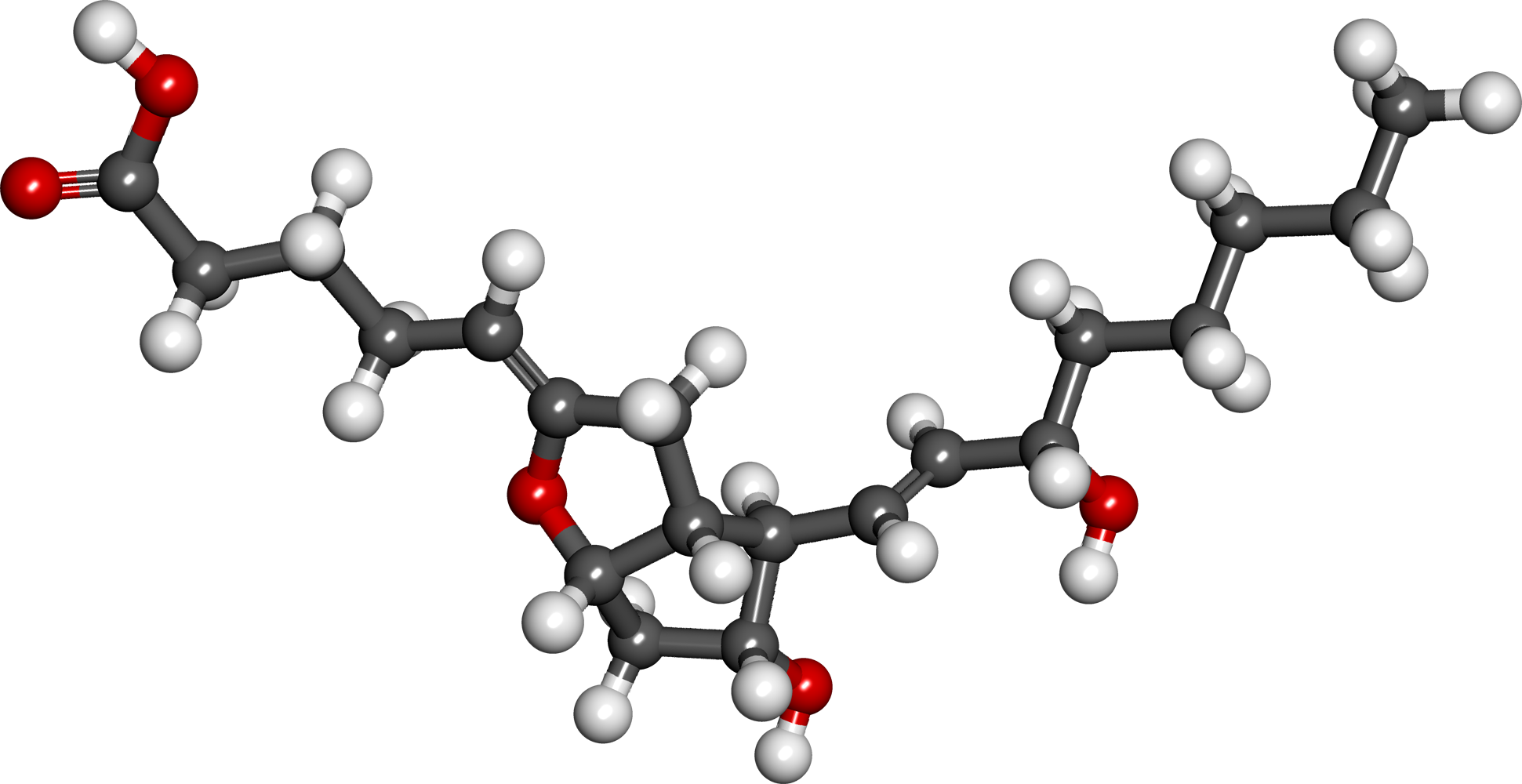
Ball-and-stick model of prostacyclin

Synthetic prostacyclin analogues (iloprost, cisaprost) are used intravenously, subcutaneously or by inhalation:

- as a vasodilator in severe Raynaud's phenomenon or ischemia of a limb;
- in pulmonary hypertension.
- in primary pulmonary hypertension (PPH)

The production of prostacyclin is inhibited by the action of NSAIDs on cyclooxygenase enzymes COX1 and COX2. These convert arachidonic acid to prostaglandin H2 (PGH_{2}), the immediate precursor of prostacyclin. Since thromboxane (an eicosanoid stimulator of platelet aggregation) is also downstream of COX enzymes, one might think that the effect of NSAIDs would act to balance. However, prostacyclin concentrations recover much faster than thromboxane levels, so aspirin administration initially has little to no effect but eventually prevents platelet aggregation (the effect of prostaglandins predominates as they are regenerated). This is explained by understanding the cells that produce each molecule, TXA_{2} and PGI_{2}. Since PGI_{2} is primarily produced in a nucleated endothelial cell, the COX inhibition by NSAID can be overcome with time by increased COX gene activation and subsequent production of more COX enzymes to catalyze the formation of PGI_{2}. In contrast, TXA_{2} is released primarily by anucleated platelets, which are unable to respond to NSAID COX inhibition with additional transcription of the COX gene because they lack DNA material necessary to perform such a task. This allows NSAIDs to result in PGI_{2} dominance that promotes circulation and retards thrombosis.

In patients with pulmonary hypertension, inhaled epoprostenol reduces pulmonary pressure, and improves right ventricular stroke volume in patients undergoing cardiac surgery. A dose of 60 μg is hemodynamically safe, and its effect is completely reversed after 25 minutes. No evidence of platelet dysfunction or an increase in surgical bleeding after administration of inhaled epoprostenol has been found. The drug has been known to cause flushing, headaches and hypotension.

== Synthesis ==
=== Biosynthesis ===
Eicosanoid synthesis. (Prostacyclin near bottom center.)

Prostacyclin is produced in endothelial cells, which line the walls of arteries and veins, from prostaglandin H_{2} (PGH_{2}) by the action of the enzyme prostacyclin synthase. Although prostacyclin is considered an independent mediator, it is called PGI_{2} (prostaglandin I_{2}) in eicosanoid nomenclature, and is a member of the prostanoids (together with the prostaglandins and thromboxane). PGI_{2}, derived primarily from COX-2 in humans, is the major arachidonate metabolite released from the vascular endothelium. This is a controversial point, some assign COX 1 as the major prostacyclin producing cyclooxygenase in the endothelial cells of the blood vessels.

The series-3 prostaglandin PGH_{3} also follows the prostacyclin synthase pathway, yielding another prostacyclin, PGI_{3}. The unqualified term 'prostacyclin' usually refers to PGI_{2}. PGI_{2} is derived from the ω-6 arachidonic acid. PGI_{3} is derived from the ω-3 EPA.

=== Artificial synthesis ===
Prostacyclin can be synthesized from the methyl ester of prostaglandin F_{2α}. After its synthesis, the drug is reconstituted in saline and glycerin.

Because prostacyclin is so chemically labile, quantitation of their inactive metabolites, rather than the active compounds, is used to assess their rate of synthesis.

== History ==
During the 1960s, a UK research team, headed by Professor John Vane, began to explore the role of prostaglandins in anaphylaxis and respiratory diseases. Working with a team from the Royal College of Surgeons, Vane discovered that aspirin and other oral anti-inflammatory drugs work by inhibiting the synthesis of prostaglandins. This critical finding opened the door to a broader understanding of the role of prostaglandins in the body.

A team at The Wellcome Foundation led by Salvador Moncada had identified a lipid mediator they called "PG-X," which inhibits platelet aggregation. PG-X, later known as prostacyclin, is 30 times more potent than any other then-known anti-aggregatory agent. They did this while searching for an enzyme that generates a fellow unstable prostanoid, Thromboxane A2

In 1976, Vane and fellow researchers Salvador Moncada, Ryszard Gryglewski, and Stuart Bunting published the first paper on prostacyclin in Nature. The collaboration produced a synthesized molecule, which was named epoprostenol. But, as with native prostacyclin, the epoprostenol molecule is unstable in solution and prone to rapid degradation. This presented a challenge for both in vitro experiments and clinical applications.

To overcome this challenge, the research team that discovered prostacyclin continued the research. The research team synthesized nearly 1,000 analogues.
