= Mediastinal tumors =

A mediastinal tumor is a tumor in the mediastinum, the cavity that separates the lungs from the rest of the chest. It extends from the sternum to the spinal column. It contains the heart, esophagus, trachea, thymus, and aorta.

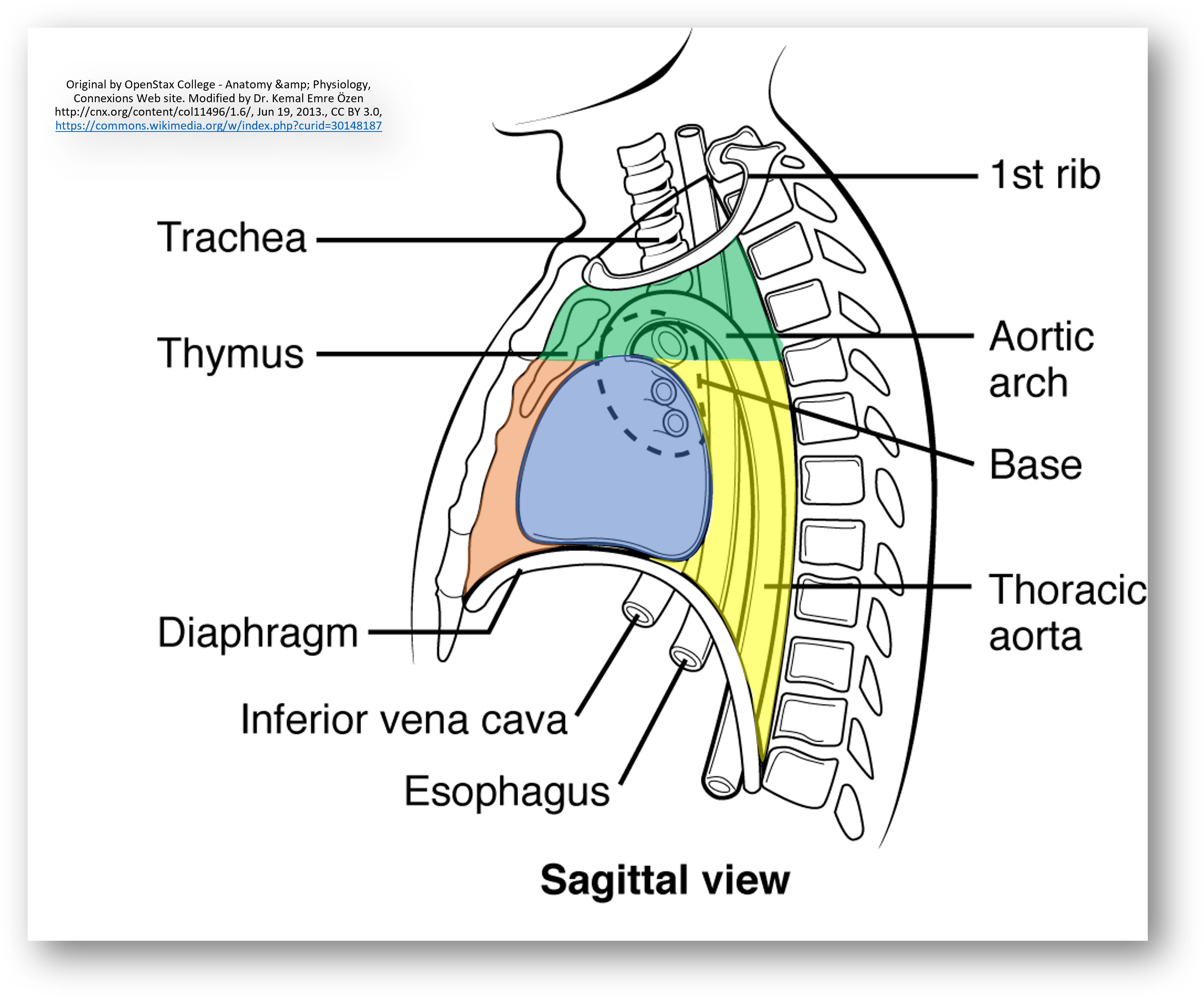
This diagram illustrates the compartments of the mediastinum in relation to anatomic structures. Orange: Anterior mediastinum, Blue: Middle mediastinum, Yellow: Posterior mediastinum

The mediastinum has three main parts: the anterior mediastinum (front), the middle mediastinum, and the posterior mediastinum (back). Tumors in the anterior portion of the mediastinum can include thymoma, lymphoma, germ cell tumors including teratoma, thyroid tissue, and parathyroid lesions. Masses in this area are more likely to be malignant than those in other compartments. Middle mediastinal tumors are less common and refer to cardiac or neurogenic tumors. Masses in the posterior portion of the mediastinum tend to be neurogenic in origin, and in adults tend to be of neural sheath origin including shwannomas and neurofibromas.

The most common mediastinal masses are thymoma (20% of mediastinal tumors), usually found in the anterior mediastinum, followed by neurogenic tumor (15–20%) located in the anterior mediastinum. Adults usually present with cancers of the anterior mediastinum and children usually present with cancers of the posterior mediastinum.

Other conditions that can cause mediastinal enlargement includes aortic aneurysms, lymphadenopathy, cysts, inflammation, and abscesses. Mediastinal tumors were first described by Ibn Zuhr (Avenzoar).

== Types ==
=== Anterior Mediastinal Tumors ===
50% of mediastinal masses occur in the anterior compartment. The most common anterior masses are commonly known by the '4 T's' which refer to thymomas, teratomas, thyroid tissue and 'terrible' lymphomas. 35% of tumors in this region are thymic malignancies, 25% are lymphomas, 10% are benign teratomas, 15% are endocrine and thyroid tumors and the remaining portion are malignant germ cell tumors and benign thymic lesions.

==== Thymic carcinoma and thymoma ====
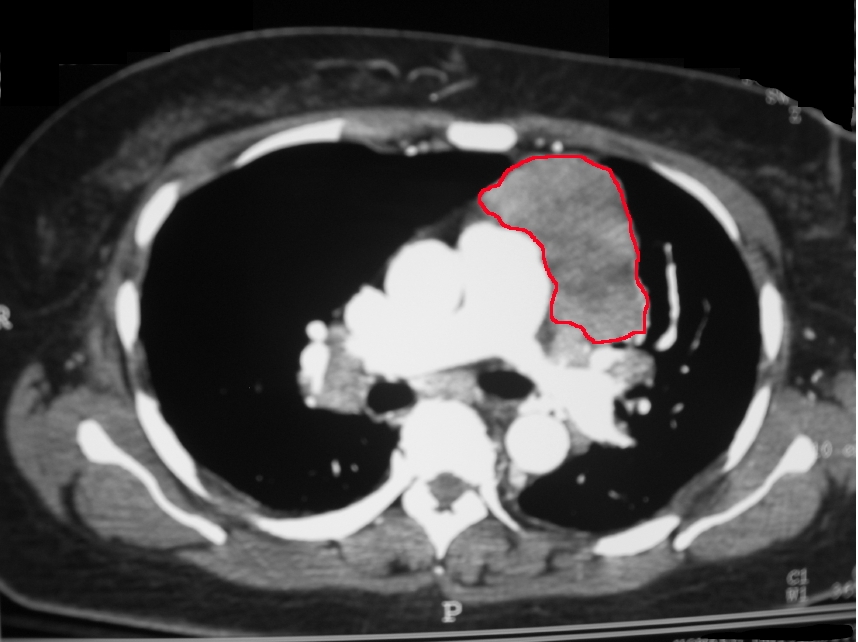
This is a chest CT. The structure outlined in red represents a thymoma in the left anterior mediastinum.

The thymus is a lymphatic organ in the anterior mediastinum where lymphocytes, immune system cells, are produced and matured. It is most prominent in infants and begins to involute at 1 year of age. Tumors of this organ are the most common primary anterior mediastinal tumor, comprising 20% of all mediastinal cancers. Thymomas and thymic carcinomas most commonly occur between ages 40 and 60 and only rarely occur in children. Patients usually initially present with an incidental finding on imaging, symptoms due to compressive effects or symptoms due to an associated paraneoplastic syndrome such as myasthenia gravis. Half of patients with a thymoma are found to have myasthenia gravis, an autoimmune disorder presenting with diplopia, ptosis, dysphagia, weakness or fatigue.

Both thymic tumors originate from thymic epithelial cells. Under microscope, thymomas have lobulations with bands of fibrous stroma, while thymic carcinomas lack lobulated architecture and have more cystic and necrotic changes. Thymomas can develop into carcinomas, although this only occurs after about a decade. Diagnosis is achieved through CT or MRI of the chest, which can differentiate between other mediastinal masses. Treatment may include chemoradiotherapy, immunotherapy, and/or surgical resection.

==== Lymphoma ====
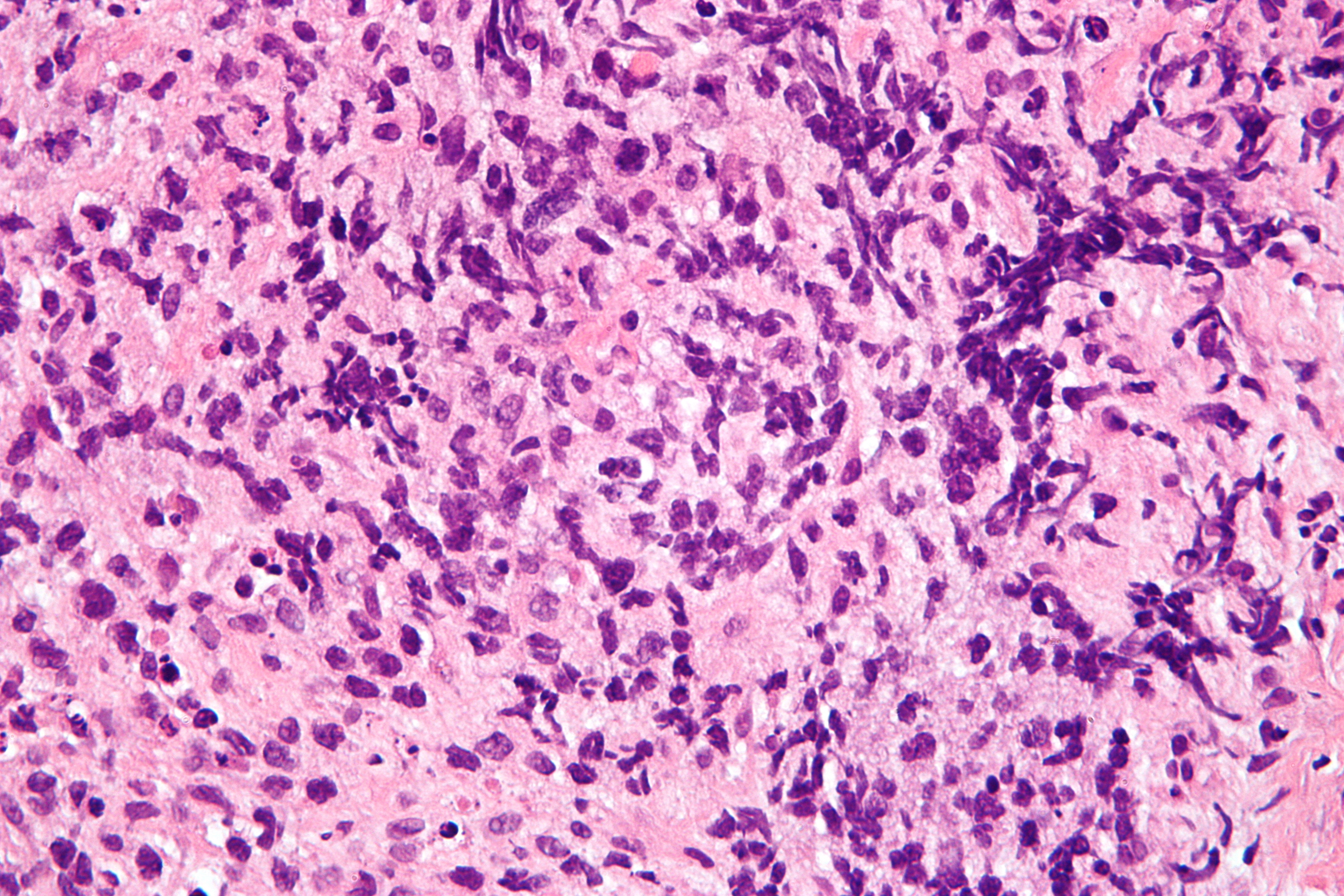
Micrograph of a primary mediastinal large B-cell lymphoma, a rare type of lymphoma that arises in the mediastinum. H&E stain.

Lymphomas comprise 15% of primary mediastinal masses and 45% of anterior mediastinal masses in children. The most common are nodular sclerosing Hodgkin lymphoma, primary mediastinal large B-cell lymphoma and lymphoblastic lymphoma. Most are seen in the anterior compartment and rest are seen in middle compartment. Hodgkin's lymphoma usually present in 40–50's with nodular sclerosing type (7), and non-Hodgkin's appears in all age groups. There is also primary mediastinal B-cell lymphoma with exceptionally good prognosis.

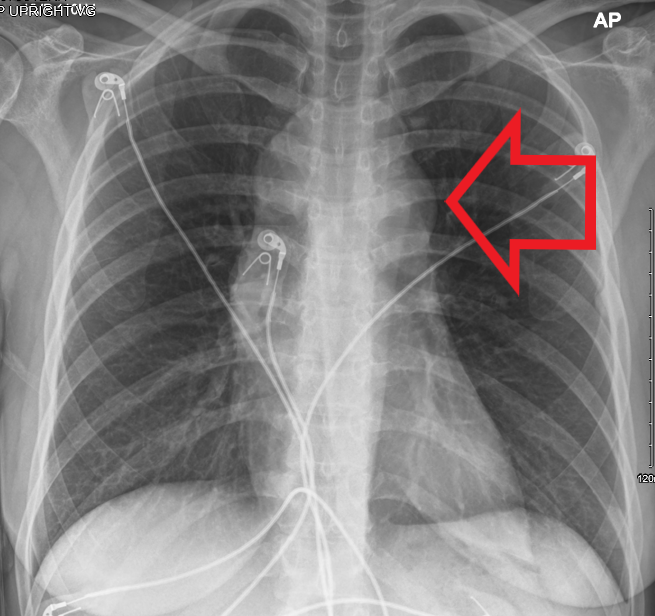
This chest x-ray demonstrates a widened mediastinum due to lymphoma.

Common symptoms of a mediastinal lymphoma of include fever, weight loss, night sweats, and compressive symptoms such as pain, dyspnea, wheezing, superior vena cava syndrome, and pleural effusions. Diagnosis is usually by CT or MRI showing lobulated mass. Confirmation done by tissue biopsy of accompanying nodes if any, mediastinoscopy, mediastinotomy, or thoracotomy. FNA biopsy is usually not adequate. Treatment of mediastinal Hodgkin's involves chemotherapy and/or radiation. Prognosis is variable and dependent on the lymphoma type and staging. Stage 1 and 2a Hodgkin lymphoma has a good prognosis with 5-year overall survival of 90%.

==== Germ cell tumors ====
Germ cell tumors comprise 15% of mediastinal masses and usually affect young adult men between the ages of 18 and 29. These are rare tumors that develop from reproductive cells that grow in the chest instead of the gonads during early development. These tumors resemble testicular germ cell tumors and are classified into three types: teratomas, seminomas, and non-seminomatous tumors such as yolk sac tumors or embryonal carcinomas. Benign teratomas are the most common subtype and may contain tissue such as hair, teeth and bone. Teratomas can rarely be malignant if they are characterized by biopsy as immature with 3 germ layers. Seminomas and nonseminomatous GCTs are rare and malignant.

Teratoma histology
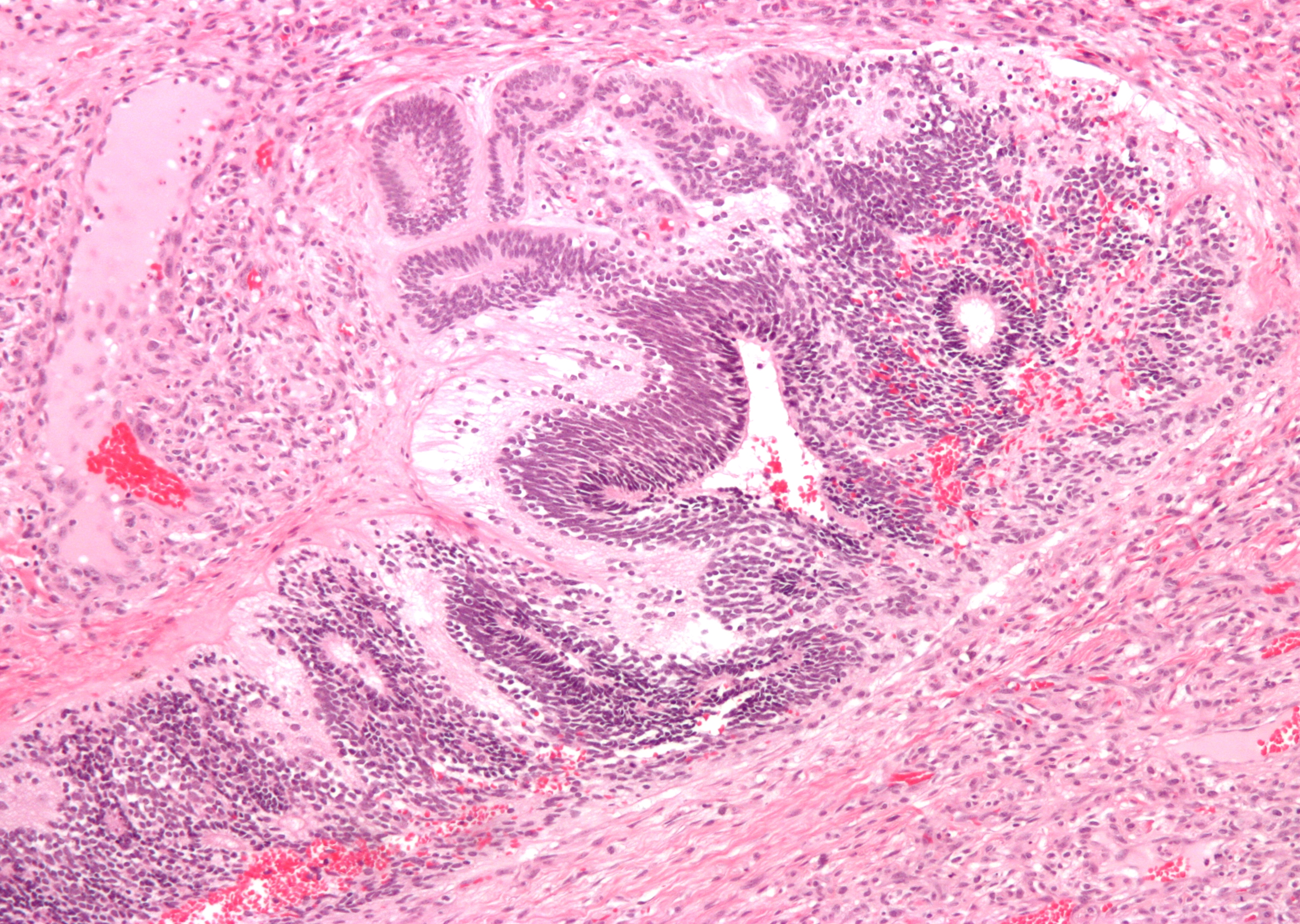
- Micrograph of the primitive neuroepithelium of an immature teratoma of the mediastinum. H&E stain.
- Specialty: Oncology

Tumors are initially asymptomatic but may cause chest pain, cough, or shortness of breath when the size causes compression on surrounding structures. The tumor is diagnosed by CT and MRI scans as well as blood markers like AFP, β-hCG and LDH that help classify the type of germ cell tumor. Most teratomas are benign tumors but require close follow-up and treatment. Teratomas are associated with Klinefelter syndrome.Teratomas are usually noncancerous and treated with surgery, while seminomas and non-seminomatous tumors are more aggressive and treated with chemotherapy and surgery. The outlook depends on the tumor classification, with seminomas and teratomas having excellent prognosis and non-seminomatous tumors having a higher chance of metastasis.

==== Thyroid and parathyroid tumors ====
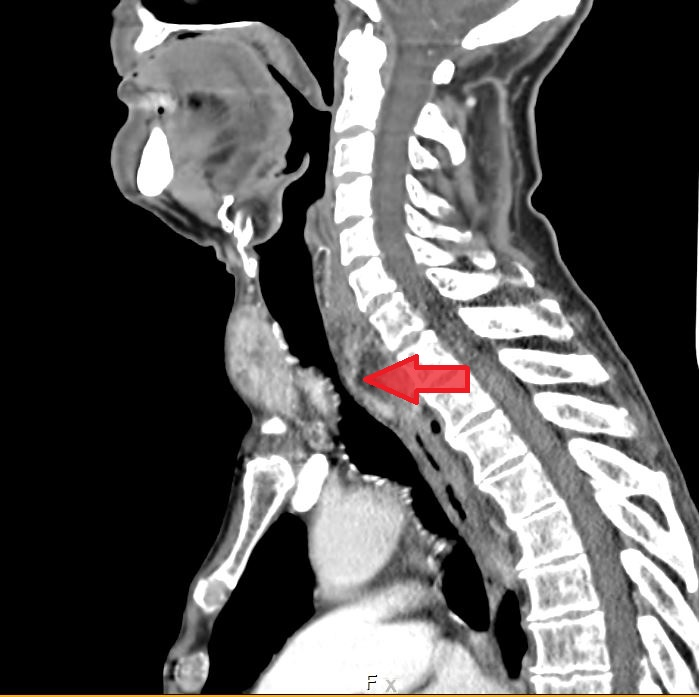
This sagittal CT scan of the neck and chest demonstrates a thyroid goiter causing compression of the trachea. This may cause difficulty breathing.

While the thyroid and parathyroid are usually located in the neck, they can grow large enough to extend inferiorly and present as mediastinal masses. This is sometimes referred to as a substernal or retrosternal goiter. Alternatively, thyroid tissue may present in the mediastinum from embryonic remnants or ectopic thyroid tissue displaced during embryonic development. Ectopic thyroid tissue can occur anywhere along the embryologic migratory pathway, from the diaphragm to the tongue. This ectopic thyroid tissue represents only 1% of mediastinal masses.

=== Middle Mediastinal Tumors ===
==== Cardiac tumors ====
Cardiac tumors are rare, with estimated prevalence of 0.02%.

This echocardiogram demonstrates a myxoma in the left atrium (upper right chamber in this view).

Cardiac tumors are more commonly benign rather than malignant. The most common type of primary cardiac tumor is a cardiac myxoma, a benign tumor arising from the interatrial septum of the left atrium. The most common cardiac tumor in the pediatric population is cardiac rhabdomyoma, a benign tumor associated with tuberous sclerosis. Other benign cardiac tumors include fibromas, lipomas, and hemangiomas.

Malignant cardiac tumors overall carry a poor prognosis. The most common is angiosarcoma, which affects middle aged men and can invade surrounding structures and metastasize to the brain. Other malignant tumors affecting the heart include rhabdomyosarcoma, leiomyosarcoma and lymphoma.

While most patients are asymptomatic, some may present with chest pain, arrhythmias, pericardial effusions, syncope, or embolic events. Tumors are initially detected through imaging, usually echocardiograms, and can be further characterized by CT and MRI. Treatment for benign tumors focuses on surgical resection, while malignant tumors require chemotherapy and/or radiation.

==== Neurogenic tumors ====
Neurogenic tumors can extend or arise from the middle mediastinum, but most commonly affect the posterior mediastinum as described below.

=== Posterior Mediastinal Tumors ===
==== Neurogenic tumors ====
Neurogenic tumors comprise over 60% of posterior mediastinal tumors and 30% of them can be malignant. The most common types are nerve sheath neoplasms such as Schwannomas and neurofibromas as well as ganglion cell neoplasms such as neuroblastomas and ganglioneuroblastomas. Schwannomas are benign and slow-growing, but can undergo malignant transformation more often in patients with neurofibromatosis. Treatment is surgery and/or radiation; chemotherapy does not help. Neuroblastomas arise from neuroganglia near the thoracic spine and mostly occur in pediatric patients under 2 years of age. Treatment is focused on surgical resection with chemotherapy or radiation. Ganglioneuroblastomas are tumors of the adrenal gland or other sympathetic structures and are similarly most common in infants. Surgical resection of any neurogenic tumor is usually performed via minimally invasive video-assisted thoracic surgery (VATS).

== Diagnosis ==
Most patients (60%) initially seek medical care due to symptoms, while others are asymptomatic and the mass is incidentally found through other tests and imaging. Symptoms are often due to the mass compressing surrounding structures like the lungs, esophagus, throat and heart. This can cause cough, chest pain, difficulty breathing, voice hoarseness, and difficulty swallowing. In the case of lymphomas, patients may present with constitutional symptoms (B symptoms) like weight loss, fever and night sweats.

A chest x-ray is usually the initial, quickest imaging study and can reveal enlargement of the mediastinum. However, the most valuable imaging modality is the CT scan of the chest. It can localize the lesion in relation to surrounding structures and reveal qualities of the mass helpful for diagnosis. CT can also demonstrate spread of the disease as seen by lymphadenopathy.

If further information is needed, MRI can provide better soft tissue resolution. For example, a benign thymic hyperplasia has increased fat content seen on MRI as compared to thymic carcinoma. Thus, the MRI can help diagnose between benign and malignant conditions and help guide treatment steps. MRI is more useful than CT when evaluating neurogenic tumors and neural/spinal involvement. Evaluation of the extent of involvement in surrounding structures is especially important when considering surgical resection of the mass.

Tissue biopsy can definitively diagnose a mediastinal mass, but is not required in cases where imaging can make a reliable diagnosis. Radiographic features are most reliable in cases of thymomas, teratomas and thyroid goiters. An ultrasound or CT-guided biopsy under only local anesthesia is usually sufficient. For tumors demonstrating features of malignancy, histological, molecular and genetic analysis of a tissue biopsy is crucial in guiding treatment decisions.

== See also ==
- Mediastinal lymphadenopathy
