= GPR32 =

Human biochemical receptor

Identifiers
- Aliases: GPR32, RVDR1, G protein-coupled receptor 32
- External IDs: OMIM: 603195; GeneCards: GPR32

Gene location (Human)
Chr.	Chromosome 19 (human)
Band	19q13.33	Start	50,770,464 bp
Band	19q13.33	End	50,771,732 bp
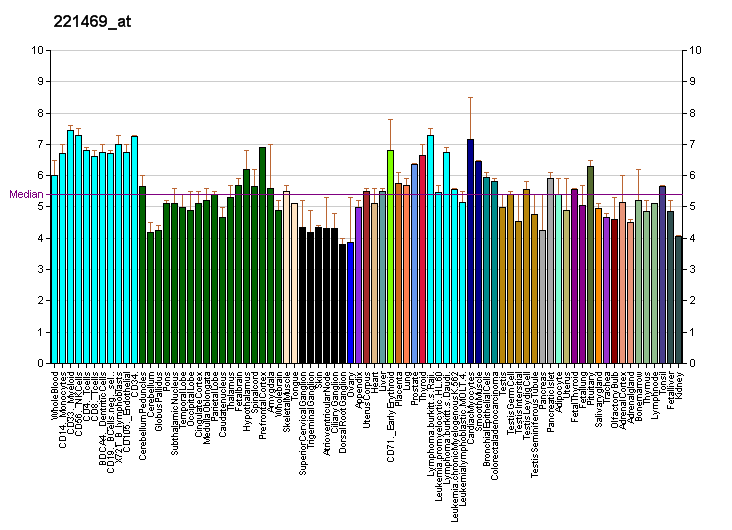
RNA expression pattern
Bgee	Human / Mouse (ortholog); Top expressed in: placenta; tibialis anterior muscle / n/a; More reference expression data
BioGPS	More reference expression data
Gene ontology
Molecular function	G protein-coupled receptor activity; signal transducer activity; complement receptor activity; N-formyl peptide receptor activity
Cellular component	integral component of membrane; plasma membrane; integral component of plasma membrane; membrane
Biological process	G protein-coupled receptor signaling pathway; signal transduction; complement receptor mediated signaling pathway; inflammatory response; phospholipase C-activating G protein-coupled receptor signaling pathway; positive regulation of cytosolic calcium ion concentration; leukocyte migration; cell chemotaxis
Sources:Amigo / QuickGO
Orthologs
Databases	NCBI: entry; OMA: entry
Species	Human	Mouse
Entrez	2854	n/a
Ensembl	ENSG00000142511	n/a
UniProt	O75388	n/a
RefSeq (mRNA)	NM_001506	n/a
RefSeq (protein)	NP_001497	n/a
Location (UCSC)	Chr 19: 50.77 – 50.77 Mb	n/a
PubMed search		n/a
- Wikidata
View/Edit Human

G protein-coupled receptor 32, also known as GPR32 or the RvD1 receptor, is a human receptor (biochemistry) belonging to the rhodopsin-like subfamily of G protein-coupled receptors.

== Gene ==
The GPR32 was initially identified and defined by molecular cloning in 1998 as coding for an orphan receptor, i.e. a protein with an amino acid sequence similar to known receptors but having no known ligand(s) to which it responds and no known function. The projected amino acid sequence of GPR32, however, shared 35-39% amino acid identity with certain members of the chemotactic factor receptor family, i.e. 39% identity with Formyl peptide receptor 1, which is a receptor for N-Formylmethionine-leucyl-phenylalanine and related N-formyl peptide chemotactic factors, and 35% identity with Formyl peptide receptor 2, which likewise is also a receptor for N-formyl peptides but also a receptor for certain lipoxins which are arachidonic acid metabolites belonging to a set of specialized proresolving mediators that act to resolve or inhibit inflammatory reactions. GPR32 mapped to chromosomal 19, region q13.3. There are no mouse or other orthologs of GPR32.

== Receptor ==
The GPR32 protein is a G protein coupled receptor although the specific G protein subtypes which it activates has not yet been reported. GPR32 is expressed in human blood neutrophils, certain types of blood lymphocytes (i.e. activated CD8+ cells, CD4+ T cells, and T helper 17 cells), tissue macrophages, small airway epithelial cells, and adipose tissue. When expressed in Chinese hamster ovary cells, GPR32 inhibits the Cyclic adenosine monophosphate signaling pathway under both baseline and forskolin-stimulated conditions indicating that it is a member of the class of orphan G protein coupled receptors that possesses constitutive signaling activity.

At least 6 members of the D series of resolvins (RvDs) viz., RvD1, RvD2m AT-RVD1, RvD3, AT-RvD3, and RvD5, activate their target cells through this receptor; these results have led to naming GPR32 the RVD1 receptor (see resolvin mechanisms of action). RvDs are members of the specialized proresolving mediators (SPM) class of polyunsaturated fatty acid metabolites. RVDs are metabolites of the omega-3 fatty acid, docosahexaenoic acid (DHA), and, along with other SRMs contribute to the inhibition and resolution of a diverse range of inflammation and inflammation-related responses as well as to the healing of these inflammatory lesions in animals and humans. The metabolism of DHA to RVD's and the activation of GPR32 by these RVD's are proposed to be one mechanism by which omega-3 fatty acids may ameliorate inflammation as well as various inflammation-based and other diseases.

== Ligands ==
Agonists

- Resolvins - Resolvin D1, Resolvin D3 and Resolvin D5
- NCGC00135472
