= Formyl peptide receptor 2 =

Protein-coding gene in the species Homo sapiens

FPR2

Identifiers
- Aliases: FPR2, ALXR, FMLP-R-II, FMLPX, FPR2A, FPRH1, FPRH2, FPRL1, HM63, LXA4R, formyl peptide receptor 2, ALX
- External IDs: OMIM: 136538; MGI: 1278319; GeneCards: FPR2

Gene location (Human)
Chr.	Chromosome 19 (human)
Band	19q13.41	Start	51,752,026 bp
Band	19q13.41	End	51,770,531 bp

Gene location (Mouse)
Chr.	Chromosome 17 (mouse)
Band	17|17 A3.2	Start	18,108,086 bp
Band	17|17 A3.2	End	18,114,214 bp
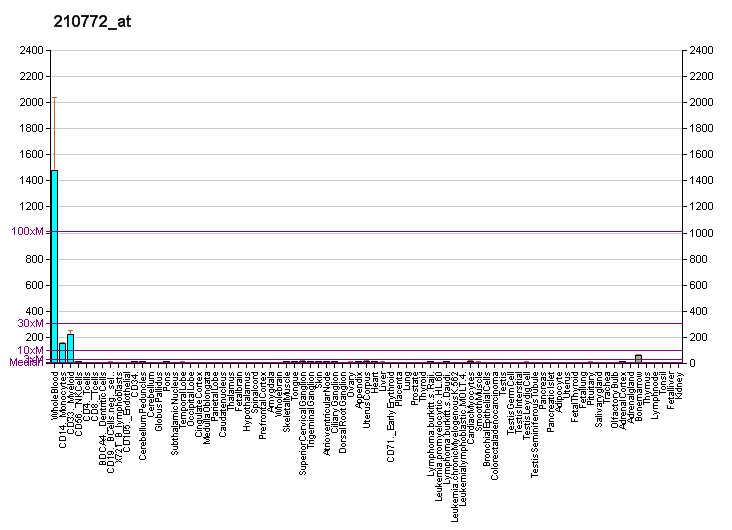

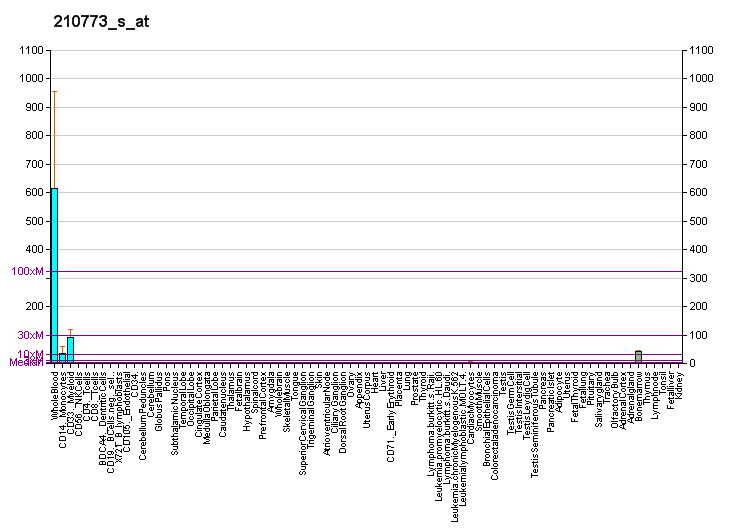
RNA expression pattern
Bgee	Human / Mouse (ortholog); Top expressed in: blood; monocyte; granulocyte; bone marrow; bone marrow cell; right lung; spleen; appendix; periodontal fiber; upper lobe of left lung / Top expressed in: granulocyte; tibiofemoral joint; right lung lobe; blood; bone marrow; stroma of bone marrow; left lung lobe; spleen; substantia nigra; vestibular membrane of cochlear duct; More reference expression data
BioGPS	More reference expression data
Gene ontology
Molecular function	signal transducer activity; G protein-coupled receptor activity; complement receptor activity; N-formyl peptide receptor activity; amyloid-beta binding; scavenger receptor binding; cargo receptor activity; signaling receptor activity
Cellular component	plasma membrane; membrane; integral component of membrane; integral component of plasma membrane; specific granule membrane; tertiary granule membrane; ficolin-1-rich granule membrane; cytoplasm
Biological process	inflammatory response; signal transduction; cell adhesion; chemotaxis; G protein-coupled receptor signaling pathway; complement receptor mediated signaling pathway; phospholipase C-activating G protein-coupled receptor signaling pathway; positive regulation of cytosolic calcium ion concentration; neutrophil degranulation; leukocyte migration; cell chemotaxis; microglial cell activation; positive regulation of protein phosphorylation; receptor-mediated endocytosis; adenylate cyclase-inhibiting G protein-coupled receptor signaling pathway; calcium-mediated signaling; positive regulation of superoxide anion generation; astrocyte activation; positive chemotaxis; positive regulation of 1-phosphatidylinositol-3-kinase activity; positive regulation of ERK1 and ERK2 cascade; positive regulation of monocyte chemotaxis; cellular response to amyloid-beta; immune response-regulating cell surface receptor signaling pathway; cell surface receptor signaling pathway; defense response to bacterium; positive regulation of innate immune response; negative regulation of inflammatory response; positive regulation of phagocytosis
Sources:Amigo / QuickGO
Orthologs
Databases	NCBI: entry; OMA: entry
Species	Human	Mouse
Entrez	2358	14289
Ensembl	ENSG00000171049	ENSMUSG00000052270
UniProt	P25090	O88536
RefSeq (mRNA)	NM_001005738; NM_001462	NM_008039
RefSeq (protein)	NP_001005738; NP_001453	NP_032065
Location (UCSC)	Chr 19: 51.75 – 51.77 Mb	Chr 17: 18.11 – 18.11 Mb
PubMed search
- Wikidata
View/Edit Human	View/Edit Mouse

N-formyl peptide receptor 2 (FPR2) is a G-protein coupled receptor (GPCR) located on the surface of many cell types of various animal species. The human receptor protein is encoded by the FPR2 gene and is activated to regulate cell function by binding any one of a wide variety of ligands including not only certain N-Formylmethionine-containing oligopeptides such as N-Formylmethionine-leucyl-phenylalanine (FMLP) but also the polyunsaturated fatty acid metabolite of arachidonic acid, lipoxin A4 (LXA4) and long chain Ceramide . Because of its interaction with lipoxin A4, FPR2 is also commonly named the ALX/FPR2 or just ALX receptor.

== Nomenclature ==
Confusingly, there are two "standard" nomenclatures for FPR receptors and their genes, the first used, FPR, FPR1, and FPR2 and its replacement, FPR1, FPR2 (this gene), and FPR3. The latter nomenclature is recommended by the International Union of Basic and Clinical Pharmacology and is used here. Other previously used names for FPR1 are NFPR, and FMLPR; for FPR2 are FPRH1, FPRL1, RFP, LXA4R, ALXR, FPR2/ALX, HM63, FMLPX, and FPR2A; and for FPR3 are FPRH2, FPRL2, and FMLPY.

== Gene ==
=== Human ===
The human FPR2 gene encodes the 351 amino acid receptor, FPR2, within an intronless open reading frame. It forms a cluster with FPR1 and FPR3 genes on chromosome 19q.13.3 in the order of FPR1, FPR2, and FPR3; this cluster also includes the genes for two other chemotactic factor receptors, the G protein-coupled C5a receptor (also termed CD88) and a second C5a receptor, GPR77 (i.e. C5a2 or C5L2), which has the structure of G protein receptors but apparently does not couple to G proteins and is of uncertain function. The FPR1, FPR2, and FPR3 paralogs, based on phylogenetic analysis, originated from a common ancestor with early duplication of FPR1 and FPR2/FPR3 splitting with FPR3 originating from the latest duplication event near the origin of primates.

=== Mouse ===
Mice have no less than 7 FPR receptors encoded by 7 genes that localize to chromosome 17A3.2 in the following order: Fpr1, Fpr-rs2 (or fpr2), Fpr-rs1 (or LXA4R), Fpr-rs4, Fpr-rs7, Fpr-rs7, Fpr-rs6, and Fpr-rs3; this locus also contains Pseudogenes ψFpr-rs2 and ψFpr-rs3 (or ψFpr-rs5) which lie just after Fpr-rs2 and Fpr-rs1, respectively. The 7 mouse FPR receptors have ≥50% amino acid sequence identity with each other as well as with the three human FPR receptors. Fpr2 and mFpr-rs1 bind with high affinity and respond to lipoxins but have little or no affinity for, and responsiveness to, formyl peptides; they thereby share key properties with human FPR2;

=== Rat ===
Rats express an ortholog of FPR2 (74% amino acid sequence identity) with high affinity for lipoxin A4.

== Expression ==
The FPR2 receptor is expressed on human neutrophils, eosinophils, monocytes, macrophages, T cells, synovial fibroblasts, and intestinal and airway epithelium.

FPL2 is often co-expressed with FPR1. It is widely expressed by circulating blood neutrophils, eosinophils, basophils, and monocytes; lymphocyte T cells and B cells; tissue Mast cells, macrophages, fibroblasts, and immature dendritic cells; vascular endothelial cells; neural tissue glial cells, astrocytes, and neuroblastoma cells; liver hepatocytes; various types of epithelial cells; and various types of multicellular tissues.

== Function ==
Many oligopeptides with an N-Formylmethionine N-terminal residue—such as the prototypical tripeptide N-Formylmethionine-leucyl-phenylalanine (FMLP)—are products of bacterial protein synthesis. These formylated peptides stimulate granulocytes to migrate directionally (see chemotaxis), and to engage in phagocytosis and bacterial killing, thereby contributing to host defense by directing the innate immune response during acute inflammation.

Early studies indicated that these peptides act through a receptor-mediated mechanism. To investigate this, researchers used the human leukocyte cell line HL-60, which consists of promyelocytes that do not respond to FMLP. Upon differentiation into granulocytes, which do respond, the cells were used to partially purify and clone a gene. When this gene was transfected into FMLP-unresponsive cells, it conferred responsiveness to FMLP and other N-formyl oligopeptides. This receptor was initially named the formyl peptide receptor (FPR). Subsequently, two additional genes were cloned, encoding receptor-like proteins with high sequence similarity to FPR. These three receptors were initially named inconsistently but are now designated formyl peptide receptor 1 (FPR1), formyl peptide receptor 2 (FPR2; this gene), and formyl peptide receptor 3 (FPR3). FPR2 and FPR3 are grouped with FPR1 based on sequence homology, not ligand specificity.

Indeed, FPR2 exhibits markedly different ligand preferences and biological functions compared to FPR1, while FPR3 does not bind FMLP or most other N-formyl peptides that activate FPR1 or FPR2. A major function of FPR2 is to bind certain specialized pro-resolving mediators (SPMs)—including lipoxin (Lx)A4, AT-LxA4 (arachidonic acid metabolites), and resolvin D1 (RvD1), RvD2, and AT-RvD1 (derived from docosahexaenoic acid)—and to mediate their inflammation-resolving effects. In addition, FPR2 also responds to a wide range of peptides and proteins that may promote inflammation or regulate unrelated processes. The physiological role of FPR3 remains unclear.

=== Knockout studies ===
The large number of mouse compared to human FPR receptors makes it difficult to extrapolate human FPR functions based on genetic (e.g. gene knockout or forced overexpression) or other experimental manipulations of the FPR receptors in mice. In any event, combined disruption of the Fpr2 and Fpr3 genes causes mice to mount enhanced acute inflammatory responses as evidenced in three models, intestine inflammation caused by mesenteric artery ischemia-reperfusion, paw swelling caused by carrageenan injection, and arthritis caused by the intraperitoneal injection of arthritis-inducing serum. Since Fpr2 gene knockout mice exhibit a faulty innate immune response to intravenous listeria monocytogenes injection, these results suggest that the human FPR2 receptor and mouse Fpr3 receptor have equivalent functions in dampening at least certain inflammatory response.

== Endogenous ligands ==
FPR2, also known as the LXA4 receptor or ALX/FPR2, was initially identified as a high-affinity receptor for the arachidonic acid metabolite lipoxin A4 (LXA4). It was later found to also bind the related metabolites aspirin-triggered lipoxin A4 (ATL, or 15-epi-LXA4), and the docosahexaenoic acid derivative resolvin D1 (RvD1). These three lipid mediators act to inhibit and resolve inflammation.

Originally classified as an orphan receptor and termed RFP, FPR2 was discovered by screening myeloid cell-derived libraries using a formyl-methionyl-leucyl-phenylalanine (FMLP)-like probe.

In addition to LXA4, ATL, RvD1, and FMLP, FPR2 interacts with a wide range of polypeptides, proteins, and their derivatives. These ligands contribute to processes beyond inflammation, including obesity, neurodegeneration, reproduction, and cancer. Nevertheless, FPR2 is best known for mediating the anti-inflammatory and pro-resolving actions of lipoxins and resolvins.

A partial list of FPR2/ALX ligands and their proposed inflammatory effects (based on in vitro and animal studies) includes:

- Bacterial and mitochondrial N-formyl peptides such as FMLP – pro-inflammatory (though possibly less physiologically significant than lipid-derived ligands);
- Hp(2–20), from Helicobacter pylori – pro-inflammatory;
- HIV-1-derived peptides: T21/DP107 and N36 (from gp41), F peptide (from gp120), and V3 peptide (from the MN strain) – unknown effects;
- CCL23β (amino acids 22–137), a splice variant of CCL23, and SHAAGtide, a proteolytic product – pro-inflammatory;
- Annexin A1-derived peptides (Ac2–26 and Ac9–25) – dose-dependent; anti-inflammatory at low concentrations, pro-inflammatory at high concentrations;
- Amyloid β(1–42) and PrP(106–126) (from prion protein) – pro-inflammatory, suggesting roles in Alzheimer's disease, Parkinson's disease, Huntington's disease, and prion diseases such as Creutzfeldt–Jakob disease and Kuru;
- Humanin, a neuroprotective peptide – anti-inflammatory, counteracting amyloid-induced inflammation;
- Cleaved fragments of UPARAP (uPAR): D2D3(88–274) and uPAR(84–95) – pro-inflammatory;
- Antimicrobial peptides: LL-37 and CRAMP (human/rat cathelicidins), Pleurocidins (from fish), and Temporin A (frog-derived) – pro-inflammatory;
- Pituitary adenylate cyclase-activating polypeptide 27 – pro-inflammatory;
- Long-chain ceramides (C14–C20) – bind FPR2 in beige and brown adipocytes to inhibit thermogenesis.

== Anti-inflammatory drugs ==
Dual and selective FPR2 Agonists in clinical development:

- ACT-389949: A small-molecule FPR2 agonist that has completed phase 1 clinical trials
- BMS-986235: Another FPR2 agonist in phase 1 trials, with evidence of resolving cardiac inflammation and improving cardiac function in preclinical models.
- BLXA4 (Methyl ester-benzo-lipoxin A4): An LXA4 analog tested in phase 1 clinical trials for gingival inflammation, shown to reduce local inflammation.

Rezuforimod is a potent and selective FPR2 agonist that inhibits neutrophil adhesion and exhibits broad anti-inflammatory activity.

== See also ==
- Eicosanoid receptor
- Formyl peptide receptor
- Lipoxin
- Resolvin
- Formyl peptide receptor 1
- Formyl peptide receptor 3
