= HEBP1 =

Available structures
PDB	Ortholog search: PDBe RCSB
PDB	List of PDB id codes 2GOV, 2HVA, 4A1M

Identifiers
- Aliases: HEBP1, HBP, HEBP, heme binding protein 1
- External IDs: OMIM: 605826; MGI: 1333880; HomoloGene: 8407; GeneCards: HEBP1; OMA:HEBP1 - orthologs

Gene location (Human)
Chr.	Chromosome 12 (human)
Band	12p13.1	Start	12,974,870 bp
Band	12p13.1	End	13,000,265 bp

Gene location (Mouse)
Chr.	Chromosome 6 (mouse)
Band	6|6 G1	Start	135,114,520 bp
Band	6|6 G1	End	135,175,020 bp
RNA expression pattern
Bgee	Human / Mouse (ortholog); Top expressed in: jejunal mucosa; duodenum; mucosa of ileum; right adrenal gland; right adrenal cortex; left adrenal gland; trabecular bone; parotid gland; left adrenal cortex; left lobe of thyroid gland / Top expressed in: fetal liver hematopoietic progenitor cell; left lobe of liver; yolk sac; tibiofemoral joint; spleen; white adipose tissue; subcutaneous adipose tissue; gastrula; migratory enteric neural crest cell; efferent ductule; More reference expression data
BioGPS	n/a
Gene ontology
Molecular function	heme binding
Cellular component	cytoplasm; extracellular region; extracellular exosome; cytosol
Biological process	circadian rhythm; G protein-coupled receptor signaling pathway
Sources:Amigo / QuickGO
Orthologs
Species	Human	Mouse
Entrez	50865	15199
Ensembl	ENSG00000013583	ENSMUSG00000042770
UniProt	Q9NRV9	Q9R257
RefSeq (mRNA)	NM_015987	NM_013546
RefSeq (protein)	NP_057071	NP_038574
Location (UCSC)	Chr 12: 12.97 – 13 Mb	Chr 6: 135.11 – 135.18 Mb
PubMed search
- Wikidata
View/Edit Human	View/Edit Mouse

Heme binding protein 1 is a protein that in humans is encoded by the HEBP1 gene.

== Function ==
The full-length protein encoded by this gene is an intracellular tetrapyrrole-binding protein. This protein includes a natural chemoattractant peptide of 21 amino acids at the N-terminus, which is a natural ligand for formyl peptide receptor-like receptor 2 (FPRL2) and promotes calcium mobilization and chemotaxis in monocytes and dendritic cells.
