= Rezuforimod =

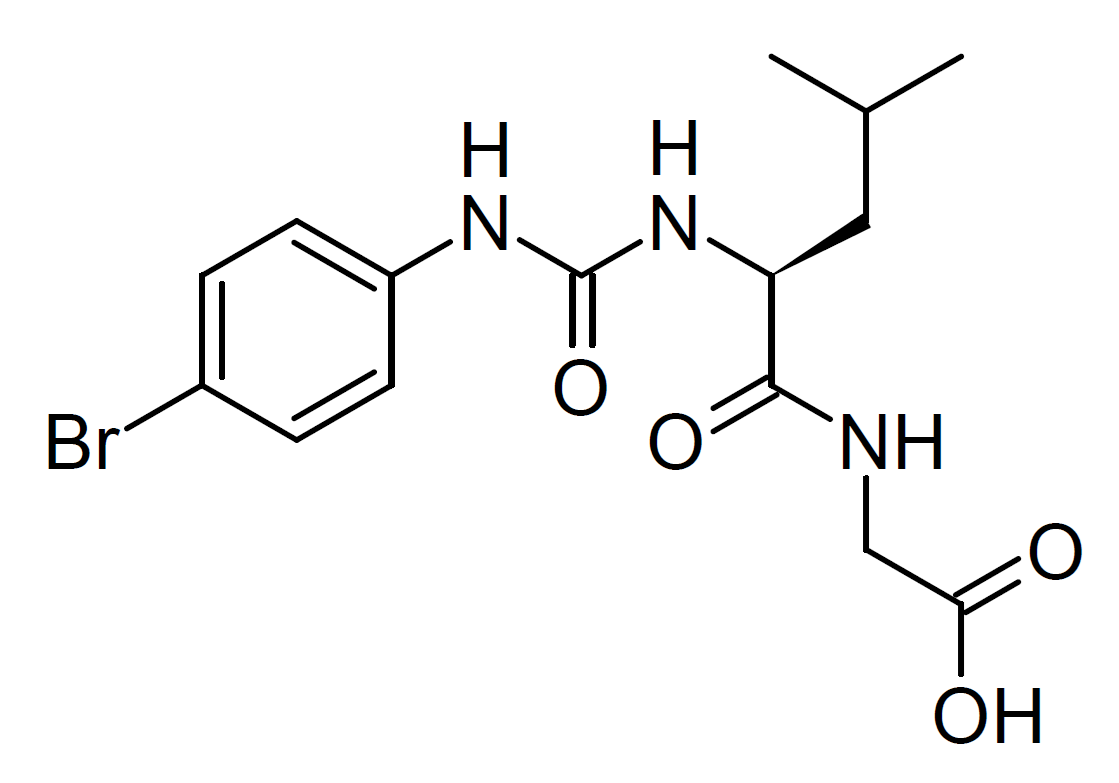

Identifiers
- IUPAC name: 2-{[(2S)-2-[(4-bromophenyl)carbamoylamino]-4-methylpentanoyl]amino}acetic acid
- CAS Number: 1431754-15-2
- PubChem CID: 71526099
- UNII: 54P16AUY6D
- ChEMBL: ChEMBL4785302

Chemical and physical data
- Formula: C_{15}H_{20}BrN_{3}O_{4}
- Molar mass: 386.246 g·mol^{−1}
- 3D model (JSmol): Interactive image
- SMILES: CC(C)C[C@@H](C(=O)NCC(=O)O)NC(=O)NC1=CC=C(C=C1)Br
- InChI: InChI=1S/C15H20BrN3O4/c1-9(2)7-12(14(22)17-8-13(20)21)19-15(23)18-11-5-3-10(16)4-6-11/h3-6,9,12H,7-8H2,1-2H3,(H,17,22)(H,20,21)(H2,18,19,23)/t12-/m0/s1; Key:LASJSIMHDHTROE-LBPRGKRZSA-N

Rezuforimod is an experimental drug that acts as a potent and selective agonist of formyl peptide receptor 2 with an EC_{50} of 0.88 nM, which inhibits neutrophil adhesion and has antiinflammatory effects.
