= N-Formylmethionine (data page) =

Chemical data page

The complete data for N-Formylmethionine
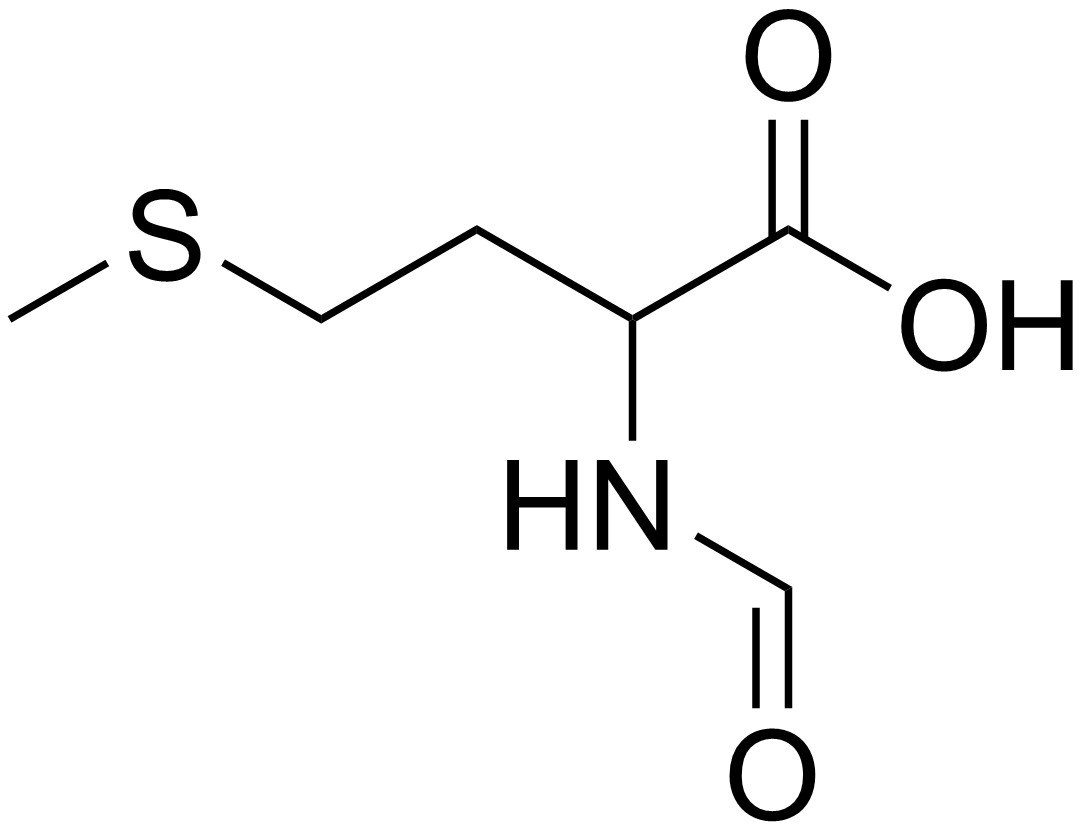
General information
Chemical formula: C_{6}H_{11}NO_{3}S
Molar mass: ? g·mol^{−1}
Systematic name:
2-formamido-4-methylsulfanyl-butanoic acid
Synonyms:
2-Formylamino-4-methylsulfanyl-butyric acid
Formylmethionine
N-FORMYLMETHIONINE
N-Formyl(methyl)homocysteine
N-Formyl-DL-methionine
N-formyl-L-methionine
N-formyl-methionine
NSC 334322
Database data
SMILES: CSCCC(C(=O)O)NC=O
InChI=1/C6H11NO3S/c1-11-3-2-5(6(9)10)7-4-8/h4-5H,2-3H2,1H3,(H,7,8)(H,9,10)/f/h7,9H

ATC: N/A	CAS: N/A	DrugBank: N/A	EINECS: 224-322-8	PubChem: 911 ^{a}

Physical properties

Structure	Crystal data	Spectral data: UV-Vis / IR / NMR / MS

Phase behavior	Solid properties	Liquid properties	Gas properties

Hazard properties

MSDS N/A	Main hazards: N/A	NFPA 704	Flash point: N/A	RTECS number: N/A

Chemical properties

XLogP: 0.001	pI: ?	pK_{a}: ?	Tautomers: ?	Hydrogen bond: donor - ?; acceptor - ?

Pharmacological properties

This box:
- Except where noted otherwise, data relate to Standard temperature and pressure.
- Reliability of data general note.
