= NCGC00135472 =

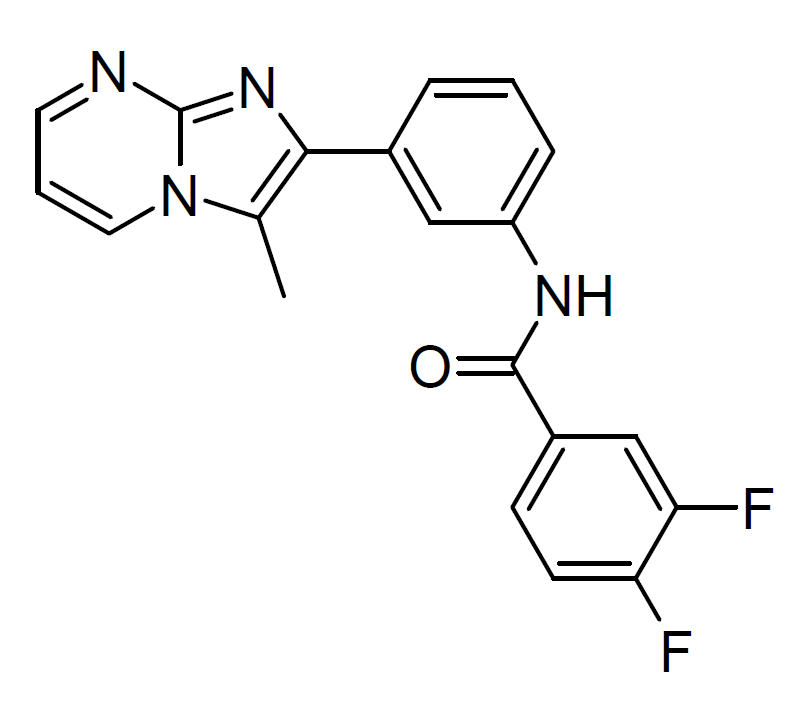

Identifiers
- IUPAC name: 3,4-difluoro-N-[3-(3-methylimidazo[1,2-a]pyrimidin-2-yl)phenyl]benzamide
- CAS Number: 862811-76-5
- PubChem CID: 7080326
- ChemSpider: 5431483

Chemical and physical data
- Formula: C_{20}H_{14}F_{2}N_{4}O
- Molar mass: 364.356 g·mol^{−1}
- 3D model (JSmol): Interactive image
- SMILES: CC1=C(N=C2N1C=CC=N2)C3=CC(=CC=C3)NC(=O)C4=CC(=C(C=C4)F)F
- InChI: InChI=1S/C20H14F2N4O/c1-12-18(25-20-23-8-3-9-26(12)20)13-4-2-5-15(10-13)24-19(27)14-6-7-16(21)17(22)11-14/h2-11H,1H3,(H,24,27); Key:YOVZCQZBMAXLPR-UHFFFAOYSA-N

NCGC00135472 (GPR32 agonist C2A) is a chemical compound which acts as a potent and selective partial agonist of the previously orphan receptor GPR32 (DRV1/RvD1). It stimulates phagocytosis by macrophages in a similar manner to the endogenous ligand resolvin D1. NCGC00135472 was discovered by high-throughput screening, and as one of the first synthetic agonists developed for this receptor, it is hoped that the discovery of this compound will lead to the development of improved ligands which will be useful for the study of GPR32 and its functions in the body.
