= Formyl peptide receptor 3 =

Protein-coding gene in the species Homo sapiens

FPR3

Identifiers
- Aliases: FPR3, FML2_HUMAN, FMLPY, FPRH1, FPRH2, FPRL2, RMLP-R-I, FMLP-R-II, formyl peptide receptor 3
- External IDs: OMIM: 136539; GeneCards: FPR3

Gene location (Human)
Chr.	Chromosome 19 (human)
Band	19q13.41	Start	51,795,157 bp
Band	19q13.41	End	51,826,190 bp
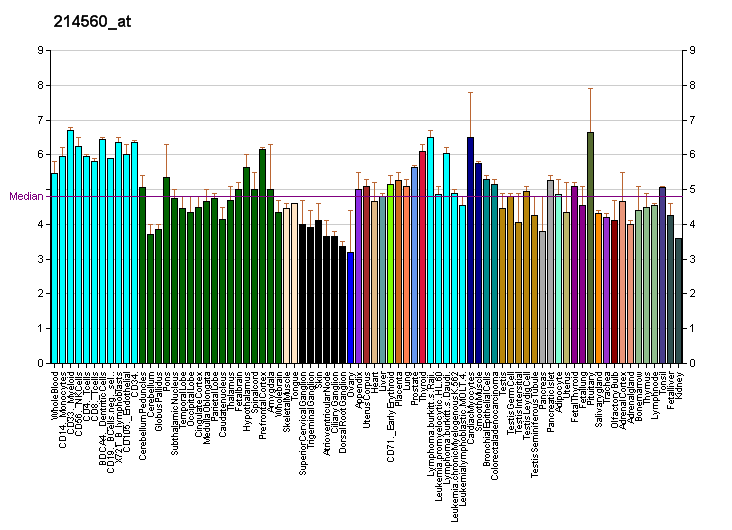
RNA expression pattern
Bgee	Human / Mouse (ortholog); Top expressed in: gallbladder; rectum; gonad; amniotic fluid; right coronary artery; synovial joint; synovial membrane; mucosa of sigmoid colon; appendix; Achilles tendon / n/a; More reference expression data
BioGPS	More reference expression data
Gene ontology
Molecular function	G protein-coupled receptor activity; signal transducer activity; complement receptor activity; N-formyl peptide receptor activity
Cellular component	integral component of membrane; plasma membrane; membrane; integral component of plasma membrane
Biological process	chemotaxis; signal transduction; complement receptor mediated signaling pathway; inflammatory response; phospholipase C-activating G protein-coupled receptor signaling pathway; positive regulation of cytosolic calcium ion concentration; leukocyte migration; cell chemotaxis; G protein-coupled receptor signaling pathway
Sources:Amigo / QuickGO
Orthologs
Databases	NCBI: entry; OMA: entry
Species	Human	Mouse
Entrez	2359	n/a
Ensembl	ENSG00000187474	n/a
UniProt	P25089	n/a
RefSeq (mRNA)	NM_002030	n/a
RefSeq (protein)	NP_002021	n/a
Location (UCSC)	Chr 19: 51.8 – 51.83 Mb	n/a
PubMed search		n/a
- Wikidata
View/Edit Human

N-formyl peptide receptor 3 (FPR3) is a receptor protein that in humans is encoded by the FPR3 gene.

== Nomenclature note ==
Confusingly, there are two nomenclatures for FPR receptors and their genes, the first one used, FPR, FPR1, and FPR2 and its replacement (which corresponds directly to these three respective receptors and their genes), FPR1, FPR2, and FPR3. The latter nomenclature is recommended by the International Union of Basic and Clinical Pharmacology and is used here. Other previously used names for FPR1 are NFPR, and FMLPR; for FPR2 are FPRH1, FPRL1, RFP, LXA4R, ALXR, FPR2/ALX, HM63, FMLPX, and FPR2A; and for FPR3 are FPRH2, FPRL2, and FMLPY.

== FPR3 function ==
The overall function of FPR3 is quite unclear. Compared to FPR1 and FPR2, FPR3 is highly phosphorylated (a signal for receptor inactivation and internalization) and more localized to small intracellular vesicles. This suggests that FPR3 rapidly internalizes after binding its ligands and thereby may serve as a "decoy" receptor to reduce the binding of its ligands to FRP1 and FRP2 receptors.

== Genes ==
=== Humans ===
The FPR3 gene was cloned and named based on the similarity of the amino acid sequence which it encodes to that encoded by the gene for FPR1 (see formyl peptide receptor 1 for details) The studies indicated that FPR3 is composed of 352 amino acids and its gene, similar to FPR1, has an intronless open reading frames which encodes a protein with the 7 transmembrane structure of G protein coupled receptors; FPR3 has 69% and 72% amino acid sequence identities with FPR1. All three genes localize to chromosome 19q.13.3 in the order of FPR1 (19q13.410), FPR2 (19q13.3-q13.4), and FPR3 (19q13.3-q13.4) to form a cluster which also includes the genes for another G protein-coupled chemotactic factor receptor, the C5a receptor (also termed CD88) and GPR77, and a second C5a receptor, C5a2 (C5L2), which has the structure of a G protein coupled receptor but fails to couple to G proteins and is of debated function.

=== Mice ===
Mouse FPR receptors localize to chromosome 17A3.2 in the following order: Fpr1, Fpr-rs2 (or fpr2), Fpr-rs1 (or LXA4R), Fpr-rs4, Fpr-rs7, Fpr-rs7, Fpr-rs6, and Fpr-rs3; Pseudogenes ψFpr-rs2 and ψFpr-rs3 (or ψFpr-rs5) lie just after Fpr-rs2 and Fpr-rs1, respectively. All of the active mouse FPR receptors have ≥50% amino acid sequence identity with each other as well as with the three human FPR receptors. Based on its predominantly intracellular distribution, mFpr-rs1 correlates, and therefore may share functionality, with human FPR3; However, the large number of mouse compared to human FPR receptors makes it difficult to extrapolate human FPR functions based on genetic (e.g. gene knockout or forced overexpression) or other experimental manipulations of the FPR receptors in mice.

=== Other species ===
FPR receptors are widely distributed throughout mammalian species with the FPR1, FPR2, and FPR3 paralogs, based on phylogenetic analysis, originating from a common ancestor and early duplication of FPR1 and FPR2/FPR3 splitting with FPR3 originating from the latest duplication event near the origin of primates. Rabbits express an ortholog of FPR1 (78% amino acid sequence identity) with high binding affinity for FMLP; rats express an ortholog of FPR2 (74% amino acid sequence identity) with high affinity for lipoxin A4.

== Cellular and tissue distribution ==
FPL3 is expressed by circulating monocytes, eosinophils, and basophils but not neutrophils; tissue macrophages and dendritic cells.

== Ligands and potential ligand-based disease related activities ==
The functions of FPR3 and the few ligands which activate it have not been fully clarified. Despite its homology to FPR1, FPR3 is unresponsive to many FPR1-stimulating formyl peptides including FMLP. However, fMMYALF, a N-formyl hexapeptide derived from the mitochondrial protein, NADH dehydrogenase subunit 6, is a weak agonist for FPR3 but >100-fold more potent in stimulating FPR1 and FPR2. F2L is a naturally occurring acylated peptide derived from the N-terminal sequence of heme-binding protein 1 by cathepsin D cleavage that potently stimulates chemotaxis through FPR3 in monocytes and monocyte-derived dendritic cells. F2L thereby may be a pro-inflammatory stimulus for FPR3. Similar to FPR2 (see FPR2 section), FPR3 is activated by humanin and thereby may be involved in inhibiting the inflammation occurring in and perhaps contributing to Alzheimer's disease.

== See also ==
- Formyl peptide receptor 1
- Formyl peptide receptor 2
- N-Formylmethionine-leucyl-phenylalanine
