= Pleurocidin =

Antimicrobial12

Identifiers
- Symbol: Antimicrobial12
- Pfam: PF08107
- InterPro: IPR012515
- TCDB: 1.C.62
- OPM superfamily: 142
- OPM protein: 1z64
Available protein structures:
- PDB: IPR012515 PF08107 (ECOD; PDBsum)
- AlphaFold: IPR012515; PF08107

Pleurocidin is an antimicrobial peptide found in the mucus secreted by the skin of the winter flounder (Pleuronectes americanus). It exhibits broad-spectrum antimicrobial activity. Pleurocidin assumes an amphipathic alpha-helical conformation similar to other linear antimicrobial peptides and may play a role in innate host defence.

== Potential Applications ==
Pleurocidin has been noted for its potential use in food safety, in part due to its heat stable properties and clinically demonstrated effectiveness against common food-borne microorganisms.
