= N-Formylmethionine-leucyl-phenylalanine =

N-Formylmethionine leucyl-phenylalanine
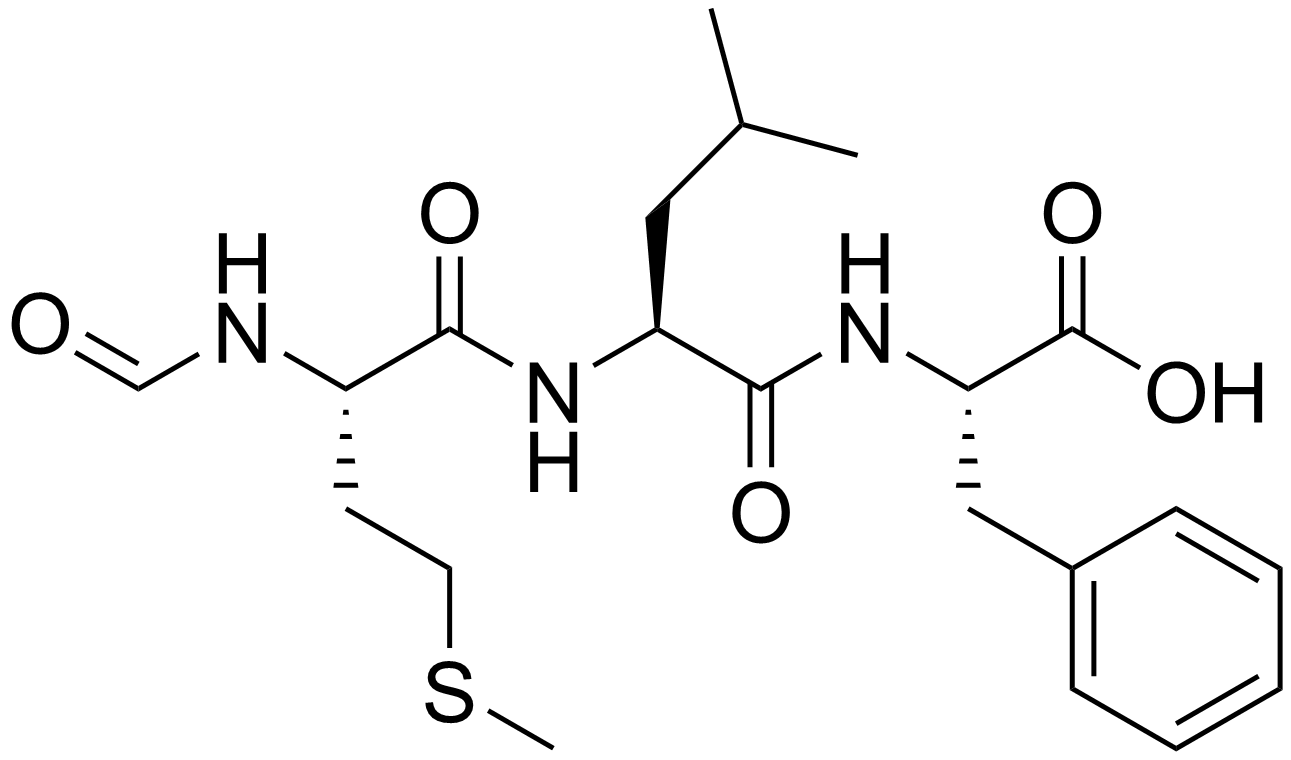

Names
- Systematic IUPAC name (2S)-2-{(2S)-2-[(2S)-2-Formamido-4-(methylsulfanyl)butanamido]-4-methylpentanamido}-3-phenylpropanoic acid
- Other names Chemotactic peptide F-Met-Leu-Phe; L-Phenylalanine, N-(N-(N-formyl-L-methionyl)-L-leucyl)- fMLP

Identifiers
CAS Number	59880-97-6
3D model (JSmol)	Interactive image
ChEBI	CHEBI:53490
ChemSpider	391541
IUPHAR/BPS	1022
MeSH	N-Formylmethionine+Leucyl-Phenylalanine
PubChem CID	443295
UNII	LO6AVJ8RCE
CompTox Dashboard (EPA)	DTXSID9041077
- InChI: InChI=1S/C21H31N3O5S/c1-14(2)11-17(23-19(26)16(22-13-25)9-10-30-3)20(27)24-18(21(28)29)12-15-7-5-4-6-8-15/h4-8,13-14,16-18H,9-12H2,1-3H3,(H,22,25)(H,23,26)(H,24,27)(H,28,29)/t16-,17-,18-/m0/s1 Key: PRQROPMIIGLWRP-BZSNNMDCSA-N
- SMILES: CC(C)C[C@@H](C(=O)N[C@@H](CC1=CC=CC=C1)C(=O)O)NC(=O)[C@H](CCSC)NC=O

Properties
Chemical formula	C_{21}H_{31}N_{3}O_{5}S
Molar mass	437.56 g·mol^{−1}
- Except where otherwise noted, data are given for materials in their standard state (at 25 °C [77 °F], 100 kPa). verify (what is ?) Infobox references

N-Formylmethionyl-leucyl-phenylalanine (fMLF, fMLP or N-formyl-met-leu-phe) is an N-formylated tripeptide and sometimes simply referred to as chemotactic peptide is a potent polymorphonuclear leukocyte (PMN) chemotactic factor and is also a macrophage activator.

fMLF is the prototypical representative of the N-formylated oligopeptide family of chemotactic factors. These oligopeptides are known to be, or mimic the actions of, the N-formyl oligopeptides that are (a) released by tissue bacteria, (b) attract and activate circulating blood leukocytes by binding to specific G protein coupled receptors on these cells, and (c) thereby direct the inflammatory response to sites of bacterial invasion. fMLF is involved in the innate immunity mechanism for host defense against pathogens.

fMLF led to the first discovery of a leukocyte receptor for a chemotactic factor, defined three different types of fMLF receptors that have complementary and/or opposing effects on inflammatory responses as well as many other activities, and helped define the stimulus-response coupling mechanisms by which diverse chemotactic factors and their G protein coupled receptors induce cellular function.

== Discovery ==
In 1887, Élie Metchnikoff observed that leukocytes isolated from the blood of various animals were attracted towards certain bacteria. This attraction was soon proposed to be due to soluble elements released by the bacteria (see Harris for a review of this area up to 1953). Peter Ward, Elmer Becker, Henry Showell, and colleagues showed that these elements were made by a variety of growing gram positive bacteria and gram negative bacteria and were of low molecular weight, i.e. below 3600 Dalton (unit)s. Further studies by Schiffmann and colleges found that cultures of growing Escherichia coli released oligopeptides of between 150 and 1500 daltons that appeared to have a free carboxylic acid group but not a free amine group.

Given these clues and knowledge that bacteria transcribe proteins starting with N-formylmethionine whereas eukaryotic cells mostly initiate protein synthesis with non-formylated methionine, Schiffmann, Corcoran, and Wahl theorized and then showed that N-formyl-methionine and a series N-formyl-methionyl dipeptides and tripeptides stimulated the chemotaxis of neutrophils isolated from rabbit peritoneal exudates as well as of macrophages isolated from guinea pig peritoneal exudates. In further studies of various N-formylated oligopeptides, fMLF proved the most potent in stimulating rabbit neutrophil chemotaxis. fMLF and a sampling of other, less potent, N-formyl oligopeptides were then found to stimulate a wide array of rabbit neutrophil functions such as: the transient auto-aggregation of these cells in suspension and equally transient fall in circulating neutrophils when injected into rabbit veins (these responses result from an increase in neutrophil adhesiveness to each other and/or vascular endothelium); the release (see degranulation) of intracellular granule-bound enzymes and other antimicrobial cytotoxic molecules; and the production and release of cytotoxic reactive oxygen species such as superoxide and hydrogen peroxide. All of these responses are part of the innate immune systems initial line of defense against bacterial invasions.

Follow-up studies found that the genes of mitochondria and chloroplasts of eukaryotic cells, including the mitochondria of humans, release N-formyl-methionyl containing peptides with chemotactic activities that exactly mimic those of fMLF. These organelle-derived formylated peptides are true analogs of fMLF that operate through fMLF receptors to recruit circulating blood leukocytes to and thereby initiate inflammation responses at sites of cell damage and tissue destruction not caused by bacteria. Thus, fMLF can act as a find-me signal, released by dead or dying cells to attract phagocytes to those cells, so that the phagocytes phagocytose the dead or dying cells, thereby clearing up the damage. fMLF and other N-formylated oligopeptides were found to be similarly active in human neutrophils. The high degree of structural specificity of a broad series of formylated peptides in stimulating these neutrophil responses, the specific binding of N-formylated oligopeptides to neutrophils with affinities that paralleled their stimulating potencies, the ability of t-carbobenzoxy-phenylalanyl-methionine to bind to but not stimulate neutrophils and thereby to block the neutrophil binding and stimulating activity of N-formylated oligopeptides, and the ability of the formylated oligopeptides to desensitize (i.e. render unresponsive) neutrophil functional responses to themselves but have no or a lesser ability to desensitize to a range of other chemotactic stimuli provided strong suggestive evidence that the formylated peptides acted on cells through a common, dedicated receptor system that differed from other chemotactic factor receptors.

== Receptors ==
The studies cited above lead to the eventual cloning of the human Formyl peptide receptor 1, a G protein coupled receptor that binds fMLF and other formylated oligopeptides to mediate their stimulatory actions on human and rabbit neutrophils. Subsequently, Formyl peptide receptor 2 and Formyl peptide receptor 3 were also cloned based on the similarities in their amino acid sequence to that of formyl peptide receptor 1. Formyl peptide receptors 2 and 3 have very different abilities to bind and respond to formylated oligopeptides including fMLF compared to formyl peptide receptor 1 and compared to each other and have very different functions than those of formyl peptide receptor 1.
