= Formyl peptide receptor 1 =

Protein-coding gene in the species Homo sapiens

FPR1

Identifiers
- Aliases: FPR1, FMLP, FPR, formyl peptide receptor 1
- External IDs: OMIM: 136537; MGI: 107443; GeneCards: FPR1

Gene location (Human)
Chr.	Chromosome 19 (human)
Band	19q13.41	Start	51,745,172 bp
Band	19q13.41	End	51,804,110 bp

Gene location (Mouse)
Chr.	Chromosome 17 (mouse)
Band	17 A3.2|17 10.63 cM	Start	18,096,733 bp
Band	17 A3.2|17 10.63 cM	End	18,104,202 bp
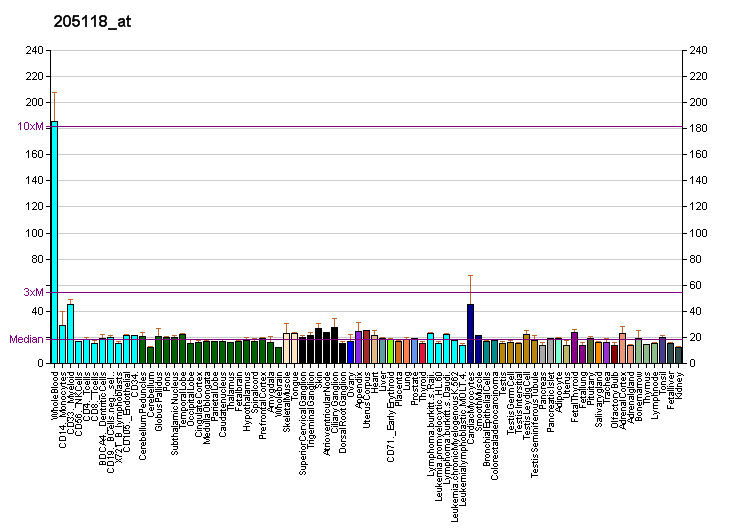

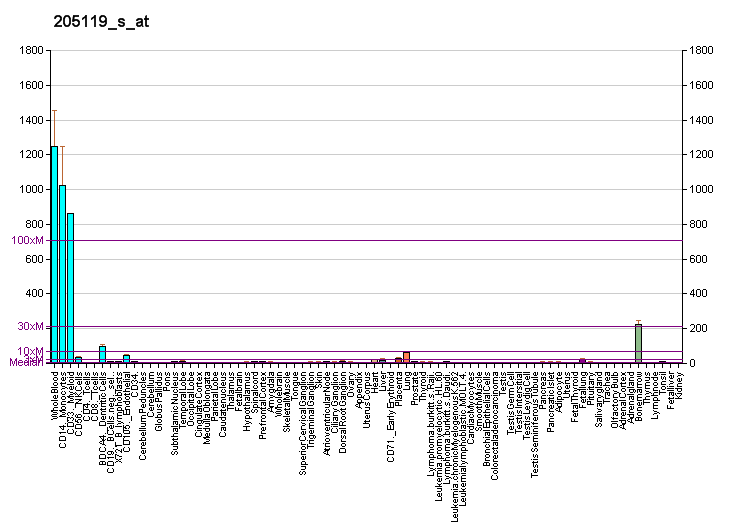
RNA expression pattern
Bgee	Human / Mouse (ortholog); Top expressed in: blood; monocyte; periodontal fiber; granulocyte; trabecular bone; spleen; bone marrow; right lung; upper lobe of left lung; bone marrow cell / Top expressed in: granulocyte; tibiofemoral joint; right lung lobe; stroma of bone marrow; blood; embryo; spleen; left lung; left lung lobe; liver; More reference expression data
BioGPS	More reference expression data
Gene ontology
Molecular function	RAGE receptor binding; signal transducer activity; G protein-coupled receptor activity; protein binding; N-formyl peptide receptor activity; complement receptor activity; G protein-coupled receptor binding; scavenger receptor binding
Cellular component	plasma membrane; membrane; integral component of membrane; integral component of plasma membrane; secretory granule membrane; azurophil granule membrane; ficolin-1-rich granule membrane; intracellular anatomical structure; cytoplasm
Biological process	phospholipase C-activating G protein-coupled receptor signaling pathway; adenylate cyclase-modulating G protein-coupled receptor signaling pathway; nitric oxide mediated signal transduction; G protein-coupled receptor signaling pathway; signal transduction; chemotaxis; complement receptor mediated signaling pathway; inflammatory response; positive regulation of cytosolic calcium ion concentration; neutrophil degranulation; leukocyte migration; cell chemotaxis; cytokine-mediated signaling pathway
Sources:Amigo / QuickGO
Orthologs
Databases	NCBI: entry; OMA: entry
Species	Human	Mouse
Entrez	2357	14293
Ensembl	ENSG00000171051	ENSMUSG00000045551
UniProt	P21462	P33766
RefSeq (mRNA)	NM_002029; NM_001193306	NM_013521
RefSeq (protein)	NP_001180235; NP_002020	NP_038549
Location (UCSC)	Chr 19: 51.75 – 51.8 Mb	Chr 17: 18.1 – 18.1 Mb
PubMed search
- Wikidata
View/Edit Human	View/Edit Mouse

Formyl peptide receptor 1 (FPR1, FPR1 receptor, fMet-Leu-Phe receptor 1, FMLP receptor 1, or N-formylmethionyl-leucyl-phenylalanine receptor 1) is a cell surface receptor protein that in humans is encoded by the formyl peptide receptor 1 (FPR1) gene. This gene encodes a G protein-coupled receptor cell surface protein that binds and is activated by N-Formylmethionine-containing oligopeptides, particularly N-Formylmethionine-leucyl-phenylalanine (FMLP). FPR1 is prominently expressed by mammalian phagocytic and blood leukocyte cells where it functions to mediate these cells' responses to the N-formylmethionine-containing oligopeptides which are released by invading microorganisms and injured tissues. FPR1 directs these cells to sites of invading pathogens or disrupted tissues and then stimulates these cells to kill the pathogens or to remove tissue debris; as such, it is an important component of the innate immune system that operates in host defense and damage control.

Humans also express two paralogs of FPR1 vis., FPR2 and FPR3. Mice express no fewer than 7 Fpr receptors and encoding genes that are homologous to FPR1 although no single one of these FPRs appears to perform exactly the same functions as any one of the human FPRs.

== Function ==
FPR1 binds with and is activated by:

1. bacterial and mitochondrial N-formyl peptides and thereby initiates innate host immune responses.
2. various synthetic N-formyl and non-formylated peptides that show distinguishing differences from those that interact with FPR2 and FPR3.
3. T20/DP178 & T21/DP107, N-acetylated polypeptides derived from the gp41 HIV-1 envelope protein. This interaction is of unknown physiological significance although peptide T20/DP178 is a licensed anti-retrovirus agent (pentafuside) termed Enfuvirtide which acts at the level of HIV-target cell fusion and is used clinically to treat HIV-1 infection).
4. Annexin A1 (also termed ANXA1 and lipocortin 1) and its N-terminal peptides (Ac2–26 and Ac9–25). At low concentrations, these agents stimulate neutrophils to raise cytosolic Ca^{2+} levels and thereby activate Ca^{2+}-dependent signaling pathways; however, they do not fully activate the MAPK pathway but rather leave the neutrophil desensitized (i.e. unresponsive) to chemokine IL-8. At high concentrations, in contrast, the agents fully activate neutrophils and are potent pro-inflammatory stimulants.

== History ==
Studies conducted in the 1970s found that a series of N-formylmethionine-containing oligopeptides, including the most potent and best known member of this series, N-Formylmethionine-leucyl-phenylalanine (FMLP or fMet-Leu-Phe), stimulated rabbit and human neutrophils by an apparent receptor-dependent mechanism to migrate in a directional pattern in classical laboratory assays of chemotaxis. Since these oligopeptides were produced by bacteria or synthetic analogs of such products, it was suggested that the N-formyl oligopeptides are important chemotactic factors and their receptors are important chemotactic factor receptors that act respectively as signaling and signal-recognizing elements to initiate Inflammation responses in order to defend against bacterial invasion. Further studies cloned a receptor for these N-formyl oligopeptides, FPR1. Two receptors where thereafter discovered and named FPR2 and FPR3 based on the similarity of their genes' predicted amino acid sequence to that of FPR1 rather than on any ability to bind or be activated by the formyl oligopeptides. The latter two receptors were subsequently found to have very different specificities for the formyl oligopeptides and very different functions than those for FPR1. FPR1 is the premiere receptor for the pro-inflammatory actions of formyl peptides.

== Nomenclature ==
Confusingly, there are two nomenclatures for FPR receptors and their genes, the first one used, FPR, FPR1, and FPR2, and its replacement (which corresponds directly to these three respective receptors and their genes), FPR1, FPR2, and FPR3. The latter nomenclature was recommended by the International Union of Basic and Clinical Pharmacology and is used here. Other previously used names for FPR1 are NFPR, and FMLPR; for FPR2 are FPRH1, FPRL1, RFP, LXA4R, ALXR, FPR2/ALX, HM63, FMLPX, FPR2A, and ALX/FPR2 (most recently, ALX/FPR2 is commonly used for FPR2); and for FPR3 are FPRH2, FPRL2, and FMLPY.

== Gene ==
=== Human ===
In early studies, cultured human HL-60 promyelocytes purposely differentiated to granulocytes were used to partially purify and in a series of experiments clone FPR1; an apparent homolog of FPR1, Fpr was also cloned from rabbit neutrophils. The studies indicated that FPR1 is a G protein-coupled receptor that activates cells though a linkage to the pertussis toxin-sensitive Gαi subclass of G proteins, that FPR1 is located on chromosome 19q.13.3, and that this gene consists of two exons, the first of which encodes a 66 base pair 5'-untranslated sequence, the second of which has an intronless open reading frame coding for a protein containing ~354 amino acids; the studies also indicated that cells express multiple formyl peptide receptor mRNA transcripts due to Allelic heterogeneity, alternate Polyadenylation sites, and possibly products of other genes with homology to FPR1. Subsequent studies cloned two other genes with homology to FPR1 viz., FPL2 (originally termed FPR1, FPRH1, or FPRL1) and FPR3 (originally termed FPR2, FPRH2, or FPRL2). FPR2 and FPR3 are composed of 351 and 352 amino acids, respectively, and similar to FPR1 have intronless open reading frames which encode G protein coupled receptors; FPR2 and FPR3 have 66% and 56% amino acid sequence identity with FPR1 and 72% homology to each other. All three genes localize to chromosome 19q.13.3 in the order of FPR1, FPR2, and FPR3 to form a cluster which also includes the gene for another G protein-coupled chemotactic factor receptor, the C5a receptor (also termed CD88), which binds and is activated by complement component 5a (C5a) and GPR77, a second C5a anaphylatoxin chemotactic receptor C5a2 (C5L2), a second C5a receptor of debated function which has the structure of a G protein coupled receptor but fails to couple to G proteins. These points are of interest because C5a is generated by the interaction of bacteria with blood plasma components to activate the complement cascade which then cleave C5a from Complement component 5. Thus, bacteria produce a family of oligopeptide chemotactic factors plus activate host complement pathways to generate C5a, which, like the formylated oligopeptides, is a neutrophil chemotactic factor that operates through receptors whose genes cluster with those for the three formyl peptide receptors. Furthermore, bacteria-induced complement activation also causes the formation of complement component 3a (C3a) by cleavage from complement component 3; C3a is a neutrophil chemotactic factor which operates through a G protein coupled chemotactic factor receptor, the C3a receptor, whose gene is located at chromosome 12p13; C3a also acts through C5L2.

=== Mouse ===
Mouse formyl peptide receptor genes localize to chromosome 17A3.2 in the following order: Fpr1, Fpr-rs2 (or fpr2), Fpr-rs1 (or Lxa4R), Fpr-rs4, Fpr-rs7, Fpr-rs6, and Fpr-rs3; Pseudogenes ψFpr-rs2 and ψFpr-rs3 (or ψFpr-rs5) lie just after Fpr-rs2 and Fpr-rs1, respectively. All of the active mouse FPR receptors have ≥50% amino acid sequence identity with each other as well as with the three human FPR receptors. Studies find that: a) mouse Fpr1 is an ortholog of human FPR1, responding to many bacterial- and mitochondrial-derived formyl peptides but only minimally to FMLP and having certain pharmacologic properties in common with human FPR2/ALX; b) mouse Fpr2 and mFpr-rs1 bind with high affinity and respond to lipoxins but have little affinity for or responsiveness to formyl peptides and therefore share key properties with human FPR2/ALX; and c) based on its predominantly intracellular distribution, mFpr-rs1 correlates, and therefore may share functionally, with human FPR3;

The ψFpr-rs2 gene contains a deletion and frame shift which renders its protein 186 nucleotides shorter but 98% identical to the protein encoded by its closest paralog gene, Fpr-rs2. Since ψFpr-rs2 transcripts are expressed and inducible in multiple mouse tissues and since gene knockout studies ascribe functionality to it, ψFpr-rs2 may not a true pseudogene and, it is suggested, should be renamed Fpr-rs8.

Fpr-rs1, Fpr-rs3, Fpr-rs4, Fpr-rs6, and Fpr-rs7 receptors are expressed in the olfactory bulb sensory neurons of the Vomeronasal organ where they have been shown to respond to their known ligands, FMLP and lipoxin A4. Isolated mouse Olfactory bulb neurons also respond to a range of other fpr agonists. These results suggest that the cited receptors function to allow the olfactory-based detection of various contaminated compounds such as spoiled food and/or their many inflammation-regulating and other agonists in bodily secretions.

==== Gene knockout studies ====
The large number of mouse compared to human FPR receptors makes it difficult to extrapolate human FPR1 functions based on genetic (e.g. gene knockout or forced overexpression) or other experimental manipulations of FPR receptors in mice. In any event, targeted disruption of the Fpr1 gene reduced the ability of mice to survive intravenous injection of the bacterial pathogen, listeria monocytogenes; disruption of the Fpr2 gene in mice produce a similar effect while disruption of both genes further lowered the survival of mice to the listeria challenge. The effect of these gene knockouts appeared due to faulty leukocyte function and other causes leading to a breakdown in the innate immune response. The functions of the human FPR1 receptor may be equivalent to the overlapping functions of the mouse Fpr1 and Fpr2 functions and therefore be critical in the defense against at least certain bacteria. Targeted disruption of FPR-rs1 produced a 33% reduction in the lifetime of mice; there was no specific pathology associated with this reduction.

=== Other species ===
FPR receptors are widely distributed throughout mammalian species with the FPR1, FPR2, and FPR3 paralogs, based on phylogenetic analysis, originating from a common ancestor, early duplication of FPR1, and FPR2/FPR3 splitting with FPR3 originating from the latest duplication event near the origin of primates. Rabbits express an ortholog of FPR1 (78% amino acid sequence identity) with high binding affinity for FMLP; rats express an ortholog of FPR2 (74% amino acid sequence identity) with high affinity for lipoxin A4.

== Cellular and tissue distribution ==
FPR1 is widely expressed by circulating blood neutrophils, eosinophils, basophils, monocytes, and platelets; tissue-bound macrophages, fibroblasts, and immature dendritic cells; vascular endothelial and smooth muscle cells; various types of epithelial cells, liver hepatocytes, neural tissue glial cells, astrocytes and malignant neuroblastoma cells; skin keratinocytes; and virtually all types of multicellular tissues.

== See also ==
- Formyl peptide receptor
