= Eoxin E4 =

Eoxin E_{4}

Names
- IUPAC name (5Z,8Z,10E,12E,14R,15S)-14-{[(2R)-2-Amino-2-carboxyethyl]sulfanyl}-15-hydroxy-5,8,10,12-icosatetraenoic acid
- Other names EXE4; 14,15-LTE4; 14,15-Leukotriene E4

Identifiers
CAS Number	1000852-57-2
3D model (JSmol)	Interactive image
ChEBI	CHEBI:63986
ChemSpider	27471349
PubChem CID	52921882
CompTox Dashboard (EPA)	DTXSID601032109
- InChI: InChI=1S/C23H37NO5S/c1-2-3-12-15-20(25)21(30-18-19(24)23(28)29)16-13-10-8-6-4-5-7-9-11-14-17-22(26)27/h4,6-10,13,16,19-21,25H,2-3,5,11-12,14-15,17-18,24H2,1H3,(H,26,27)(H,28,29)/b6-4-,9-7-,10-8+,16-13+/t19-,20-,21+/m0/s1 Key: JLJNENVYAVKECZ-HRXVJLLUSA-N; InChI=1/C23H37NO5S/c1-2-3-12-15-20(25)21(30-18-19(24)23(28)29)16-13-10-8-6-4-5-7-9-11-14-17-22(26)27/h4,6-10,13,16,19-21,25H,2-3,5,11-12,14-15,17-18,24H2,1H3,(H,26,27)(H,28,29)/b6-4-,9-7-,10-8+,16-13+/t19-,20-,21+/m0/s1 Key: JLJNENVYAVKECZ-HRXVJLLUBX
- SMILES: CCCCC[C@@H]([C@@H](/C=C/C=C/C=C\C/C=C\CCCC(=O)O)SC[C@@H](C(=O)O)N)O

Properties
Chemical formula	C_{23}H_{37}NO_{5}S
Molar mass	439.61 g·mol^{−1}
- Except where otherwise noted, data are given for materials in their standard state (at 25 °C [77 °F], 100 kPa). Infobox references

Eoxin E_{4} (EXE_{4}), also known as 14,15-leukotriene E_{4}, is an eoxin. Cells make eoxins by metabolizing arachidonic acid with a 15-lipoxygenase enzyme to form (15S)-hydroperoxyeicosapentaenoic acid (i.e. 15(S)-HpETE). This product is then converted serially to EXA_{4}, EXC_{4}, EXD_{4}, and EXE_{4} by LTC_{4} synthase, an unidentified gamma-glutamyltransferase, and an unidentified dipeptidase, respectively, in a pathway which appears similar if not identical to the pathway which forms leukotrienes, i.e. LTA_{4}, LTC_{4}, LTD_{4}, and LTE_{4}. This pathway is schematically shown as follows:

Arachidonic acid + O_{2} → 15(S)-HpETE → EXA_{4} → EXC_{4} → EXD_{4} → EXE_{4}

EXA_{4} is viewed as an intracellular-bound, short-lived intermediate which is rapidly metabolized to the downstream eoxins. The eoxins downstream of EXA_{4} are secreted from their parent cells and, it is proposed but not yet proven, serve to regulate allergic responses and the development of certain cancers (see eoxins).
