= Eoxin A4 =

Eoxin A_{4}

Names
- Preferred IUPAC name (5Z,8Z,10E,12E)-13-[(2S,3S)-3-Pentyloxiran-2-yl]trideca-5,8,10,12-tetraenoic acid
- Other names EXa4; 14,15-LTA4

Identifiers
CAS Number	81918-96-9
3D model (JSmol)	Interactive image
ChEBI	CHEBI:63983
ChemSpider	27471348
PubChem CID	52921883
CompTox Dashboard (EPA)	DTXSID801032105
- InChI: InChI=1S/C20H30O3/c1-2-3-12-15-18-19(23-18)16-13-10-8-6-4-5-7-9-11-14-17-20(21)22/h4,6-10,13,16,18-19H,2-3,5,11-12,14-15,17H2,1H3,(H,21,22)/b6-4-,9-7-,10-8+,16-13+/t18-,19-/m0/s1 Key: URDQSJSEGRMOIT-FDMWOPBLSA-N
- SMILES: CCCCC[C@H]1[C@@H](O1)/C=C/C=C/C=C\C/C=C\CCCC(=O)O

Properties
Chemical formula	C_{20}H_{30}O_{3}
Molar mass	318.457 g·mol^{−1}
- Except where otherwise noted, data are given for materials in their standard state (at 25 °C [77 °F], 100 kPa). Infobox references

Eoxin A_{4} (EXA_{4}), also known as 14,15-leukotriene A_{4}, is an eoxin. Cells make eoxins by metabolizing arachidonic acid with a 15-lipoxygenase enzyme to form (15S)-hydroperoxyeicosapentaenoic acid (i.e. 15(S)-HpETE). This product is then converted serially to EXA_{4}, EXC_{4}, EXD_{4}, and EXE_{4} by LTC_{4} synthase, an unidentified gamma-glutamyltransferase, and an unidentified dipeptidase, respectively, in a pathway which appears similar if not identical to the pathway which forms leukotrienes, i.e. LTA_{4}, LTC_{4}, LTD_{4}, and LTE_{4}. This pathway is schematically shown as follows:

Arachidonic acid + O_{2} → 15(S)-HpETE → EXA_{4} → EXC_{4} → EXD_{4} → EXE_{4}

EXA_{4} is viewed as an intracellular-bound, short-lived intermediate which is rapidly metabolized to the downstream eoxins. The eoxins downstream of EXA_{4} are secreted from their parent cells and, it is proposed but not yet proven, serve to regulate allergic responses and the development of certain cancers (see eoxins).
