= 15-Hydroxyeicosatetraenoic acid =

Names
- Preferred IUPAC name (5Z,8Z,11Z,13E,15S)-15-Hydroxyicosa-5,8,11,13-tetraenoic acid
- Other names 15-HETE, 15(S)-HETE, 15(S)-HETE

Identifiers
| CAS Number | 54845-95-3 |
| 3D model (JSmol) | Interactive image |
| ChemSpider | 4444307 |
| ECHA InfoCard | 100.214.805 |
| IUPHAR/BPS | 3401 |
| PubChem CID | 5280724 |
| UNII | 44JHK6G39Q |
- InChI: InChI=1S/C20H32O3/c1-2-3-13-16-19(21)17-14-11-9-7-5-4-6-8-10-12-15-18-20(22)23/h4-5,8-11,14,17,19,21H,2-3,6-7,12-13,15-16,18H2,1H3,(H,22,23)/b5-4-,10-8-,11-9-,17-14+/t19-/m0/s1 Key: JSFATNQSLKRBCI-VAEKSGALSA-N
- SMILES: CCCCC[C@@H](/C=C/C=C\C/C=C\C/C=C\CCCC(=O)O)O

Properties
| Chemical formula | C_{20}H_{32}O_{3} |
| Molar mass | 320.473 g·mol^{−1} |
- Except where otherwise noted, data are given for materials in their standard state (at 25 °C [77 °F], 100 kPa). Infobox references

15-Hydroxyeicosatetraenoic acid (also termed 15-HETE, 15(S)-HETE, and 15S-HETE) is an eicosanoid, i.e. a metabolite of arachidonic acid. Various cell types metabolize arachidonic acid to 15(S)-hydroperoxyeicosatetraenoic acid (15(S)-HpETE). This initial hydroperoxide product is extremely short-lived in cells: if not otherwise metabolized, it is rapidly reduced to 15(S)-HETE. Both of these metabolites, depending on the cell type which forms them, can be further metabolized to 15-oxo-eicosatetraenoic acid (15-oxo-ETE), 5(S),15(S)-dihydroxy-eicosatetraenoic acid (5(S),15(S)-diHETE), 5-oxo-15(S)-hydroxyeicosatetraenoic acid (5-oxo-15(S)-HETE), a subset of specialized pro-resolving mediators viz., the lipoxins, a class of pro-inflammatory mediators, the eoxins, and other products that have less well-defined activities and functions. Thus, 15(S)-HETE and 15(S)-HpETE, in addition to having intrinsic biological activities, are key precursors to numerous biologically active derivatives.

Some cell types (e.g. platelets) metabolize arachidonic acid to the stereoisomer of 15(S)-HpETE, 15(R)-HpETE. Both stereoisomers may also be formed as result of the metabolism of arachidonic acid by cellular microsomes or as a result of arachidonic acid auto-oxidation. Similar to 15(S)-HpETEs, 15(R)-HpETE may be rapidly reduced to 15(R)-HETE. These R,S stereoisomers differ only in having their hydroxy residue in opposite orientations. While the two R stereoisomers are sometimes referred to as 15-HpETE and 15-HETE, proper usage should identify them as R stereoisomers. 15(R)-HpETE and 15(R)-HETE lack some of the activity attributed to their S stereoisomers but can be further metabolized to bioactive products viz., the 15(R) class of lipoxins (also termed epi-lipoxins).

15(S)-HETE, 15(S)-HpETE, and many of their derivative metabolites are thought to have physiologically important functions. They appear to act as hormone-like autocrine and paracrine signaling agents that are involved in regulating inflammatory and perhaps other responses. Clinically, drugs that are stable analogs, and therefore mimic the anti-inflammatory actions of the lipoxins and drugs that block the production or actions of the pro-inflammatory eoxins may prove useful for treating acute and chronic inflammatory disorders.

== Nomenclature and stereoisomers ==
15(S)-HETE is unambiguously designated by a shortened version of its IUPAC name viz., 15(S)-hydroxy-5Z,8Z,11Z,13E-eicosatetraenoic acid. In this terminology S refers to the absolute configuration of the chirality of the hydroxy functional group at carbon position 15. Its 15(R) enantiomer is designated 15(R)-hydroxy-5Z,8Z,11Z,13E-eicosatetraenoic acid. Z and E give the cis–trans isomerism about each double bond at carbon positions 5, 8, 11, and 13 with Z indicating cis and E indicating trans isomerism. Both stereoisomers are produced from their corresponding S and R 15-HpETE stereoisomers, i.e. 15(S)-hydroperoxy-5Z,8Z,11Z,13E-eicosatetraenoic acid (15(S)-HpETE) and 15(R)-hydroperoxy-5Z,8Z,11Z,13E-eicosatetraenoic acid (15(R)-HpETE).

== Production ==
Human cells release arachidonic acid (i.e. 5Z,8Z,11Z,14Z-eicosatetraenoic acid) from its storage site in phospholipids by reactions that involve phospholipase C and/or lipase enzymes. This release is stimulated or enhanced by cell stimulation. The freed arachidonic acid is then converted to 15-hydroperoxy/hydroxy products by one or more of the following five pathways.

15-Lipoxygenase-1: Cells metabolize arachidonic acid with 15-lipoxygenase-1 (i.e., 15-LO-1, ALOX15) to form 15(S)-HpETE as a major product and 12(S)-hydroperoxy-5Z,8Z,10E,15Z-eicosatetraenoic acid (12(S)-HpETE) and 14(S),15(S)-trans-oxido-5Z,8Z,11Z-14,15-leukotriene A4 as minor products; 15(S)-HpETE and 12(S)-HpETE are rapidly converted to 15(S)-HETE and 12(S)-hydroxy-5Z,8Z,10E,15Z-eicosatetraenoic acid (12(S)-hydroxyeicosatetraenoic acid), (i.e. 12(S)-HETE), respectively, or further metabolized through other enzyme pathways; 14(S),15(S)-trans-oxido-5Z,8Z,11Z-14,15-leukotriene A_{4} is metabolized by 15-LO-1 to various isomers of 8,15(S)-dihydroxy-5S,8S,11Z,13S-eicosatetraenoic acids, e.g. 8,15(S)-LTB_{4}'s.

15-Lipoxygenase-2: Cells also used 15-lipoxygenase 2 (i.e. 15-LOX-2 or ALOX15B) to make 15(S)-HpETE and 15(S)-HETE. However this enzyme has a preference for metabolizing linoleic acid rather than arachidonic acid. It therefore forms linoleic acid metabolites (e.g. 13-hydoxyperoxy/hydroxy-octadecadienoic and 9-hydroperoxy/hydroxyl-octadecadienoic acids) in greater amounts than 15(S)-HpETE and 15(S)-HETE. 15-LOX-2 also differs from 15-LOX-1 in that it does not make 12(S)-HpETE or the leukotriene A_{4} isomer cited above.

Cyclooxygenase: Cells can use prostaglandin-endoperoxide synthase 1 (i.e. cyclooxygenenase-1 or COX-1) and prostaglandin-endoperoxide synthase 2 (COX-2) to metabolize arachidonic acid primarily to prostaglandins but also to small amounts of 11(R)-HETE and a racemic mixture of 15-HETEs composed of ~22% 15(R)-HETE and ~78% 15(S)-HETE. When pretreated with aspirin, however, COX-1 is inactive while COX-2 attacks arachidonic acid to produce almost exclusively 15(R)-HETE along with its presumed precursor 15(R)-HpETE.

Microsome metabolism: Human and rat microsomal cytochrome P450s, e.g. CYP2C19, metabolize arachidonic acid to a racemic mixture of 15-HETEs, i.e., 15(R,S)-HETEs, >90% of which is the 15(R) stereoisomer.

Autoxidation: The spontaneous and non-enzymatically induced autoxidation of arachidonic acid yields 15(R,S)-hydroperoxy-5Z,8Z,11Z,13E-eicosatetraenoic acids. This non-enzymatic reaction is promoted in cells undergoing oxidative stress. Cells forming this racemic mixture of 15-hydroperoxy products may convert then to 15(R,S)-HETEs and other products. However, the uncontrolled overproduction of the 15-hydroperoxy products may react with other elements to produce cell injury.

== Further metabolism ==
The newly formed products formed by the pathways cited in the previous section are bioactive but may also flow into down-stream pathways to form other metabolites with a different sets of bioactivity. The initially formed 15(S)-HpETE may be further metabolized by its parent cell or pass it to nearby cell by a process termed transcellular metabolism.

15(S)-HpETE may be:

- Rapidly reduced to 15(S)-HETE by ubiquitous cellular peroxidase reactions including those possessed by prostaglandin-endoperoxide synthase-1 and -2, prostacyclin synthase, thromboxane synthase, and various glutathione peroxidases.
- Acylated into membrane phospholipids, particularly phosphatidylinositols and phosphatidylethanolamine. The 15(S)-HpETE is bound primarily at the sn-2 position of these phospholipids (see Phospholipase) and may be reduced to 15(S)-HETE thereby forming their 15(S)-HETE-bound phospholipoid analogs. Phosphatidylinositol phospholipids with 15(S)-HETE in the sn-2 position can be attacked by phospholipase C to form corresponding diglycerides with 15(S)-HETE at their sn-2 positions.
- Metabolized by 15-LO-1 to its 14,15-trans-epoxide, 14,15-trans-epoxide-oxido-5Z,8Z,10E,13E-eicosatetraenoic acid (i.e., eoxin A_{4} or EXA_{4}), and thereafter to 14(R)-glutothionyl-15(S)-hydroxy-5Z,8Z,10E,13E-eicosatetraenoic acid (i.e. eoxin C_{4} or EXC_{4}) by leukotriene C4 synthase. EXC_{4} contains glutathione (i.e. γ-L-glutamyl-L-cysteinylglycine) bound in the R configuration to carbon 14. EXC_{4} is further metabolized by removal of the γ-L-glutamyl residue to form EXD_{4} which is in turn further metabolized by removal of the glycine residue to form EXE_{4}. These metabolic transformations are similar to those in the pathway that metabolizes arachidonic acid to LTA_{4}, LTC_{4}, LTD_{4}, and LTE_{4} and presumed to be conducted by the same enzymes (Eoxins are also termed 14,15-leukotrienes or 14,15-LTs).
- Metabolized alternatively by 15-LO-1 to various 8,15-diHETEs including the two 8(R) and 8(S) diastereomers of 8,15(S)-dihydroxy-5,9,11,13-eicosatetraenoic acid (8,15-leukotrienes B4) and to two isomeric erythro-14,15-dihydroxy-5-cis-8,10,12-eicosatetraenoic acids (14,15-leukotrienes B4).
- Metabolized by 15-LOX-2 to 11(S)-hydroxy-14(S),15(S)-epoxy-5(Z),8(Z),12(E)-eicosatrienoic acid and 13(R)-hydroxy-14(S),15(S)-epoxy-5(Z),8(Z),11(Z)-eicosatrienoic acid; these two products are novel hepoxilins produced by ALOX15 rather than ALOX12, the enzyme responsible for making the various other hepoxilins in humans. The two novel hepoxilins are termed respectively 14,15-HXA_{3} and 14,15-HXB_{3}. 14,15-HXA_{3} can be further metabolized by glutathione transferases to 11(S),15(S)-dihydroxy-14(R)-glutathionyl-(5Z),8(Z),12(E)-eicosatrienoic acid (14,15-HXA_{3}C) which is then further metabolized to 11(S),15(S)-dihydroxy-14(R)-cysteinyl-glycyl-(5Z),8(Z),12(E)-eicosatrienoic acid (14,15-HXA_{3}D).
- Isomerized to 15(S)-hydroxy-11,12-cis-epoxy-5Z,8Z,13E-eicosatrienoic acid (i.e., 15-H-11,12-EETA) by a hydroperoxide isomerase activity and then to 11,12,15-trihydroxy-5Z,8Z,12E-eicosatrienoic acid (i.e. 11,12,15-THETA) and 11,14,15-trihydroxy-5Z,8Z,12E-eicosatrienoic acid (i.e., 11,14,15-THETA) by a soluble epoxide hydrolase activity or, by acid in a non-enzymatic reaction (the R, S configuration of the hydroxy residues in the latter two metabolites has not been defined).
- Isomerized to threo and erythro diastereoisomers of 13-hydroxy-14,15-cis-epoxy-5Z,8Z,11Z-eicosatrienoic acid (i.e., 15-H-11,12-EETA) by a hydroperoxide isomerase activity, possibly a cytochrome P450, i.e. CYP2J2.
- Metabolized by cytochrome P450 (CYP) enzymes such as CYP1A1, CYP1A2, CYP1B1, and CYP2S1 to 15-oxo-ETE.
- Metabolized in skin epidermis by epidermis-type lipoxygenase 3 (eLOX3, encoded by the ALOXE3 gene) to make two products, hepoxilin A3 (HxA3, i.e., 13R-hydroxy-14(S),15(S)-epoxy-5Z,8Z,11Z-eicosatetraenoic acid) and 15-oxo-ETE).
- Converted to its 14,15-epoxide derivative, eoxin A4, and further metabolized to eoxin C4, eoxin D4, and eoxin E4 (there is no eoxin B4).
- Degraded non-enzymatically to various cell-injuring electrophiles such as 4-hydroxy-2(E)-nonenal and 4-oxo-2(E)-nonenal.

15(S)-HETE may be:

- Oxidized to its keto analog, 15-oxo-ETE, by the same enzyme that converts prostaglandins of the A, E, and F series to their 15-keto analogs viz., NAD^{+}-dependent 15-hydroxyprostaglandin dehydrogenase; 15-oxo-ETE, similar to 15(S)-HETE, may be acylated into membrane phosphatidylethanolamine or, similar to 15(S)-HpETE, conjugated with glutathione to form a 13-cysteinyl-glycyl-glutamine adduct viz., 13-glutatione,15-oxo-5(S),8(Z),11(E)-eicosatrienoic acid; the latter metabolite is attacked by γ-glutamyl-transferase to form 13-cysteinyl-glycine,15-oxo-5(S),8(Z),11(E)-eicosatrienoic acid.
- Acylated into membrane phospholipids, particularly phosphatidylinositol and phosphatidylethanolamine. Phospholipid products contain this 15(S)-HETE most likely at the sn-2 position. 15(S)-HETE-containing-phospholipids may also be made directly by the action of 15-LO-1 on membrane phosphatidylinositols or phosphatidylethanolamines containing arachidonic acid at the sn-2 positions. The phosphatidylethanolamine-bound 15-HETE may be converted to phosphatidylethanolamine-bound 15-oxo-ETE.
- Oxygenated by 5-lipoxygenase (ALOX5) to form its 5,6-trans epoxide derivative which may then rearrange to the lipoxins (LX), LXA_{4} (i.e. 5(S),6(R),15(S)-trihydroxy-7E,9E,11Z,13E-eicosatetraenoic acid) and LXB_{4} (i.e., 5(S),14(R),15(S)-trihydroxy-6E,8Z,10E,12E-eicosatetraenoic acid) or to 5(S),15(S)-dihydroperoxy-6E,8Z,11Z,13E-eicosatetraenoate (i.e., 5(S),15(S)-diHETE). 5(S),15(S)-diHETE may then be oxidized to 5-oxo-15(S)-hydroxy-6E,8Z,11Z,13E-eicosatetraenoate (i.e., 5-oxo-15(S)-hydroxy-ETE). The latter two metabolites may also be made by 15-LO's metabolism of 5-hydroxyeicosatetraenoic acid (i.e. 5-HETE) and 5-oxo-eicosatetraenoic acid (i.e. 5-oxo-ETE), respectively.

15(R)-HpETE may be:

- Reduced to 15(R)-HETE by the same pathway that reduces 5(S)-HpETE to 15(S)-HETE.
- Similar to 15(S)-HpETE, subject to decomposition to form various bifuctional potentially toxic electrophiles such as 4-hydroxy-2(E)-nonenal and 4-oxo-2(E)-nonenal.

15(R)-HETE may be:

- Similar to 15(S)-HETE, oxidized by NAD-dependent 5-hydroxyprostaglandin dehydrogenase to form 15-oxo-ETE which product can be converted its 13-cysteinyl-glycyl-glutamyl and then 13-cysteinyl-glycine products as described above for 5(S)-HETE.
- Similar to 15(S)-HETE, oxygenated by ALOX5 to form its 5,6-oxido derivative which then rearranges to the 15(R) diastereomers of LXA_{4} and (LXB_{4} viz., 15-epi-LXA_{4} 5(S),6(R),15(R)-trihydroxy-7E,9E,11Z,13E-eicosatetraenoic acid) and 15-epi-LXB_{4} (i.e., 5(S),14(R),15(S)-trihydroxy-6E,8Z,10E,12E-eicosatetraenoic acid, respectively.

== Activities ==
=== 15(S)-HpETE and 15(S)-HETE ===
Most studies have analyzed the action of 15(S)-HETE but not that of its less stable precursor 15(S)-HpETE. Since this precursor is rapidly converted to 15(S)-HETE in cells, it is likely that the two metabolites share similar activities. In many studies, however, is not clear that these activities reflect their intrinsic action or reflect their conversion to the metabolites sited above.

15(S)-HpETE and 15(S)-HETE bind to and activate the G protein-coupled receptor, leukotriene B4 receptor 2, i.e. BLT2. This receptor activation may mediate, at least in part, certain cell-stimulating activities of the two metabolites. BLT2 may be responsible in part or whole for mediating the growth-promoting and anti-apoptosis (i.e. anti-cell death) activities of 15(S)-HETE in cultured human breast cancer cells; human cancer colon cells, human hepatocellular HepG2 and SMMC7721 cancer cells; mouse 3T3 cells (a fibroblast cell line); rat PA adventitia fibroblasts; baby hamster kidney cells; and diverse types of vascular endothelial cells. These growth-stimulating effects could contribute to the progression of the cited cancer types in animal models or even humans and the excess fibrosis that causes the narrowing of pulmonary arteries in hypoxia-induced pulmonary hypertension or narrowing of portal arteries in the portal hypertension accompanying liver cirrhosis. 15(S)-HETE may also act through BLT2 to stimulate an immediate contractile response in rat pulmonary arteries and its angiogenic effect on human umbilical and dermal vascular endothelial cells.

15(S)-HpETE and 15(S)-HETE also directly bind with and activate peroxisome proliferator-activated receptor gamma. This activation may contribute to the ability of 15(S)-HETE to inhibit the growth of cultured human prostate cancer PC-3, LNCaP, and DU145 cell lines and non-malignant human prostate cells; lung adenocarcinoma A549 cells; human colorectal cancer cells; corneal epithelial cells; and Jurkat T-cell leukemia cells. The decline in the level of 15(S)-HpETE-forming enzymes and consequential fall in cellular 15-HETE production that occurs in human prostate cancer cells may be one mechanism by which this and perhaps other human cancer cells (e.g. those of the colon, rectum, and lung) avoid the apoptosis-inducing actions of 15(S)-HpETE and/or 15(S)-HETE and thereby proliferate and spread. In this scenario, 15(S)-HETE and one of its forming enzymes, particularly 15-LOX-2, appear to act as tumor suppressors.

Some of the inhibitory effects of 15(S)-HpETE and 15(S)-HETE, particularly when induced by high concentrations (e.g. >1-10 micromolar), may be due to a less specific mechanism: 15(S)-HpETE and to a lesser extent 15(S)-HETE induce the generation of reactive oxygen species. These species trigger cells to activate their death programs, i.e. apoptosis, and/or are openly toxic to the cells. 15(S)-HpETE and 15(S)-HETE inhibit angiogenesis and the growth of cultured human chronic myelogenous leukemia K-562 cells by a mechanism that is associated with the production of reactive oxygen species.

Several bifunctional electrophilic breakdown products of 15(S)-HpETE, e.g. 4-hydroxy-2(E)-nonenal, 4-hydroperoxy-2(E)-nonenal, 4-oxo-2(E)-nonenal, and cis-4,5-epoxy-2(E)-decanal, are mutagens in mammalian cells and thereby may contripute to the development and/or progression of human cancers.

=== 15(R)-HETE ===
Similar to 15(S)-HpETE and 15(S)-HETE and with similar potency, 15(R)-HETE binds with and activates peroxisome proliferator-activated receptor gamma. The precursor of 15(R)-HETE, 15(R)-HpETE may, similar to 15(S)-HpETE, break down to the mutagenic products 4-hydroxy-2(E)-nonenal, 4-hydroperoxy-2(E)-nonenal, 4-oxo-2(E)-nonenal, and cis-4,5-epoxy-2(E)-decanal and therefore be involved in cancer development and/or progression.

=== 15-Oxo-ETE ===
In cultured human monocytes of the THP1 cell line, 15-oxo-ETE inactivates IKKβ (also known as IKK2) thereby blocking this cell's NF-κB-mediated pro-inflammatory responses (e.g. lipopolysaccharide-induced production of TNFα, interleukin 6, and IL1B) while concurrently activating anti-oxidant responses upregulated through the anti-oxidant response element (ARE) by forcing cytosolic KEAP1 to release NFE2L2 which then moves to the nucleus, binds ARE, and induces production of, e.g. hemoxygenase-1, NADPH-quinone oxidoreductase, and possibly glutamate-cysteine ligase modifier. By these actions, 15-oxo-ETE may dampen inflammatory and/or oxidative stress responses. In a cell-free system, 15-oxo-ETE is a moderately potent (IC_{50}=1 μM) inhibitor of 12-lipoxygenase but not other human lipoxygenases. This effect could also have anti-inflammatory and anti-oxidative effects by blocking the formation of 12-HETE and hepoxilins. 15-Oxo-ETE is an example of an α,β unsaturated ketone electrophile. These ketones are highly reactive with nucleophiles, adducting to, for example, the cysteines in transcription and transcription-related regulatory factors and enzymes to form their alkylated and thereby often inactivated products. It is presumed that the preceding activities of 15-oxo-ETE reflect its adduction to the indicated elements. 15-Oxo-ETE, at 2-10 μM, also inhibits the proliferation of cultured human umbilical vein endothelial cells and LoVo human colorectal cancer cells and at the extremely high concentration of 100 μM inhibits the proliferation of cultured MBA-MD-231 and MCF7 breast cancer cells as well as SKOV3 ovarian cancer cells. They may use a similar "protein-adduction" mechanism; if so the target protein(s) for these effects have not been defined or even suggested. This 15-oxo-ETE action may prove to inhibit the remodeling of blood vessels and reduce the growth of the cited cell types and cancers. At sub-micromolar concentrations, 15-oxo-ETE has weak chemotaxis activity for human monocytes and could serve to recruit this white blood cell into inflammatory responses.

=== 5-Oxo-15(S)-hydroxy-ETE ===
5-Oxo-15(S)-hydroxy-ETE is properly a member of the 5-HETE family of agonists which binds to the oxoeicosanoid receptor 1, a G protein-coupled receptor, to activate its various target cells. As such, it is a potent stimulator of leukocytes, particularly eosinophils, as well as other OXE1-bearing cells including MDA-MB-231, MCF7, and SKOV3 cancer cells (see 5-Hydroxyicosatetraenoic acid and 5-Oxo-eicosatetraenoic acid). It also binds with and activates PPARγ and thereby can stimulate or inhibit cells independently of OXE1.

=== Lipoxins ===
LXA4, LXB4, AT-LXA4, and AT-LXB4 are specialized proresolving mediators, i.e. they potently inhibit the progression and contribute to the resolution of diverse inflammatory and allergic reactions.

=== Eoxins ===
Eoxin A4, eoxin C4, eoxin D4, and eoxin E4 are analogs of leukotriene A4, C4, leukotriene D4, and E4. Formation of the leukotrienes is initiated by 5-lipoxygenase metabolism of arachidonic acid to form a 5,6-epoxide viz, leukotriene A4; the latter metabolite is then converted to C4, D4, and E4 in succession. Formation of the eoxins is initiated by a 15-lipoxyenase-mediated metabolism of arachiconic acid to a 14,15-epoxide, eoxin A4 followed by its serial conversion to epoxins C4, D4, and E4 using the same pathways and enzymes that metabolize leukotriene A4 to its down-stream products. Preliminary studies have found that the eoxins have pro-inflammatory actions, suggest that they are involved in severe asthma, aspirin-induced asthma attacks, and perhaps other allergic reactions. The production of eoxins by Reed-Sternburg cells has also led to suggestion that they are involve in the lymphoma of Hodgkins disease. Drugs blocking the 15-lipoxygenases may be useful for inhibiting inflammation by reducing the production of the eoxins.

== See also ==
- Epi-lipoxin
- Eoxin
- Specialized pro-resolving mediators
