= Eoxin C4 =

Eoxin C_{4}

Names
- IUPAC name L-γ-Glutamyl-S-[(6S,7R,8E,10E,12Z,15Z)-19-carboxy-6-hydroxy-8,10,12,15-nonadecatetraen-7-yl]-L-cysteinylglycine

Identifiers
CAS Number	75290-60-7
3D model (JSmol)	Interactive image
ChEBI	CHEBI:63984
ChemSpider	24822073
PubChem CID	42607303
UNII	N66RU463NK
CompTox Dashboard (EPA)	DTXSID501032106
- InChI: InChI=1S/C30H47N3O9S/c1-2-3-12-15-24(34)25(16-13-10-8-6-4-5-7-9-11-14-17-27(36)37)43-21-23(29(40)32-20-28(38)39)33-26(35)19-18-22(31)30(41)42/h4,6-10,13,16,22-25,34H,2-3,5,11-12,14-15,17-21,31H2,1H3,(H,32,40)(H,33,35)(H,36,37)(H,38,39)(H,41,42)/b6-4-,9-7-,10-8+,16-13+/t22-,23-,24-,25+/m0/s1 Key: OBQVBASHEWLKCQ-PKBWNXTMSA-N
- SMILES: CCCCC[C@@H]([C@@H](/C=C/C=C/C=C\C/C=C\CCCC(=O)O)SC[C@@H](C(=O)NCC(=O)O)NC(=O)CC[C@@H](C(=O)O)N)O

Properties
Chemical formula	C_{30}H_{47}N_{3}O_{9}S
Molar mass	625.78 g·mol^{−1}
- Except where otherwise noted, data are given for materials in their standard state (at 25 °C [77 °F], 100 kPa). Infobox references

Eoxin C_{4} (EXC_{4}), also known as 14,15-leukotriene C_{4}, is an eoxin. Cells make eoxins by metabolizing arachidonic acid with a 15-lipoxygenase enzyme to form (15S)-hydroperoxyeicosapentaenoic acid (i.e. 15(S)-HpETE). This product is then converted serially to EXA_{4}, EXC_{4}, EXD_{4}, and EXE_{4} by LTC_{4} synthase, an unidentified gamma-glutamyltransferase, and an unidentified dipeptidase, respectively, in a pathway which appears similar if not identical to the pathway which forms leukotrienes, i.e. LTA_{4}, LTC_{4}, LTD_{4}, and LTE_{4}. This pathway is schematically shown as follows:

Arachidonic acid + O_{2} → 15(S)-HpETE → EXA_{4} → EXC_{4} → EXD_{4} → EXE_{4}

EXA_{4} is viewed as an intracellular-bound, short-lived intermediate which is rapidly metabolized to the downstream eoxins. The eoxins downstream of EXA_{4} are secreted from their parent cells and, it is proposed but not yet proven, serve to regulate allergic responses and the development of certain cancers (see eoxins).
