= Eoxin D4 =

Eoxin D_{4}

Names
- IUPAC name S-[(6S,7R,8E,10E,12Z,15Z)-19-Carboxy-6-hydroxy-8,10,12,15-nonadecatetraen-7-yl]-L-cysteinylglycine
- Other names 14,15-Leukotriene D4; 14,15-LTD4

Identifiers
CAS Number	75290-64-1
3D model (JSmol)	Interactive image
ChEBI	CHEBI:63985
ChemSpider	24822074
PubChem CID	42607304
CompTox Dashboard (EPA)	DTXSID901032108
- InChI: InChI=1S/C25H40N2O6S/c1-2-3-12-15-21(28)22(34-19-20(26)25(33)27-18-24(31)32)16-13-10-8-6-4-5-7-9-11-14-17-23(29)30/h4,6-10,13,16,20-22,28H,2-3,5,11-12,14-15,17-19,26H2,1H3,(H,27,33)(H,29,30)(H,31,32)/b6-4-,9-7-,10-8+,16-13+/t20-,21-,22+/m0/s1 Key: BUTLPEVGZIRJOA-SPCGXPCUSA-N
- SMILES: CCCCC[C@@H]([C@@H](/C=C/C=C/C=C\C/C=C\CCCC(=O)O)SC[C@@H](C(=O)NCC(=O)O)N)O

Properties
Chemical formula	C_{25}H_{40}N_{2}O_{6}S
Molar mass	496.66 g·mol^{−1}
- Except where otherwise noted, data are given for materials in their standard state (at 25 °C [77 °F], 100 kPa). Infobox references

Eoxin D_{4} (EXD_{4}), also known as 14,15-leukotriene D_{4}, is an eoxin. Cells make eoxins by metabolizing arachidonic acid with a 15-lipoxygenase enzyme to form (15S)-hydroperoxyeicosapentaenoic acid (i.e. 15(S)-HpETE). This product is then converted serially to EXA_{4}, EXC_{4}, EXD_{4}, and EXE_{4} by LTC_{4} synthase, an unidentified gamma-glutamyltransferase, and an unidentified dipeptidase, respectively, in a pathway which appears similar if not identical to the pathway which forms leukotrienes, i.e. LTA_{4}, LTC_{4}, LTD_{4}, and LTE_{4}. This pathway is schematically shown as follows:

Arachidonic acid + O_{2} → 15(S)-HpETE → EXA_{4} → EXC_{4} → EXD_{4} → EXE_{4}

EXA_{4} is viewed as an intracellular-bound, short-lived intermediate which is rapidly metabolized to the downstream eoxins. The eoxins downstream of EXA_{4} are secreted from their parent cells and, it is proposed but not yet proven, serve to regulate allergic responses and the development of certain cancers (see eoxins).
