= 5-Hydroxyeicosatetraenoic acid =

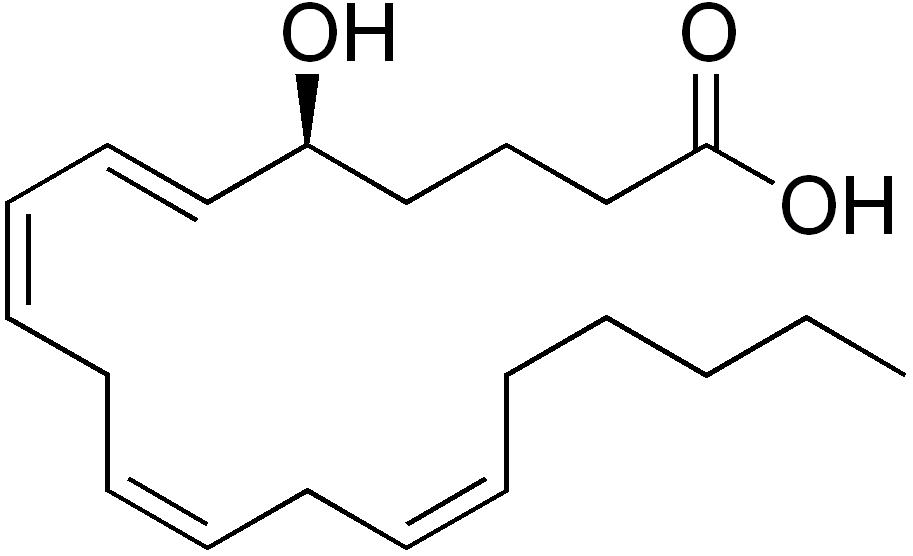

Names
- Preferred IUPAC name (5S,6E,8Z,11Z,14Z)-5-Hydroxyicosa-6,8,11,14-tetraenoic acid
- Other names 5-HETE, 5(S)-HETE

Identifiers
CAS Number	70608-72-9
3D model (JSmol)	Interactive image; Interactive image
ChEBI	CHEBI:28209
ChEMBL	ChEMBL164813
ChemSpider	4444314
ECHA InfoCard	100.161.309
IUPHAR/BPS	3390
PubChem CID	5280733
UNII	467RNW8T91
CompTox Dashboard (EPA)	DTXSID701017281
- InChI: InChI=1S/C20H32O3/c1-2-3-4-5-6-7-8-9-10-11-12-13-14-16-19(21)17-15-18-20(22)23/h6-7,9-10,12-14,16,19,21H,2-5,8,11,15,17-18H2,1H3,(H,22,23)/b7-6-,10-9-,13-12-,16-14+/t19-/m1/s1 Key: KGIJOOYOSFUGPC-JGKLHWIESA-N; InChI=1/C20H32O3/c1-2-3-4-5-6-7-8-9-10-11-12-13-14-16-19(21)17-15-18-20(22)23/h6-7,9-10,12-14,16,19,21H,2-5,8,11,15,17-18H2,1H3,(H,22,23)/b7-6-,10-9-,13-12-,16-14+/t19-/m1/s1 Key: KGIJOOYOSFUGPC-JGKLHWIEBQ
- SMILES: CCCCC/C=C\C/C=C\C/C=C\C=C\[C@H](CCCC(=O)O)O; O=C(O)CCC[C@H](O)/C=C/C=C\C\C=C/C\C=C/CCCCC

Properties
Chemical formula	C_{20}H_{32}O_{3}
Molar mass	320.473 g·mol^{−1}
- Except where otherwise noted, data are given for materials in their standard state (at 25 °C [77 °F], 100 kPa). verify (what is ?) Infobox references

5-Hydroxyeicosatetraenoic acid (5-HETE, 5(S)-HETE, or 5S-HETE) is an eicosanoid, i.e. a metabolite of arachidonic acid. It is produced by diverse cell types in humans and other animal species. These cells may then metabolize the formed 5(S)-HETE to 5-oxo-eicosatetraenoic acid (5-oxo-ETE), 5(S),15(S)-dihydroxyeicosatetraenoic acid (5(S),15(S)-diHETE), or 5-oxo-15-hydroxyeicosatetraenoic acid (5-oxo-15(S)-HETE).

5(S)-HETE, 5-oxo-ETE, 5(S),15(S)-diHETE, and 5-oxo-15(S)-HETE, while differing in potencies, share a common mechanism for activating cells and a common set of activities. They are therefore a family of structurally related metabolites. Animal studies and a limited set of human studies suggest that this family of metabolites serve as hormone-like autocrine and paracrine signalling agents that contribute to the up-regulation of acute inflammatory and allergic responses. In this capacity, these metabolites may be members of the innate immune system.

In vitro studies suggest that 5(S)-HETE and/or other of its family members may also be active in promoting the growth of certain types of cancers, in simulating bone reabsorption, in signaling for the secretion of aldosterone and progesterone, in triggering parturition, and in contributing to other responses in animals and humans. However, the roles of 5(S)-HETE family members in these responses as well as in inflammation and allergy are unproven and will require much further study.

Among the 5(S)-HETE family members, 5(S)-HETE takes precedence over the other members of this family because it was the first to be discovered and has been studied far more thoroughly. However, 5-oxo-ETE is the most potent member of this family and therefore may be its critical member with respect to physiology and pathology. 5-OxoETE has gained attention in recent studies.

== Nomenclature ==
5-Hydroxyeicosatetraenoic acid is more properly termed 5(S)-hydroxyicosatetraenoic acid or 5(S)-HETE) to signify the (S) configuration of its 5-hydroxy residue as opposed to its 5(R)-hydroxyicosatetraenoic acid (i.e., 5(R)-HETE) stereoisomer. Since 5(R)-HETE was rarely considered in the early literature, 5(S)-HETE was frequently termed 5-HETE. This practice occasionally continues. 5(S)-HETE's IUPAC name, (5S,6E,8Z,11Z,14Z)-5-hydroxyicosa-6,8,11,14-tetraenoic acid, defines 5(S)-HETE's structure unambiguously by notating not only its S-hydroxyl chirality but also the cis–trans isomerism geometry for each of its 4 double bonds; E signifies trans and Z signifies cis double bond geometry. The literature commonly uses an alternate but still unambiguous name for 5(S)-HETE viz., 5(S)-hydroxy-6E,8Z,11Z,14Z-eicosatetraenoic acid.

== History of discovery ==
The Nobel laureate, Bengt I. Samuelsson, and colleagues first described 5(S)-HETE in 1976 as a metabolite of arachidonic acid made by rabbit neutrophils. Biological activity was linked to it several years later when it was found to stimulate human neutrophil rises in cytosolic calcium, chemotaxis, and increases in their cell surface adhesiveness as indicated by their aggregation to each other. Since a previously discovered arachidonic acid metabolite made by neutrophils, leukotriene B4 (LTB_{4}), also stimulates human neutrophil calcium rises, chemotaxis, and auto-aggregation and is structurally similar to 5(S)-HETE in being a 5(S)-hydroxy-eicosateraenoate, it was assumed that 5(S)-HETE stimulated cells through the same cell surface receptors as those used by LTB_{4} viz., the leukotriene B4 receptors. However, further studies in neutrophils indicated that 5(S)-HETE acts through a receptor distinct from that used by LTB_{4} as well as various other neutrophil stimuli. This 5(S)-HETE receptor is termed the oxoeicosanoid receptor 1 (abbreviated as OXER1).

== 5(S)-HETE production ==
5(S)-HETE is a product of the cellular metabolism of the n-6 polyunsaturated fatty acid, arachidonic acid (i.e. 5Z,8Z,11Z,14Z-eicosatetraenoic acid), by ALOX5 (also termed arachidonate-5-lipoxygenase, 5-lipoxygenase, 5-LO, and 5-LOX). ALOX5 metabolizes arachidonic acid to its hydroperoxide derivative, arachidonic acid 5-hydroperoxide i.e. 5(S)-hydroperoxy-6E,8Z,11Z,14Z-eicosatetraenoic acid (5(S)-HpETE). 5(S)-HpETE may then be released and rapidly converted to 5(S)-HETE by ubiquitous cellular peroxidases:

Arachidonic acid + O_{2} → 5(S)-HpETE → 5(S)-HETE

Alternatively, 5(S)-HpETE may be further metabolized to its epoxide, 5(6)-oxido-eicosatetraenoic acid viz., leukotriene A4 (i.e. 5S,6S-epoxy-7E,9E,11Z,14Z-eicosatetraenoic acid or 5S-5,6-oxido-7E,9E,11Z,14Z-eicosatetraenoic acid). Leukotriene A4 may then be further metabolized either to leukotriene B4 by leukotriene A4 hydrolase or to leukotriene C4 by leukotriene C4 synthase. Finally, leukotriene C4 may be metabolized to leukotriene D4 and then to leukotriene E4. The relative amounts of these metabolites made by specific cells and tissues depends in large part on the relative content of the appropriate enzymes.

The selective synthesis of 5(S)-HETE (i.e. synthesis of 5(S)-HETE without concurrent synthesis of 5(R)-HETE) by cells is dependent on, and generally proportionate to, the presence and levels of its forming enzyme, ALOX5. Human ALOX5 is highly expressed in cells that regulate innate immunity responses, particularly those involved in inflammation and allergy. Examples of such cells include neutrophils, eosinophils, B lymphocytes, monocytes, macrophages, mast cells, dendritic cells, and the monocyte-derived foam cells of atherosclerosis tissues. ALOX5 is also expressed but usually at relatively low levels in many other cell types. The production of 5(S)-HETE by these cells typically serves a physiological function. However, ALOX5 can become overexpressed at high levels in certain types of human cancer cells such as those of the prostate, lung, colon, colorectal and pancreatic as a consequence of their malignant transformation. In these cells, the ALOX5-dependent production of 5(S)-HETE appears to serve a pathological function viz., it promotes the growth and spread of the cancer cells.

5(S)-HETE may also be made in combination with 5(R)-HETE along with numerous other (S,R)-hydroxy polyunsaturated fatty acids as a consequence of the non-enzymatic oxidation reactions. Formation of these products can occur in any tissue subjected to oxidative stress.

== 5(S)-HETE metabolism ==
In addition to its intrinsic activity, 5(S)-ETE can serve as an intermediate that is converted to other bioactive products. Most importantly, 5-Hydroxyeicosanoid dehydrogenase (i.e. 5-HEDH) converts the 5-hydroxy residue of 5(S)-HETE to a ketone residue to form 5-oxo-eicosatetraenoic acid (i.e. 5-oxo-6E,8Z,11Z,14Z-eicosatetraenoate, abbreviated as 5-oxo-ETE). 5-HEDH is a reversibly acting NADP^{+}/NADPH-dependent enzyme that catalyzes to following reaction:

5(S)-HETE + NADP^{+} $\rightleftharpoons$ 5-oxo-ETE + NADPH

5-HEDH acts bi-directionally: it preferentially oxygenates 5(S)-HETE to 5-oxo-ETE in the presence of excess NADH^{+} but preferentially reduces 5-oxo-ETE back to 5(S)-HETE in the presence of excess NADPH. Since cells typically maintain far higher levels of NADPH than NADP^{+}, they usually make little or no 5-oxo-ETE. When undergoing oxidative stress, however, cells contain higher levels of NADH^{+} than NADPH and make 5-oxo-ETE preferentially. Additionally, in vitro studies indicate that cells can transfer their 5(S)-HETE to cells that contain high levels of 5-NEDH and NADP^{+} and therefore convert the transferred 5(S)-HETE to 5-oxo-ETE. It is suggested that 5-oxo-ETE forms preferentially in vivo under conditions of oxidative stress or conditions where ALOX5-rich cells can transfer their 5(S)-HETE to cells epithelial, endothelial, dendritic, and certain (e.g. prostate, breast, and lung) cancer cells which display little or no ALOX5 activity but have high levels of 5-NEDH and NADP^{+}. Since 5-oxo-ETE is 30- to 100-fold more potent than 5(S)-HETE, 5-HEDH main function may be to increase the biological impact of 5-HETE production.

Cells metabolize 5-(S)-HETE in other ways. They may use:

- An acyltransferase to esterify 5(S)-HETE into their membrane phospholipids. This reaction may serve to storing 5(S)-HETE for its release during subsequent cell stimulation and/or alter the properties of cell membranes in functionally important ways.
- A cytochrome P450, probably CYP4F3, to metabolize 5(S)-HETE to 5(S),20-dihydroxy-eicosatetraenoate (5,20-diHETE). Since 5,20-diHETE is ~50- to 100-fold weaker than 5(S)-HETE in stimulating cells, this metabolism is proposed to represent a pathway for 5(S)-HETE inactivation.
- ALOX15 to metabolize 5(S)-HETE to 5(S),15(S)-dihydroxy-eicosatetraenoate (5,15-diHETE). 5,15-diHETE is ~3- to 10-fold weaker than 5(S)-HETE in stimulating cells.
- 12-Lipoxygenase (i.e. ALOX12) to metabolize 5(S)-HETE to 5(S),12(S)-diHETE. The activity of this product has not yet been fully evaluated.
- Cyclooxygenase-2 to metabolize 5(S)-HETE to 5(S),15(R)-diHETE and 5(S),11(R)-diHETE. The activity of these products have not yet been fully evaluated.
- Aspirin-treated cyclooxygenase-2 to metabolize 5(S)-HETE to 5(S),15(R)-diHETE. The activity of this product has not yet been fully evaluated.

Alternate pathways that make some of the above products include the: a) metabolism of 5(S)-HpETE to 5-oxo-ETE by cytochrome P450 (CYP) enzymes such as CYP1A1, CYP1A2, CYP1B1, and CYP2S1; b) conversion of 5-HETE to 5-oxo-ETE non-enzymatically by heme or other dehydrating agents; c) formation of 5-oxo-15(S)-hydroxy-ETE through 5-HEDH-based oxidation of 5(S),15(S)-dihydroxyicosatetraenoate; d) formation of 5(S),15(R)-dihydroxy-eicosatetraenoate by the attack of ALOX5 on 15-hydroxyicosatetraenoic acid (15(S)-HETE); e) formation of 5-oxo-15(S)-hydroxy-eicosatetreaenoate (5-oxo-15(S)-hydroxy-ETE) by the arachidonate 15-lipoxygenase-1-based or arachidonate 15-lipoxygenase-2-based metabolism of 5-oxo-ETE; and f) conversion of 5(S)-HpETE and 5(R)-HpETE to 5-oxo-ETE by the action of a mouse macrophage 50-60 kilodalton cytosolic protein.

== Mechanism of action ==
=== The OXER1 receptor ===
5(S)-HETE family members share a common receptor target for stimulating cells that differs from the receptors targeted by the other major products of ALOX5, i.e., leukotriene B4, leukotriene C4, leukotriene D4, leukotriene E4, lipoxin A4, and lipoxin B4. It and other members of the 5(S)-HETE family stimulate cells primarily by binding and thereby activating a dedicated G protein-coupled receptor, the oxoeicosanoid receptor 1 (i.e. OXER1, also termed the OXE, OXE-R, hGPCR48, HGPCR48, or R527 receptor). OXER1 couples to the G protein complex composed of the Gi alpha subunit (Gαi) and G beta-gamma complex (Gβγ); when bound to a 5-(S)-HETE family member, OXER1 triggers this G protein complex to dissociate into its Gαi and Gβγ components with Gβγ appearing to be the component responsible for activating the signal pathways which lead to cellular functional responses. The cell-activation pathways stimulated by OXER1 include those mobilizing calcium ions and activating MAPK/ERK, p38 mitogen-activated protein kinases, cytosolic phospholipase A2, PI3K/Akt, and protein kinase C beta and epsilon. The relative potencies of 5-oxo-ETE, 5-oxo-15(S)-HETE, 5(S)-HETE, 5(S),15(S)-diHETE, 5-oxo-20-hydroxy-ETE, 5(S),20-diHETE, and 5,15-dioxo-ETE in binding to, activating, and thereby stimulating cell responses through the OXER1 receptor are ~100, 30, 5–10, 1–3, 1–3, 1, and <1, respectively.

=== Other receptors ===
Progress in proving the role of the 5-HETE family of agonists and their OXER1 receptor in human physiology and disease has been made difficult because mice, rats, and the other rodents so far tested lack OXER1. Rodents are the most common in vivo models for investigating these issues. OXER1 is expressed in non-human primates, a wide range of other mammals, and various fish species and a model of allergic airways disease in cats, which express OXER1 and make 5-oxo-ETE, has recently been developed for such studies. In any event, cultured mouse MA-10 Leydig cells, while responding to 5-oxo-ETE, lack OXER1. It is suggested that this cell's, as well as mouse and other rodent, responses to 5-oxo-ETE are mediated by a receptor closely related to OXER11 viz., the mouse niacin receptor 1, Niacr1. Niacr1, an ortholog of OXER1, is a G protein-coupled receptor for niacin, and responds to 5-oxo-ETE. It has also been suggested that one or more of the mouse hydroxycarboxylic acid (HCA) family of the G protein-coupled receptors, HCA1 (GPR81), HCA2 (GPR109A), and HCA3 (GPR109B), which are G protein-coupled receptors for fatty acids may be responsible for rodent responses to 5-oxo-ETE. It is possible that human cellular responses to 5-oxo-ETE and perhaps its analogs may involve, at least in isolated instances, one or more of these receptors.

=== PPARγ ===
5-Oxo-15(S)-hydroxy-ETE and to a lesser extent 5-oxo-ETE but not 5(S)-HETE also bind to and activate peroxisome proliferator-activated receptor gamma (PPARγ). Activation of OXER1 receptor and PPARγ by the oxo analogs can have opposing effects on cells. For example, 5-oxo-ETE-bound OXER1 stimulates while 5-oxo-ETE-bound PPARγ inhibits the proliferation of various types of human cancer cell lines.

=== Other mechanisms ===
5(S)-HETE acylated into the phosphatidylethanolamines fraction of human neutrophil membranes is associated with the inhibition of these cells from forming neutrophil extracellular traps, i.e. extracellular DNA scaffolds which contain neutrophil-derived antimicrobial proteins that circulate in blood and have the ability to trap bacteria. It seems unlikely that this inhibition reflects involvement of OXER1. 5-Oxo-ETE relaxes pre-contracted human bronchi by a mechanism that does not appear to involve OXER1 but is otherwise undefined.

== Clinical significance ==
=== Inflammation ===
5(S)-HETE and other family members were first detected as products of arachidonic acid made by stimulated human polymorphonuclear neutrophils (PMN), a leukocyte blood cell type involved in host immune defense against infection but also implicated in aberrant pro-inflammatory immune responses such as arthritis; soon thereafter they found to be active also in stimulating these cells to migrate (i.e. chemotaxis), degranulate (i.e. release the anti-bacterial and tissue-injuring contents of their granules), produce bacteriocidal and tissue-injuring reactive oxygen species, and mount other pro-defensive as well as pro-inflammatory responses of the innate immune system. For example, the gram-negative bacterium, Salmonella tryphimurium, and the outer surface of gram-negative bacteria lipopolysaccharide, promote the production of 5(S)-HETE and 5-oxo-ETE by human neutrophils. The family members stimulate another blood cell of the innate immunity system, the human monocyte, acting synergistically with the pro-inflammatory CC chemokines, monocyte chemotactic protein-1 and monocyte chemotactic protein-3, to stimulate monocyte function. 5-Oxo-ETE also stimulates two other cell types that share responsibility with the PMN for regulating inflammation, the human lymphocyte and dendritic cell. And, in vivo studies, the injection of 5-oxo-ETE into the skin of human volunteers causes the local accumulation of PMN and monocyte-derived macrophages. Furthermore, the production of one or more 5(S)-HETE family members as well as the expression of orthologs of the human OXER1 receptor occur in various mammalian species including dogs, cats, cows, sheep, elephants, pandas, opossums, and ferrets and in several species of fish; for example, cats undergoing experimentally induced asthma accumulate 5-oxo-ETE in their lung lavage fluid, feline leucocytes make as well as respond to 5-oxo-ETE by an oxer1-dependent mechanism; and an OXER1 ortholog and, apparently, 5-oxo-ETE are necessary for the inflammatory response to tissue damage caused by osmolarity insult in zebrafish.

These results given above suggest that members of the 5-oxo-ETE family and the OXER1 receptor or its orthologs may contribute to protection against microbes, the repair of damaged tissues, and pathological inflammatory responses in humans and other animal species. However, an OXER1 ortholog is absent in mice and other rodents; while rodent tissues do exhibit responsiveness to 5-oxo-ETE, the lack of an oxer1 or other clear 5-oxoETE receptor in such valued animal models of diseases as rodents has impeded progress in our understanding of the physiological and pathological roles of 5-oxo-ETE.

=== Allergy ===
The following human cell types or tissues that are implicated in allergic reactivity produce 5-HETE (stereoisomer typically not defined): alveolar macrophages isolated from asthmatic and non-asthmatic patients, basophils isolated from blood and challenged with anti-IgE antibody, mast cells isolated from lung, cultured pulmonary artery endothelial cells, isolated human pulmonary vasculature, and allergen-sensitized human lung specimens challenged with specific allergen. Additionally, cultured human airway epithelial cell lines, normal bronchial epithelium, and bronchial smooth muscle cells convert 5(S)-HETE to 5-oxo-ETE in a reaction that is greatly increase by oxidative stress, which is a common component in allergic inflammatory reactions. Finally, 5-HETE is found in the bronchoalveolar lavage fluid of asthmatic humans and 5-oxo-ETE is found in the bronchoalveolar lavage fluid of cats undergoing allergen-induced bronchospasm.

Among the 5-HETE family of metabolites, 5-oxo-ETE is implicated as the most likely member to contribute to allergic reactions. It has exceptionally high potency in stimulating the chemotaxis, release of granule-bound tissue-injuring enzymes, and production of tissue-injuring reactive oxygen species of a cell type involved in allergic reactions, the human eosinophil granulocyte. It is also exceptionally potent in stimulating eosinophils to activate cytosolic phospholipase A2 (PLA2G4A) and possibly thereby to form platelet-activating factor (PAF) as well as metabolites of the 5-HETE family. PAF is itself a proposed mediator of human allergic reactions which commonly forms concurrently with 5-HETE family metabolites in human leukocytes and acts synergistically with these metabolites, particularly 5-oxo-ETE, to stimulate eosinophils. 5-Oxo-ETE also cooperates positively with at least four other potential contributors to allergic reactions, RANTES, eotaxin, granulocyte macrophage colony-stimulating factor, and granulocyte colony-stimulating factor in stimulating human eosinophils and is a powerful stimulator of chemotaxis in another cell type contributing to allergic reactions, the human basophil granulocyte. Finally, 5-oxo-ETE stimulates the infiltration of eosinophils into the skin of humans following its intradermal injection (its actions are more pronounced in asthmatic compared to healthy subjects) and when instilled into the trachea of Brown Norway rats causes eosinophils to infiltrate lung. These results suggest that the 5-oxo-ETE made at the initial tissue site of allergen insult acting through the OXER1 on target cells attracts circulating eosinophils and basophils to lung, nasal passages, skin, and possibly other sites of allergen deposition to contribute to asthma, rhinitis, and dermatitis, and other sites of allergic reactivity.

The role of 5-HETE family agonists in the bronchoconstriction of airways (a hallmark of allergen-induced asthma) in humans is currently unclear. 5-HETE stimulates the contraction of isolated human bronchial muscle, enhances the ability of histamine to contract this muscle, and contracts guinea pig lung strips. 5-Oxo-ETE also stimulates contractile responses in fresh bronchi, cultured bronchi, and cultured lung smooth muscle taken from guinea pigs but in direct contrast to these studies is reported to relax bronchi isolated from humans. The latter bronchi contractile responses were blocked by cyclooxygenase-2 inhibition or a thromboxane A2 receptor antagonist and therefore appear mediated by 5-oxo-ETE-induced production of this thromboxane. In all events, the relaxing action of 5-oxo-ETE on human bronchi does not appear to involve OXER1.

=== Cancer ===
The 5-oxo-ETE family of agonists have also been proposed to contribute to the growth of several types of human cancers. This is based on their ability to stimulate certain cultured human cancer cell lines to proliferate, the presence of OXER1 mRNA and/or protein in these cell lines, the production of 5-oxo-ETE family members by these cell lines, the induction of cell death (i.e. apoptosis) by inhibiting 5-lipoxygenase in these cells, and/or the overexpression of 5-lipoxygenase in tissue taken from the human tumors. Human cancers whose growth has been implicated by these studies as being mediated at least in part by a member(s) of the 5-oxo-ETE family include those of the prostate, breast, lung, ovary, and pancreas.

=== Steroid production ===
5(S)-HETE and 5(S)-HpETE stimulate the production of progesterone by cultured rat ovarian glomerulosa cells and enhance the secretion of progesterone and testosterone by cultured rat testicular Leydig cells. Both metabolites are made by cyclic adenosine monophosphate-stimulated MA-10 mouse Leydig cells; stimulate these cells to transcribe steroidogenic acute regulatory protein, and in consequence produce the steroids. The results suggest that trophic hormones (e.g., leutenizing hormone, adrenocorticotropic hormone) stimulate these steroid producing cells to make 5(S)-HETE and 5(S)-HpEPE which in turn increase the synthesis of steroidogenic acute regulatory protein; the latter protein promotes the rate-limiting step in steroidogenesis, transfer of cholesterol from the outer to the inner membrane of mitochondria and thereby acts in conjunction with trophic hormone-induce activation of protein kinase A to make progesterone and testosterone. This pathway may also operate in humans: Human H295R adrenocortical cells do express OXER1 and respond to 5-oxo-ETE by an increasing the transcription of steroidogenic acute regulatory protein messenger RNA as well as the production of aldosterone and progesterone by an apparent OXER1-dependent pathway.

Rat and mouse cells lack OXER1. It has been suggested that the cited mouse MA-10 cell responses to 5-oxo-ETE are mediated by an ortholog to OXER1, mouse niacin receptor 1, Niacr1, which is a G protein-coupled receptor mediating the activity of niacin, or by one or more of the mouse hydroxycarboxylic acid (HCA) family of the G protein-coupled receptors, HCA1 (GPR81), HCA2 (GPR109A), and HCA3 (GPR109B), which are G protein-coupled receptors for fatty acids. In any event, Human H295R adrenocortical cells do express OXER1 and respond to 5-oxo-ETE by an increasing the transcription of steroidogenic acute regulatory protein messenger RNA as well as the production of aldosterone and progesterone by an apparent OXER1-dependent pathway.

=== Bone remodeling ===
In an in vitro mixed culture system, 5(S)-HETE is released by monocytes to stimulate, at sub-nanomolar concentrations, osteoclast-dependent bone reabsorption. It also inhibits morphogenetic protein-2 (BMP-2)-induced bone-like nodule formation in mouse calvarial organ cultures. These results allow that 5(S)-HETE and perhaps more potently, 5-oxo-ETE contribute to the regulation of bone remodeling.

=== Parturition ===
5(S)-HETE is: elevated in the human uterus during labor; at 3–150 nM, increases both the rates of spontaneous contractions and overall contractility of myometrial strips obtained at term but prior to labor from human lower uterine segments; and in an in vitro system crosses either amnion or intact amnion-chorion-decidua and thereby may along with prostaglandin E2 move from the amnion to uterus during labor in humans. These studies allow that 5(S)-HETE, perhaps in cooperation with established role of prostaglandin E2, may play a role in the onset of human labor.

=== Other actions ===
5(S)-HETE is reported to modulate tubuloglomerular feedback. 5(S)-HpETE is also reported to inhibit the Na^{+}/K^{+}-ATPase activity of synaptosome membrane preparations prepared from rat cerebral cortex and may thereby inhibit synapse-dependent communications between neurons.

5(S)-HETE acylated into phosphatidylethanolamine is reported to increase the stimulated production of superoxide anion and interleukin-8 release by isolated human neutrophils and to inhibit the formation of neutrophil extracellular traps (i.e. NETS); NETS trap blood-circulating bacteria to assist in their neutralization. 5(S)-HETE esterified to phosphatidylcholine and glycerol esters by human endothelial cells is reported to be associated with the inhibition of prostaglandin production.

== See also ==
- Arachidonic acid
- 5-Lipoxygenase
- 5-Oxo-eicosatetraenoic acid
- Leukotriene B4
- Polyunsaturated fat
- 12-Hydroxyeicosatetraenoic acid
- 15-Hydroxyeicosatetraenoic acid
