= C25H40N2O6S =

The molecular formula C_{25}H_{40}N_{2}O_{6}S (molar mass: 496.66 g/mol) may refer to:

- Eoxin D4, or 14,15-leukotriene D4
- Leukotriene D4
