= Arachidonate 5-lipoxygenase =

Class of enzymes

ALOX5

Identifiers
- Aliases: ALOX5, Alox5, 5-LO, 5-LOX, 5LO, 5LX, AI850497, F730011J02, 5LPG, LOG5, arachidonate 5-lipoxygenase
- External IDs: OMIM: 152390; MGI: 87999; GeneCards: ALOX5
Available structures
PDB	Ortholog search: PDBe RCSB
PDB	List of PDB id codes 3O8Y, 3V92, 3V98, 3V99
Enzyme activity
EC #	BRENDA	ExPASy	KEGG	MetaCyc
1.13.11.34	↗	↗	↗	↗

Gene location (Human)
Chr.	Chromosome 10 (human)
Band	10q11.21	Start	45,374,176 bp
Band	10q11.21	End	45,446,119 bp

Gene location (Mouse)
Chr.	Chromosome 6 (mouse)
Band	6 E3|6 53.79 cM	Start	116,387,038 bp
Band	6 E3|6 53.79 cM	End	116,438,139 bp

RNA expression pattern
Bgee	Human / Mouse (ortholog); Top expressed in: blood; granulocyte; right lung; monocyte; spleen; upper lobe of left lung; appendix; bone marrow; gallbladder; bone marrow cell / Top expressed in: granulocyte; decidua; bone marrow; blood; myocardium of ventricle; autopod region; embryo; skin of external ear; foot; epithelium of stomach; More reference expression data
BioGPS	More reference expression data
Gene ontology
Molecular function	iron ion binding; arachidonate 5-lipoxygenase activity; dioxygenase activity; metal ion binding; protein binding; oxidoreductase activity; oxidoreductase activity, acting on single donors with incorporation of molecular oxygen, incorporation of two atoms of oxygen
Cellular component	cytoplasm; cytosol; nuclear membrane; membrane; nuclear matrix; nuclear envelope lumen; nucleus; extracellular region; extracellular space; nuclear envelope; nucleoplasm; secretory granule lumen; ficolin-1-rich granule lumen
Biological process	leukotriene metabolic process; leukotriene production involved in inflammatory response; leukotriene biosynthetic process; inflammatory response; lipoxin metabolic process; lipoxygenase pathway; neutrophil degranulation; cytokine-mediated signaling pathway; interleukin-18-mediated signaling pathway; long-chain fatty acid biosynthetic process; lipoxin biosynthetic process
Sources:Amigo / QuickGO
Orthologs
Databases	NCBI: entry; OMA: entry
Species	Human	Mouse
Entrez	240	11689
Ensembl	ENSG00000275565; ENSG00000012779	ENSMUSG00000025701
UniProt	P09917	P48999
RefSeq (mRNA)	NM_000698; NM_001256153; NM_001256154; NM_001320861; NM_001320862	NM_009662
RefSeq (protein)	NP_000689; NP_001243082; NP_001243083; NP_001307790; NP_001307791	NP_033792
Location (UCSC)	Chr 10: 45.37 – 45.45 Mb	Chr 6: 116.39 – 116.44 Mb
PubMed search
- Wikidata
View/Edit Human	View/Edit Mouse

arachidonate 5-lipoxygenase

Identifiers
- EC no.: 1.13.11.34
- CAS no.: 80619-02-9

Databases
- BRENDA: enzyme data
- ExPASy: NiceZyme view
- KEGG: enzyme entry
- MetaCyc: metabolic pathway
- Rhea: reactions
- PDB structures: RCSB PDB PDBe PDBsum
- Gene Ontology: AmiGO / QuickGO
Search
- PMC: articles
- PubMed: articles
- NCBI: proteins

Arachidonate 5-lipoxygenase, also known as ALOX5, 5-lipoxygenase, 5-LOX, or 5-LO, is a non-heme iron-containing enzyme (EC 1.13.11.34) that in humans is encoded by the ALOX5 gene. Arachidonate 5-lipoxygenase is a member of the lipoxygenase family of enzymes. It transforms essential fatty acids (EFA) substrates into leukotrienes as well as a wide range of other biologically active products. ALOX5 is a current target for pharmaceutical intervention in a number of diseases.

== Gene ==
The ALOX5 gene, which occupies 71.9 kilobase pairs (kb) on chromosome 10 (all other human lipoxygenases are clustered together on chromosome 17), is composed of 14 exons divided by 13 introns encoding the mature 78 kilodalton (kDa) ALOX5 protein consisting of 673 amino acids. The gene promoter region of ALOX5 contains 8 GC boxes but lacks TATA boxes or CAT boxes and thus resembles the gene promoters of typical housekeeping genes. Five of the 8 GC boxes are arranged in tandem and are recognized by the transcription factors Sp1 and Egr-1. A novel Sp1-binding site occurs close to the major transcription start site (position – 65); a GC-rich core region including the Sp1/Egr-1 sites may be critical for basal 5-LO promoter activity.

== Expression ==
Cells primarily involved in regulating inflammation, allergy, and other immune responses, e.g. neutrophils, eosinophils, basophils, monocytes, macrophages, mast cells, dendritic cells, and B-lymphocytes express ALOX5. Platelets, T cells, and erythrocytes are ALOX5-negative. In skin, Langerhans cells strongly express ALOX5. Fibroblasts, smooth muscle cells and endothelial cells express low levels of ALOX5. Up-regulation of ALOX5 may occur during the maturation of leukocytes and in human neutrophils treated with granulocyte macrophage colony-stimulating factor and then stimulated with physiological agents.

Aberrant expression of LOX5 is seen in various types of human cancer tumors in vivo as well as in various types of human cancer cell lines in vitro; these tumors and cell lines include those of the pancreas, prostate and colon. ALOX5 products, particularly 5-hydroxyeicosatetraenoic acid and 5-oxo-eicosatetraenoic acid, promote the proliferation of these ALOX5 aberrantly expressing tumor cell lines suggesting that ALOX5 acts as a pro-malignancy factor for them and by extension their parent tumors.

Studies with cultured human cells have found that there are a large number of ALOX5 mRNA splice variants due to alternative splicing. The physiological and/or pathological consequences of this slicing has yet to be defined. In one study, however, human brain tumors were shown to express three mRNA splice variants (2.7, 3.1, and 6.4 kb) in addition to the full 8.6 lb species; the abundance of the variants correlated with the malignancy of these tumors suggesting that they may play a role in the development of these tumors.

== Biochemistry ==
Human ALOX5 is a soluble, monomeric protein consisting of 673 amino acids with a molecular weight of ~78 kDa. Structurally, ALOX5 possesses:

- A C-terminal catalytic domain (residues 126–673)
- An N-terminal C2-like domain which promotes its binding to ligand substrates, Ca^{2+}, cellular phospholipid membranes, Coactin-like protein (COL1), and Dicer protein
- A PLAT domain within its C2-like domain; this domain, by analogy to other PLAT domain-bearing proteins, may serve as a mobile lid over ALOX5's substrate-binding site
- An adenosine triphosphate (ATP) binding site; ATP is crucial for ALOX5's metabolic activity
- A proline-rich region (residues 566–577), sometimes termed a SH3-binding domain, which promotes its binding to proteins with SH3 domains such as Grb2 and may thereby link the enzyme's regulation to tyrosine kinase receptors.

The enzyme possesses two catalytic activities as illustrated by its metabolism of arachidonic acid. ALOX5's dioxygenase activity adds a hydroperoxyl (i.e. HO_{2}) residue to arachidonic acid (i.e. 5Z,8Z,11Z,14Z-eicosatetraenoic acid) at carbon 5 of its 1,4 diene group (i.e. its 5Z,8Z double bonds) to form 5(S)-hydroperoxy-6E,8Z,11Z,14Z-eicosatetraenoic acid (i.e. 5S-HpETE). The 5S-HpETE intermediate may then be released by the enzyme and rapidly reduced by cellular glutathione peroxidases to its corresponding alcohol, 5(S)-hydroxy-6E,8Z,11Z,14Z-eicosatetraenoic acid (i.e. 5-HETE), or, alternatively, further metabolized by ALOX5's epoxidase (also termed LTA4 synthase) activity which converts 5S-HpETE to its epoxide, 5S,6S-hydroxy-6E,8Z,11Z,14Z-eicosatetraenoic acid (i.e. LTA4). LTA4 is then acted on by a separate, soluble enzyme, leukotriene-A4 hydrolase, to form the dihydroxyl product, leukotriene B4 (LTB4, i.e. 5S,12R-dihydroxy-5S,6Z,8E,10E,12R,14Z-eicosatetraenoic acid) or by either LTC4 synthase or microsomal glutathione S-transferase 2 (MGST2), which bind the sulfur of cysteine's thio (i.e. SH) residue in the tripeptide glutamate-cysteine-glycine to carbon 6 of LTA4 thereby forming LTC4 (i.e. 5S-hydroxy,6R-(S-glutathionyl)-7E,9E,11Z,14Z-eicosatetraenoic acid). The Glu and Gly residues of LTC4 may be removed step-wise by gamma-glutamyltransferase and a dipeptidase to form sequentially LTD4 and LTE4. To varying extents, the other PUFA substrates of ALOX5 follow similar metabolic pathways to form analogous products.

Sub-human mammalian Alox5 enzymes like those in rodents appear to have, at least in general, similar structures, distributions, activities, and functions as human ALOX5. Hence, model Alox5 studies in rodents appear to be valuable for defining the function of ALOX5 in humans (see Lipoxygenase § Mouse lipoxygenases).

== Regulation ==
ALOX5 exists primarily in the cytoplasm and nucleoplasm of cells. Upon cell stimulation, ALOX5: a) may be phosphorylated on serine 663, 523, and/or 271 by mitogen-activated protein kinases, S6 kinase, protein kinase A (PKA), protein kinase C, Cdc2, and/or a Ca^{2+}/calmodulin-dependent protein kinase; b) moves to bind with phospholipids in the nuclear membrane and, probably, endoplasmic reticulum membrane; c) is able to accept substrate fatty acids presented to it by the 5-lipoxygenase-activating protein (FLAP) which is embedded in these membranes; and d) thereby becomes suited for high metabolic activity. These events, along with rises in cytosolic Ca^{2+} levels, which promote the translocation of ALOX5 form the cytoplasm and nucleoplasm to the cited membranes, are induced by cell stimulation such as that caused by chemotactic factors on leukocytes. Rises in cytosolic Ca^{2+}, ALOX5's movement to membranes, and ALOX5's interaction with FLAP are critical to the physiological activation of the enzyme. Serine 271 and 663 phosphorylations do not appear to alter ALOX5's activity. Serine 523 phosphorylation (which is conducted by PKA) totally inactivates the enzyme and prevents its nuclear localization; stimuli which cause cells to activate PKA can thereby block production of ALOX5 metabolites.

In addition to its activation, ALOX5 must gain access to its polyunsaturated fatty acid (PUFA) substrates, which commonly are bound in an ester linkage to the sn2 position of membrane phospholipids, in order to form biologically active products. This is accomplished by a large family of phospholipase A2 (PLA_{2}) enzymes. The cytosolic PLA_{2} set (i.e. cPLA_{2}s) of PLA_{2} enzymes (see Phospholipase A2 § Cytosolic phospholipases A2 (cPLA2)) in particular mediates many instances of stimulus-induced release of PUFA in inflammatory cells. For example, chemotactic factors stimulate human neutrophils to raise cytosolic Ca^{2+} which triggers cPLA_{2}s, particularly the α isoform (cPLA_{2}α), to move from its normal residence in the cytosol to cellular membranes. This chemotactic factor stimulation concurrently causes the activation of mitogen-activated protein kinases (MAPK) which in turn stimulates the activity of cPLA_{2}α by phosphorylating it on ser-505 (other cell types may activate this or other cPLA_{2} isoforms using other kinases which phosphorylate them on different serine residues). These two events allow cPLA_{2}s to release PUFA esterified to membrane phospholipids to FLAP which then presents them to ALOX5 for their metabolism.

Other factors are known to regulate ALOX5 activity in vitro but have not been fully integrated into its physiological activation during cell stimulation. ALOX5 binds with the F actin-binding protein, coactin-like protein. Based on in vitro studies, this protein binding serves to stabilize ALOX5 by acting as a chaperone (protein) or scaffold, thereby averting the enzyme's inactivation to promote its metabolic activity; depending on circumstance such as the presence of phospholipids and levels of ambient Ca^{2+}, this binding also alters the relative levels of hydroperoxy versus epoxide (see arachidonic acid section below) products made by ALOX5. The binding of ALOX5 to membranes as well as its interaction with FLAP likewise cause the enzyme to alter its relative levels of hydroperoxy versus epoxide production, in these cases favoring the production of the epoxide products. The presence of certain diacylglycerols such as 1-oleoyl-2-acetyl-sn-glycerol, 1-hexadecyl-2-acetyl-sn-glycerol, and 1-O-hexadecyl-2-acetyl-sn-glycerol, and 1,2-dioctanoyl-sn-glycerol but not 1-stearoyl-2-arachidonyl-sn-glycerol increase the catalytic activity of ALOX5 in vitro.

== Substrates, metabolites, and metabolite activities ==
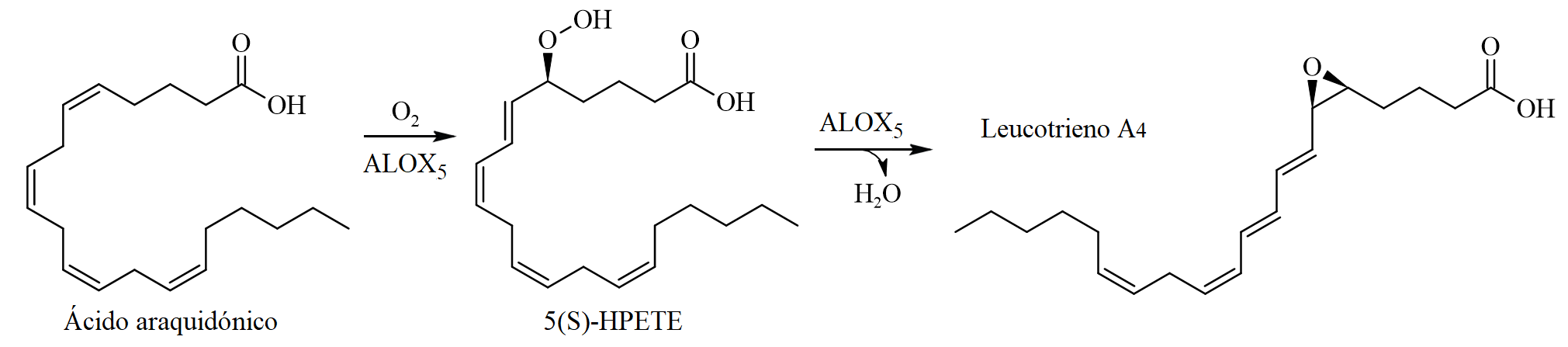
ALOX5 metabolizes various omega-3 and omega-6 PUFA to a wide range of products with varying and sometimes opposing biological activities. A list of these substrates along with their principal metabolites and metabolite activities follows.

=== Arachidonic acid ===
ALOX5 metabolizes the omega-6 fatty acid, arachidonic acid (AA, i.e. 5Z,8Z,11Z,14Z-eicosatetraenoic acid), to 5-hydroperoxyeicosatetraenoic acid (5-HpETE) which is then rapidly converted to physiologically and pathologically important products. Ubiquitous cellular glutathione peroxidases (GPXs) reduce 5-HpETE to 5-hydroxyeicosatetraenoic acid (5-HETE); 5-HETE may be further metabolized by 5-hydroxyeicosanoid dehydrogenase (5-HEDH) to 5-oxo-eicosatetraenoic acid (5-oxo-ETE). Alternatively, the intrinsic activity of ALOX5 may convert 5-HpETE to its 5,6 epoxide, leukotriene A4 LTA4, which is then either rapidly converted to leukotriene B4 (LTB4) by leukotriene-A4 hydrolase (LTA4H) or to leukotriene C4 (LTC4) by LTC4 synthase (LTC4S); LTC4 exits its cells of origin through the MRP1 transporter (ABCC1) and is rapidly converted to LTD4 and then to LTE4) by cell surface-attached gamma-glutamyltransferase and dipeptidase peptidase enzymes. In another pathway, ALOX5 may act in series with a second lipoxygenase enzyme, ALOX15, to metabolize AA to lipoxin A4 (LxA4) and LxB4 (see Specialized pro-resolving mediators § Lipoxins). GPXs, 5-HEDH, LTA4H, LTC4S, ABCC1, and cell surface peptidases may act similarly on the ALOX5-derived metabolites of other PUFA.

LTB4, 5-HETE, and 5-oxo-ETE may contribute to the innate immune response as leukocyte chemotactic factors, i.e. they recruit and further activate circulating blood neutrophils and monocytes to sites of microbial invasion, tissue injury, and foreign bodies. When produced in excess, however, they may contribute to a wide range of pathological inflammatory responses (5-HETE and LTB4). 5-Oxo-ETE is a particularly potent chemotactic factor for and activator of eosinophils and may thereby contribute to eosinophil-based allergic reactions and diseases. These metabolites may also contribute to the progression of certain cancers such as those of the prostate, breast, lung, ovary, and pancreas. ALOX5 may be overexpressed in some of these cancers; 5-Oxo-ETE and to a lesser extent 5-HETE stimulate human cell lines derived from these cancers to proliferate; and the pharmacological inhibition of ALOX5 in these human cell lines causes them to die by entering apoptosis. ALOX5 and its LTB4 metabolite as well as this metabolite's BLT1 and BLT2 receptors have also been shown to promote the growth of various types of human cancer cell lines in culture.

LTC4, LTD4, and LTE4 contribute to allergic airways reactions such as asthma, certain non-allergic hypersensitivity airways reactions, and other lung diseases involving bronchoconstriction by contracting these airways and promoting in these airways inflammation, micro-vascular permeability, and mucus secretion; they likewise contribute to various allergic and non-allergic reactions involving rhinitis, conjunctivitis, and urticaria. Certain of these peptide-leukotrienes have been shown to promote the growth of cultured human breast cancer and chronic lymphocytic leukemia cell lines thereby suggesting that ALOX5 may contribute to the progression of these diseases.

LxA4 and LxB4 are members of the specialized pro-resolving mediators class of polyunsaturated fatty acid metabolites. They form later than the ALOX5-derived chemotactic factors in the inflammatory response and are thought to limit or resolve these responses by, for example, inhibiting the entry of circulating leukocytes into inflamed tissues, inhibiting the pro-inflammatory action of the leukocytes, promoting leukocytes to exit from inflammatory sites, and stimulating leukocyte apoptosis (see Specialized pro-resolving mediators and Lipoxin).

=== Mead acid ===
Mead acid (i.e. 5Z,8Z,11Z-eicosatrienoic acid) is identical to AA except that has a single rather than double bond between its 14 and 15 carbon. ALOX5 metabolizes mead acid to 3-series (i.e. containing 3 double bonds) analogs of its 4-series AA metabolites viz., 5(S)-hydroxy-6E,8Z,11Z-eicosatrienoic acid (5-HETrE), 5-oxo-6,8,11-eicosatrienoic acid (5-oxo-ETrE), LTA3, and LTC3; since LTA3 inhibits LTA hydrolase, mead acid metabolizing cells produce relatively little LTB3 and are blocked from metabolizing arachidonic acid to LTB4. On the other hand, 5-oxo-ETrE is almost as potent as 5-oxo-ETE as an eosinophil chemotactic factor and may thereby contribute to the development of physiological and pathological allergic responses. Presumably, the same metabolic pathways that follow ALOX5 in metabolizing arachidonic acid to the 4-series metabolites likewise act on mead acid to form these products.

=== Eicosapentaenoic acid ===
ALOX5 metabolizes the omega-3 fatty acid, eicosapentaenoic acid (EPA, i.e. 4Z,8Z,11Z,14Z,17Z-eiosapentaenoic acid), to 5-hydroperoxy-eicosapentaenoic acid which is then converted to 5-series products that are structurally analogous to their arachidonic acid counterparts viz., 5-hydroxy-eicosapentaenoic acid (5-HEPE), 5-oxo-eiocosapentaenoic acid (5-oxo-HEPE), LTB5, LTC5, LTD5, and LTE5. Presumably, the same metabolic pathways that follow ALOX5 in metabolizing arachidonic acid to the 4-series metabolites likewise act on EPA to form these 5-series products. ALOX5 also cooperates with other lipoxygenase, cyclooxygenase, or cytochrome P450 enzymes in serial metabolic pathways to metabolize EPA to resolvins of the E series (see Specialized pro-resolving mediators § EPA-derived resolvins for further details on this metabolism) viz., resolvin E1 (RvE1) and RvE2.

5-HEPE, 5-oxo-HEPE, LTB5, LTC5, LTD5, and LTE5 are generally less potent in stimulating cells and tissues than their arachidonic acid-derived counterparts; since their production is associated with reduced production of their arachidonic acid-derived counterparts, they may indirectly serve to reduce the pro-inflammatory and pro-allergic activities of their arachidonic acid-derived counterparts. RvE1 and ReV2 are specialized pro-resolving mediators that contribute to the resolution of inflammation and other reactions.

=== Docosahexaenoic acid ===
ALOX5 acts in series with ALOX15 to metabolize the omega 3 fatty acid, docosahexaenoic acid (DHA, i.e. 4Z,7Z,10Z,13Z,16Z,19Z-docosahexaenoic acid), to D series resolvins (see Specialized pro-resolving mediators § DHA-derived resolvins for further details on this metabolism).

The D series resolvins (i.e. RvD1, RvD2, RvD3, RvD4, RvD5, RvD6, AT-RVD1, AT-RVD2, AT-RVD3, AT-RVD4, AT-RVD5, and AT-RVD6) are specialized pro-resolving mediators that contribute to the resolution of inflammation, promote tissue healing, and reduce the perception of inflammation-based pain.

== Transgenic studies ==
Studies in model animal systems that delete or overexpress the Alox5 gene have given seemingly paradoxical results. In mice, for example, Alox5 overexpression may decrease the damage caused by some types yet increase the damage caused by other types of invasive pathogens. This may be a reflection of the array of metabolites made by the Alox5 enzyme some of which possess opposing activities like the pro-inflammatory chemotactic factors and the anti-inflammatory specialized pro-resolving mediators. Alox5 and presumably human ALOX5 functions may vary widely depending on: the agents stimulating their activity; the types of metabolites that they form; the specific tissues responding to these metabolites; the times (e.g. early versus delayed) at which observations are made; and very likely various other factors.

Alox5 gene knockout mice are more susceptible to the development and pathological complications of experimental infection with Klebsiella pneumoniae, Borrelia burgdorferi, and Paracoccidioides brasiliensis. In a model of cecum perforation-induced sepsis, ALOX5 gene knockout mice exhibited a decrease in the number of neutrophils and an increase in the number of bacteria that accumulated in their peritoneum. On the other hand, ALOX5 gene knockout mice demonstrate an enhanced resistance and lessened pathology to Brucella abortus infection and, at least in its acute phase, Trypanosoma cruzi infection. Furthermore, Alox5-null mice exhibit a worsened inflammatory component, failure to resolve inflammation-related responses, and decreased survival in experimental models of respiratory syncytial virus disease, Lyme disease, Toxoplasma gondii disease, and corneal injury. These studies indicate that Alox5 can serve a protective function presumably by generating metabolites such as chemotactic factors that mobilize the innate immunity system. However, the suppression of inflammation appears also to be a function of Alox5, presumably by contributing to the production of anti-inflammatory specialized pro-resolving mediators (SPMs), at least in certain rodent inflammation-based model systems. These genetic studies allow that ALOX5 along with the chemotactic factors and SPMs that they contribute to making may play similar opposing pro-inflammatory and anti-inflammatory functions in humans.

Alox5 gene knockout mice exhibit an increase in the lung tumor volume and liver metastasis of Lewis lung carcinoma cells that were directly implanted into their lungs; this result differs from many in vitro studies which implicated human ALOX5 along with certain of its metabolites with promoting cancer cell growth in that it finds that mouse Alox5 and, perhaps, certain of its metabolites inhibit cancer cell growth. Studies in this model suggest that Alox5, acting through one or more of its metabolites, reduces growth and progression of the Lewis carcinoma by recruiting cancer-inhibiting CD4+ T helper cells and CD8+ T cytotoxic T cells to the sites of implantation. This striking difference between human in vitro and mouse in vivo studies may reflect species differences, in vitro versus in vivo differences, or cancer cell type differences in the function of ALOX5/Alox5.

== Clinical significance ==
=== Inflammation ===
Studies implicate ALOX5 in contributing to innate immunity by contributing to the mounting inflammatory responses to a wide range of diseases:

- acute pathogen invasion, trauma, and burns (see Inflammation § Causes)

however, ALOX5 also contributes to the development and progression of excessive and chronic inflammatory responses such as:

- rheumatoid arthritis
- atherosclerosis
- inflammatory bowel disease
- autoimmune diseases

(see Inflammation § Disorders).

These dual functions probably reflect ALOX5's ability to form the: a) potent chemotactic factor, LTB4, and possibly also weaker chemotactic factor, 5S-HETE, which serve to attract and otherwise activate inflammation-inducing cells such as circulating leukocytes and tissue macrophages and dendritic cells and b) lipoxin and resolvin subfamily of SPMs which tend to inhibit these cells as well as the overall inflammatory responses.

=== Allergy ===
ALOX5 contributes to the development and progression of allergy and allergic inflammation reactions and diseases such as:

- allergic rhinitis
- conjunctivitis
- asthma
- rashes
- eczema (see Allergy § Signs and symptoms).

This activity reflects its formation of a) LTC4, LTD4, and LTE4 which promote vascular permeability, contract airways smooth muscle, and otherwise perturb these tissues and b) LTB4 and possibly 5-oxo-ETE which are chemotactic factors for, and activators of, the cell type promoting such reactions, the eosinophil. 5-Oxo-ETE and, to a lesser extent, 5S-HETE, also act synergistically with another pro-allergic mediator, platelet-activating factor, to stimulate and otherwise activate eosinophils.

=== Hypersensitivity reactions ===
ALOX5 contributes to non-allergic NSAID hypersensitivity reactions of the respiratory system and skin such as:

- aspirin-exacerbated respiratory disease
- nonallergic rhinitis
- non-allergic conjunctivitis
- angioedema
- urticarial.

It may also contribute to hypersensitivity responses of the respiratory system to cold air and possibly even alcohol beverages. These pathological responses likely involve the same ALOX5-formed metabolites as those promoting allergic reactions.

=== ALOX5-inhibiting drugs ===
The tissue, animal model, and animal and human genetic studies cited above implicate ALOX5 in a wide range of diseases:

- excessive inflammatory responses to pathogens, trauma, burns, and other forms of tissue injury (see Inflammation § Causes)
- chronic inflammatory conditions such as:
  - rheumatoid arthritis
  - atherosclerosis
  - inflammatory bowel disease
  - autoimmune diseases
  - Alzheimer's disease

(see Inflammation § Disorders)

- allergy and allergic inflammation reactions such as:
  - allergic rhinitis
  - conjunctivitis
  - asthma
  - rashes
  - eczema
- NSAID-induced acute non-allergic reactions such as:
  - asthma
  - rhinitis
  - conjunctivitis
  - angioedema
  - urticaria
- the progression of certain cancers such as those of the prostate and pancreas.

However, clinical use of drugs that inhibit ALOX5 to treat any of these diseases has been successful with only Zileuton along with its controlled released preparation, Zileuton CR.

Zileuton is approved in the US for the prophylaxis and chronic treatment of allergic asthma; it is also used to treat chronic non-allergic reactions such as NSAID-induced non-allergic lung, nose, and conjunctiva reactions as well as exercise-induced asthma. Zileuton has shown some beneficial effects in clinical trials for the treatment of rheumatoid arthritis, inflammatory bowel disease, and psoriasis. Zileuton is currently undergoing a phase II study for the treatment of acne vulgaris (mild-to-moderate inflammatory facial acne) and a phase I study (see Clinical trial § Phases) combining it with imatinib for treating chronic myeloid leukemia. Zyleuton and zileuton CR cause elevations in liver enzymes in 2% of patients; the two drugs are therefore contraindicated in patients with active liver disease or persistent hepatic enzyme elevations greater than three times the upper limit of normal. Hepatic function should be assessed prior to initiating either of these drugs, monthly for the first 3 months, every 2–3 months for the remainder of the first year, and periodically thereafter; zileuton also has a rather unfavorable pharmacological profile (see Zileuton § Contraindications and warnings). Given these deficiencies, other drugs targeting ALOX5 are under study.

Flavocoxid is a proprietary blend of purified plant derived bioflavonoids including Baicalin and Catechins. It inhibits COX-1, COX-2, and ALOX5 in vitro and in animal models. Flavocoxid has been approved for use as a medical food in the United States since 2004 and is available by prescription for use in chronic osteoarthritis in tablets of 500 mg under the commercial name Limbrel. However, in clinical trials serum liver enzyme elevations occurred in up to 10% of patients on flavocoxid therapy although elevations above 3 times the upper limit of normal occurred in only 1-2% of recipients. Since its release, however, there have been several reports of clinically apparent acute liver injury attributed to flavocoxid.

Setileuton (MK-0633) has completed a Phase II clinical trial for the treatment of asthma, chronic obstructive lung disease, and atherosclerosis (NCT00404313, NCT00418613, and NCT00421278, respectively). PF-4191834 has completed phase II studies for the treatment of asthma (NCT00723021).

Hyperforin, an active constituent of the herb St John's wort, is active at micromolar concentrations in inhibiting ALOX5. Indirubin-3'-monoxime, a derivative of the naturally occurring alkaloid, indirubin, is also described as selective ALOX5 inhibitor effective in a range of cell-free and cell-based model systems. In addition, curcumin, a constituent of turmeric, is a 5-LO inhibitor as defined by in vitro studies of the enzyme.

Acetyl-keto-beta-boswellic acid (AKBA), one of the bioactive boswellic acids found in Boswellia serrata (Indian Frankincense) has been found to inhibit 5-lipoxygenase. Boswellia reduces brain edema in patients irradiated for brain tumor and it's believed to be due to 5-lipoxygenase inhibition.

While only one ALOX5-inhibiting drug has proven useful for treating human diseases, other drugs that act down-stream in the ALOX5-initiated pathway are in clinical use. Montelukast, Zafirlukast, and Pranlukast are receptor antagonists for the cysteinyl leukotriene receptor 1 which contributes to mediating the actions of LTC4, LTD4, and LTE4. These drugs are in common use as prophylaxis and chronic treatment of allergic and non-allergic asthma and rhinitis diseases and also may be useful for treating acquired childhood sleep apnea due to adenotonsillar hypertrophy (see Acquired non-inflammatory myopathy § Diet and Trauma Induced Myopathy).

To date, however, neither LTB4 synthesis inhibitors (i.e. blockers of ALOX5 or LTA4 hydrolase) nor inhibitors of LTB4 receptors (BLT1 and BLT2) have turned out to be effective anti-inflammatory drugs. Furthermore, blockers of LTC4, LTD4, and LTE4 synthesis (i.e. ALOX5 inhibitors) as well as of LTC4 and LTD4 receptor antagonists have proven inferior to corticosteroids as single drug therapy for persistent asthma, particularly in patients with airway obstruction. As a second drug added to corticosteroids, leukotriene inhibitors appear inferior to beta2-adrenergic agonist drugs in the treatment of asthma.

== Human genetics ==
ALOX5 contributes to the formation of PUFA metabolites that may promote (e.g. the leukotrienes, 5-oxo-ETE) but also to metabolites that inhibit (i.e. lipoxins, resolvins) diseases. Consequently, a given abnormality in the expression or activity of ALOX5 due to variations in its gene may promote or suppress inflammation depending on the relative roles these opposing metabolites have in regulating the particular type of reaction examined. Furthermore, the ALOX5-related tissue reactions studied to date are influenced by multiple genetic, environmental, and developmental variables that may influence the consequences of abnormalities in the expression or function of ALOX5. Consequently, abnormalities in the ALOX5 gene may vary with the population and individuals studied.

=== Allergic asthma ===
The upstream promoter in the human ALOX5 gene commonly possess five GGGCCGG repeats which bind the Sp1 transcription factor and thereby increase the gene's transcription of ALOX5. Homozygous variants for this five repeat promoter region in a study of 624 asthmatic children in Ankara, Turkey were much more likely to have severe asthma. These variants are associated with reduced levels of ALOX5 as well as reduced production of LTC4 in their eosinophils. These data suggest that ALOX5 may contribute to dampening the severity of asthma, possibly by metabolizing PUFA to specialized pro-resolving mediators. Single nucleotide polymorphism differences in the genes that promote ALOX5 activity (i.e. 5-lipoxygenase-activating protein), metabolize the initial product of ALOX5, 5S-HpETE, to LTB4 (i.e. leukotriene-A4 hydrolase), or are the cellular receptors responsible for mediating the cellular responses to the down-stream ALOX products LTC4 and LTD4 (i.e. CYSLTR1 and CYSLTR2) have been associated with the presence of asthma in single population studies. These studies suggest genetic variants may play a role, albeit a relatively minor one, in the overall susceptibility to allergic asthma.

=== NSAID-induced non-allergic reactions ===
Aspirin and other non-steroidal anti-inflammatory drugs (NSAID) can cause NSAID-exacerbated diseases (N-ERD). These have been recently classified into 5 groups 3 of which are not caused by a classical immune mechanism and are relevant to the function of ALOX5: 1) NSAIDs-exacerbated respiratory disease (NERD), i.e. symptoms of bronchial airways obstruction, shortness of breath, and/or nasal congestion/rhinorrhea occurring shortly after NSAID ingestion in patients with a history of asthma and/or rhinosinusitis; 2) NSAIDs-exacerbated cutaneous disease (NECD), i.e. wheal responses and/or angioedema responses occurring shortly after NSAID ingestion in patients with a history of chronic urticaria; and 3) NSAIDs-induced urticaria/angioedema (NIUA) (i.e. wheals and/or angioedema symptoms occurring shortly after NSAID ingestion in patients with no history of chronic urticaria). The genetic single-nucleotide polymorphism (SNP) variant in the ALOX5 gene, ALOX5-1708 G>A is associated with NSAID-induced asthma in Korean patients and three SNP ALOX5 variants, rs4948672, rs1565096, and rs7894352, are associated with NSAID-induced cutaneous reactions in Spanish patients.

=== Atherosclerosis ===
Bearers of two variations in the predominant five tandem repeat Sp1 binding motif (GGGCCGG) of the ALOX5 gene promoter in 470 subjects (non-Hispanic whites, 55.1%; Hispanics, 29.6%; Asian or Pacific Islander, 7.7&; African Americans, 5.3%, and others, 2.3%) were positively associated with the severity of atherosclerosis, as judged by carotid intima–media thickness measurements. Variant alleles involved deletions (one or two) or additions (one, two, or three) of Sp1 motifs to the five tandem motifs allele.

== See also ==
Arachidonate 5-lipoxygenase inhibitor
