= C30H47N3O9S =

The molecular formula C_{30}H_{47}N_{3}O_{9}S (molar mass: 625.78 g/mol) may refer to:

- Eoxin C4, or 14,15-leukotriene C4
- Leukotriene C4
