= Leukotriene =

Class of inflammation mediator molecules

LTA_{4} Note the four double bonds, three of them conjugated. This is a common property of A4, B4, C4, D4, and E4.

LTB_{4}

LTC_{4} is a cysteinyl leukotriene, as are D4 and E4.

LTD_{4}

LTE_{4}

Leukotrienes are members of a family of eicosanoid inflammatory mediators produced in leukocytes by the oxidation of arachidonic acid (AA) and the essential fatty acid eicosapentaenoic acid (EPA) by the enzyme arachidonate 5-lipoxygenase.

Leukotrienes use lipid signaling to convey information to either the cell producing them (autocrine signaling) or neighboring cells (paracrine signaling) in order to regulate immune responses. The production of leukotrienes is usually accompanied by the production of histamine and prostaglandins, which also act as inflammatory mediators.

The role of one type of leukotriene (specifically, leukotriene D_{4}) is to trigger contractions in the smooth muscles lining the bronchioles; their overproduction is a major cause of inflammation in asthma and allergic rhinitis. Leukotriene antagonists are used to treat these disorders by inhibiting the production or activity of leukotrienes.

== History and name ==
The name leukotriene, introduced by Swedish biochemist Bengt Samuelsson in 1979, comes from the words leukocyte and triene (indicating the compound's three conjugated double bonds). What would be later named leukotriene C, "slow reaction smooth muscle-stimulating substance" (SRS) was originally described between 1938 and 1940 by Feldberg and Kellaway. The researchers isolated SRS from lung tissue after a prolonged period following exposure to snake venom and histamine.

== Types ==
=== Cysteinyl leukotrienes ===
LTC_{4}, LTD_{4}, LTE_{4} and LTF_{4} are often called cysteinyl leukotrienes due to the presence of the amino acid cysteine in their structure. The cysteinyl leukotrienes make up the slow-reacting substance of anaphylaxis (SRS-A). LTF_{4}, like LTD_{4}, is a metabolite of LTC_{4}, but, unlike LTD_{4}, which lacks the glutamic residue of glutathione, LTF_{4} lacks the glycine residue of glutathione.

=== LTB_{4} ===
LTB_{4} is synthesized in vivo from LTA_{4} by the enzyme LTA_{4} hydrolase. Its primary function is to recruit neutrophils to areas of tissue damage, though it also helps promote the production of inflammatory cytokines by various immune cells. Drugs that block the actions of LTB_{4} have shown some efficacy in slowing the progression of neutrophil-mediated diseases.

=== LTG_{4} ===
There has also been postulated the existence of LTG_{4}, a metabolite of LTE_{4} in which the cysteinyl moiety has been oxidized to an alpha-keto-acid (i.e.—the cysteine has been replaced by a pyruvate). Very little is known about this putative leukotriene.

=== LTB_{5} ===
Leukotrienes originating from the omega-3 class eicosapentanoic acid (EPA) have diminished inflammatory effects. In human subjects whose diets have been supplemented with eicosapentaenoic acid, leukotrine B5, along with leukotrine B4, is produced by neutrophils. LTB_{5} induces aggregation of rat neutrophils, chemokinesis of human polymorphonuclear neutrophils (PMN), lysosomal enzyme release from human PMN and potentiation of bradykinin-induced plasma exudation, although compared to LTB_{4}, it has at least 30 times less potency.

== Biochemistry ==
=== Synthesis ===
Eicosanoid synthesis. (Leukotrienes at right.)

Leukotrienes are synthesized in the cell from arachidonic acid by arachidonate 5-lipoxygenase. The catalytic mechanism involves the insertion of an oxygen moiety at a specific position in the arachidonic acid backbone.

The lipoxygenase pathway is active in leukocytes and other immunocompetent cells, including Dendritic cell, mast cells, eosinophils, neutrophils, monocytes, and basophils. When such cells are activated, arachidonic acid is liberated from cell membrane phospholipids by phospholipase A2, and donated by the 5-lipoxygenase-activating protein (FLAP) to 5-lipoxygenase.

5-Lipoxygenase (5-LO) uses FLAP to convert arachidonic acid into 5-hydroperoxyeicosatetraenoic acid (5-HPETE), which spontaneously reduces to 5-hydroxyeicosatetraenoic acid (5-HETE). The enzyme 5-LO acts again on 5-HETE to convert it into leukotriene A_{4} (LTA_{4}), an unstable epoxide. 5-HETE can be further metabolized to 5-oxo-ETE and 5-oxo-15-hydroxy-ETE, all of which have pro-inflammatory actions similar but not identical to those of LTB_{4} and mediated not by LTB_{4} receptors but rather by the OXE receptor (see 5-Hydroxyeicosatetraenoic acid and 5-Oxo-eicosatetraenoic acid).

In cells equipped with LTA hydrolase, such as neutrophils and monocytes, LTA_{4} is converted to the dihydroxy acid leukotriene LTB_{4}, which is a powerful chemoattractant for neutrophils acting at BLT_{1} and BLT_{2} receptors on the plasma membrane of these cells.

In cells that express LTC_{4} synthase, such as mast cells and eosinophils, LTA_{4} is conjugated with the tripeptide glutathione to form the first of the cysteinyl-leukotrienes, LTC_{4}. Outside the cell, LTC_{4} can be converted by ubiquitous enzymes to form successively LTD_{4} and LTE_{4}, which retain biological activity.

The cysteinyl-leukotrienes act at their cell-surface receptors CysLT1 and CysLT2 on target cells to contract bronchial and vascular smooth muscle, to increase permeability of small blood vessels, to enhance secretion of mucus in the airway and gut, and to recruit leukocytes to sites of inflammation.

Both LTB_{4} and the cysteinyl-leukotrienes (LTC_{4}, LTD_{4}, LTE_{4}) are partly degraded in local tissues, and ultimately become inactive metabolites in the liver.

=== Function ===
Leukotrienes act principally on a subfamily of G protein-coupled receptors. They may also act upon peroxisome proliferator-activated receptors. Leukotrienes are involved in asthmatic and allergic reactions and act to sustain inflammatory reactions. Several leukotriene receptor antagonists such as montelukast and zafirlukast are used to treat asthma. Recent research points to a role of 5-lipoxygenase in cardiovascular and neuropsychiatric illnesses.

Leukotrienes are very important agents in the inflammatory response. Some such as LTB_{4} have a chemotactic effect on migrating neutrophils, and as such help to bring the necessary cells to the tissue. Leukotrienes also have a powerful effect in bronchoconstriction and increase vascular permeability.

== Leukotrienes in asthma ==
Leukotrienes contribute to the pathophysiology of asthma, especially in patients with aspirin-exacerbated respiratory disease (AERD), and cause or potentiate the following symptoms:

- Airflow obstruction
- Increased secretion of mucus
- Mucosal accumulation
- Bronchoconstriction
- Infiltration of inflammatory cells in the airway wall

=== Role of cysteinyl leukotrienes ===
Cysteinyl leukotriene receptors CYSLTR1 and CYSLTR2 are present on mast cells, eosinophil, and endothelial cells. During cysteinyl leukotriene interaction, they can stimulate proinflammatory activities such as endothelial cell adherence and chemokine production by mast cells. As well as mediating inflammation, they induce asthma and other inflammatory disorders, thereby reducing the airflow to the alveoli. The levels of cysteinyl leukotrienes, along with 8-isoprostane, have been reported to be increased in the EBC of patients with asthma, correlating with disease severity. Cysteinyl leukotrienes may also play a role in adverse drug reactions in general and in contrast medium induced adverse reactions in particular.

In excess, the cysteinyl leukotrienes can induce anaphylactic shock.

== See also ==
- Eoxins (14,15-leukotrienes)
- Wittig reaction § Example
