= Dipeptidase =

Enzymes secreted by enterocytes into the small intestine

Dipeptidases are enzymes secreted by enterocytes into the small intestine. Dipeptidases hydrolyze bound pairs of amino acids, called dipeptides.

Dipeptidases are secreted onto the brush border of the villi in the small intestine, where they cleave dipeptides into their two component amino acids prior to absorption. They are also found within the enterocytes themselves, performing cytosolic digestion of absorbed dipeptides.

Dipeptidases are exopeptidases, classified under EC number 3.4.13.

== See also ==
- Membrane dipeptidase
