= Leukotriene A4 =

Leukotriene A_{4}

Names
- Preferred IUPAC name 4-{(2S,3S)-3-[(1E,3E,5Z,8Z)-Tetradeca-1,3,5,8-tetraen-1-yl]oxiran-2-yl}butanoic acid

Identifiers
CAS Number	72059-45-1
3D model (JSmol)	Interactive image
Abbreviations	LTA_{4}
ChEBI	CHEBI:15651
ChemSpider	4444074
IUPHAR/BPS	5214
KEGG	C00909
MeSH	D017572
PubChem CID	5280383
UNII	7Y7MPZ6563
CompTox Dashboard (EPA)	DTXSID40903945
- InChI: InChI=1S/C20H30O3/c1-2-3-4-5-6-7-8-9-10-11-12-13-15-18-19(23-18)16-14-17-20(21)22/h6-7,9-13,15,18-19H,2-5,8,14,16-17H2,1H3,(H,21,22)/b7-6-,10-9-,12-11+,15-13+/t18-,19-/m0/s1 Key: UFPQIRYSPUYQHK-WAQVJNLQSA-N; InChI=1/C20H30O3/c1-2-3-4-5-6-7-8-9-10-11-12-13-15-18-19(23-18)16-14-17-20(21)22/h6-7,9-13,15,18-19H,2-5,8,14,16-17H2,1H3,(H,21,22)/b7-6-,10-9-,12-11+,15-13+/t18-,19-/m0/s1 Key: UFPQIRYSPUYQHK-WAQVJNLQBZ
- SMILES: CCCCC/C=C\C/C=C\C=C\C=C\[C@H]1[C@@H](O1)CCCC(=O)O

Properties
Chemical formula	C_{20}H_{30}O_{3}
Molar mass	318.457 g·mol^{−1}
- Except where otherwise noted, data are given for materials in their standard state (at 25 °C [77 °F], 100 kPa). verify (what is ?) Infobox references

Leukotriene A_{4} (LTA_{4}) is a leukotriene, and is the precursor for the productions of leukotriene B_{4} (LTB_{4}) and leukotriene C_{4} (LTC_{4}).

== Biosynthesis ==
Following the biosynthesis of eicosanoid, triggered as a result of infection or inflammation, the resulting arachidonic acid substrate is released from the cell membrane phospholipid will enter the lipooxygenase pathway to produce leukotriene A_{4}. In this pathway, arachidonic acid is converted into 5-hydroperoxyeicosatetraenoic acid (5-HPETE) as a result of a catalytic complex consisting of the enzyme 5-lipoxygenase (5-LO) and 5-lipoxygenase-activating protein (FLAP) in the presence of ATP and calcium ions. The resulting 5-HPETE yields the unstable allylic epoxide substrate LTA_{4} which is quickly hydrolyzed by the leukotriene A4 hydrolase (LTA_{4}H) enzyme to produce LTB_{4}, or synthesized by leukotriene C4 synthase (LTC_{4}S) with the addition of glutathione to produce LTC_{4} which can be further metabolized to produce leukotriene D_{4} (LTD_{4}) and leukotriene E_{4} (LTE_{4}). The lipooxygenase pathway is one of several possible pathways including the cyclooxygenase pathway (also PGH synthase pathway), isoprostane pathway, and cytochrome P450 epoxygenases pathway following the arachidonic acid metabolism, but is the only pathway in which the subsequent steps will lead to the production of leukotrienes.

Eicosanoid synthesis' subsequent release of arachidonic acid will enter a pathway dependent on what molecule the body requires of the arachidonic acid to be converted into. (Right) The arachidonic acid will undergo the lipooxygenase pathway to produce leukotriene A_{4} and subsequent leukotrienes in the case of inflammation.
