= Leukotriene C4 synthase =

Protein-coding gene in the species Homo sapiens

LTC4S
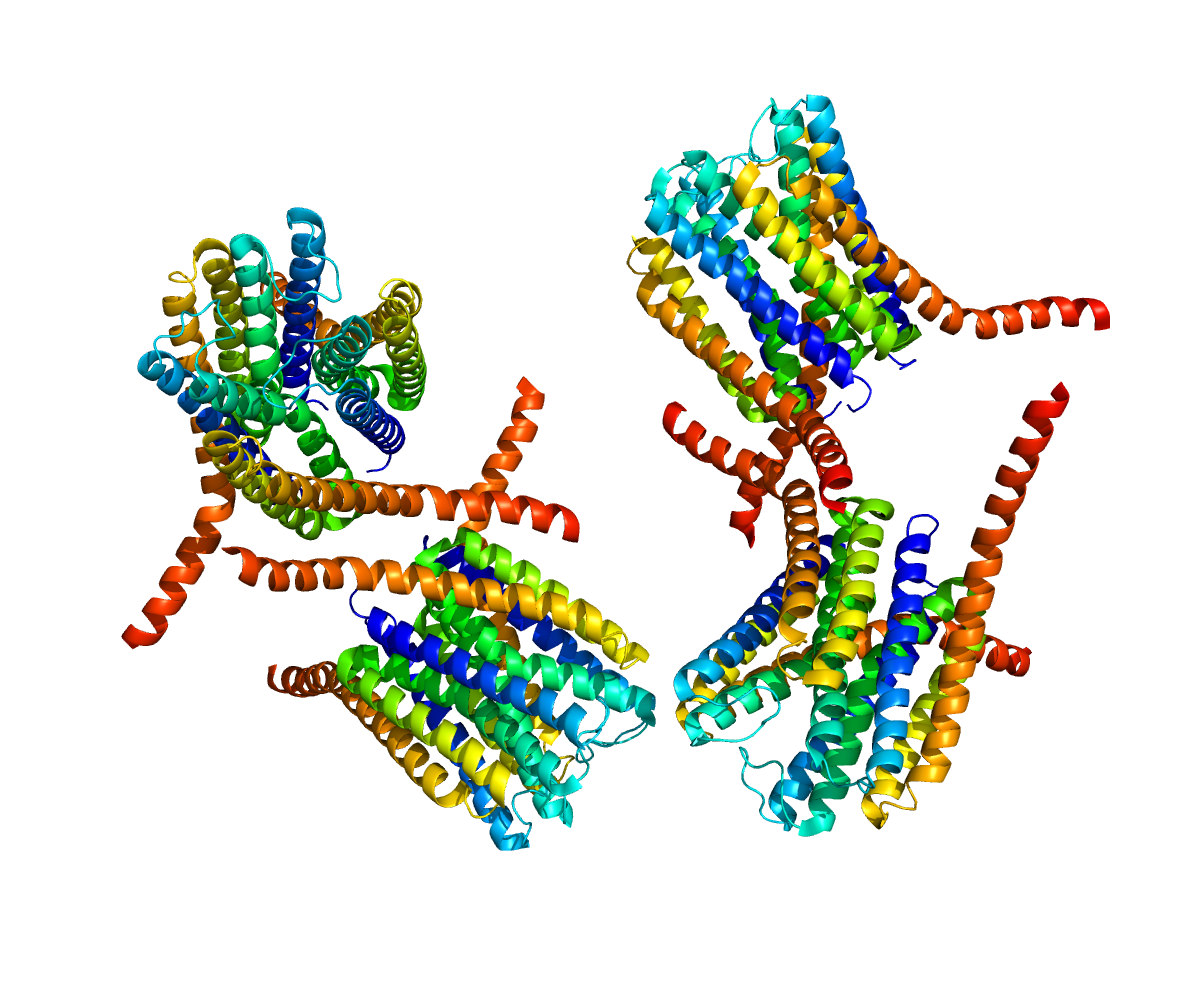
Available structures
PDB	Ortholog search: PDBe RCSB
PDB	List of PDB id codes 4JRZ, 2PNO, 2UUH, 2UUI, 3B29, 3HKK, 3LEO, 3PCV, 4J7T, 4J7Y, 4JC7, 4JCZ, 5HV9, 4WAB

Identifiers
- Aliases: LTC4S, entrez:4056, Leukotriene C4 synthase
- External IDs: OMIM: 246530; MGI: 107498; HomoloGene: 7406; GeneCards: LTC4S; OMA:LTC4S - orthologs

Gene location (Human)
Chr.	Chromosome 5 (human)
Band	5q35.3	Start	179,793,980 bp
Band	5q35.3	End	179,796,647 bp

Gene location (Mouse)
Chr.	Chromosome 11 (mouse)
Band	11|11 B1.3	Start	50,127,288 bp
Band	11|11 B1.3	End	50,129,443 bp
RNA expression pattern
Bgee	Human / Mouse (ortholog); Top expressed in: right uterine tube; testicle; apex of heart; right coronary artery; left uterine tube; right auricle of heart; left coronary artery; right adrenal cortex; olfactory zone of nasal mucosa; right hemisphere of cerebellum / Top expressed in: choroid plexus of fourth ventricle; lactiferous gland; white adipose tissue; subcutaneous adipose tissue; brown adipose tissue; stroma of bone marrow; right kidney; embryo; primary oocyte; Epithelium of choroid plexus; More reference expression data
BioGPS	n/a
Gene ontology
Molecular function	leukotriene-C4 synthase activity; glutathione peroxidase activity; protein binding; lyase activity; enzyme activator activity; lipid binding; identical protein binding; glutathione transferase activity
Cellular component	integral component of membrane; membrane; nuclear envelope; endoplasmic reticulum; nuclear outer membrane; nucleus; intracellular membrane-bounded organelle; endoplasmic reticulum membrane
Biological process	positive regulation of catalytic activity; leukotriene biosynthetic process; cellular oxidant detoxification; leukotriene metabolic process; long-chain fatty acid biosynthetic process; lipoxygenase pathway; lipoxin biosynthetic process
Sources:Amigo / QuickGO
Orthologs
Species	Human	Mouse
Entrez	4056	17001
Ensembl	ENSG00000283887; ENSG00000213316	ENSMUSG00000020377
UniProt	Q16873	Q60860
RefSeq (mRNA)	NM_145867; NM_000897	NM_008521; NM_001313968
RefSeq (protein)	NP_665874	NP_001300897; NP_032547
Location (UCSC)	Chr 5: 179.79 – 179.8 Mb	Chr 11: 50.13 – 50.13 Mb
PubMed search
- Wikidata
View/Edit Human	View/Edit Mouse

Leukotriene C4 synthase is an enzyme that in humans is encoded by the LTC4S gene.

The protein encoded by this gene, LTC4S (or glutathione S-transferase II) is an enzyme that converts leukotriene A4 and glutathione to create leukotriene C4. This is a member of MAPEG family of transmembrane proteins. A trimer of Leukotriene C4 synthase is localized on the outer nuclear membrane and endoplasmic reticulum, where it forms a complex with 5-Lipoxygenase-activating protein. This protein is remotely related to microsomal glutathione S-transferase.

== Function ==
The MAPEG (Membrane-Associated Proteins in Eicosanoid and Glutathione metabolism) family includes a number of human proteins, several of which are involved the production of leukotrienes. This gene encodes an enzyme that catalyzes the first step in the biosynthesis of cysteinyl leukotrienes, potent biological compounds derived from arachidonic acid. Leukotrienes have been implicated as mediators of anaphylaxis and inflammatory conditions such as human bronchial asthma. This protein localizes to the nuclear envelope and adjacent endoplasmic reticulum.

Eicosanoid synthesis. (Leukotrienes at right.)
