= Leukotriene C4 =

Leukotriene C_{4}

Names
- Systematic IUPAC name (5S,6R,7E,9E,11Z,14Z)-6-({(2R)-2-[(4S)-4-Amino-4-carboxybutanamido]-3-[(carboxymethyl)amino]-3-oxopropyl}sulfanyl)-5-hydroxyicosa-7,9,11,14-tetraenoic acid

Identifiers
CAS Number	72025-60-6
3D model (JSmol)	Interactive image
ChEBI	CHEBI:16978
ChemSpider	4444133
ECHA InfoCard	100.212.805
EC Number	200-659-6
KEGG	C02166
MeSH	Leukotriene+C4
PubChem CID	5280493
UNII	2CU6TT9V48
CompTox Dashboard (EPA)	DTXSID00903946
- InChI: InChI=1S/C30H47N3O9S/c1-2-3-4-5-6-7-8-9-10-11-12-13-16-25(24(34)15-14-17-27(36)37)43-21-23(29(40)32-20-28(38)39)33-26(35)19-18-22(31)30(41)42/h6-7,9-13,16,22-25,34H,2-5,8,14-15,17-21,31H2,1H3,(H,32,40)(H,33,35)(H,36,37)(H,38,39)(H,41,42)/b7-6-,10-9-,12-11+,16-13+/t22-,23-,24-,25+/m0/s1 Key: GWNVDXQDILPJIG-NXOLIXFESA-N; InChI=1/C30H47N3O9S/c1-2-3-4-5-6-7-8-9-10-11-12-13-16-25(24(34)15-14-17-27(36)37)43-21-23(29(40)32-20-28(38)39)33-26(35)19-18-22(31)30(41)42/h6-7,9-13,16,22-25,34H,2-5,8,14-15,17-21,31H2,1H3,(H,32,40)(H,33,35)(H,36,37)(H,38,39)(H,41,42)/b7-6-,10-9-,12-11+,16-13+/t22-,23-,24-,25+/m0/s1 Key: GWNVDXQDILPJIG-NXOLIXFEBR
- SMILES: CCCCC/C=C\C/C=C\C=C\C=C\[C@H]([C@H](CCCC(=O)O)O)SC[C@@H](/C(=N/CC(=O)O)/O)/N=C(\CC[C@@H](C(=O)O)N)/O

Properties
Chemical formula	C_{30}H_{47}N_{3}O_{9}S
Molar mass	625.78 g·mol^{−1}
- Except where otherwise noted, data are given for materials in their standard state (at 25 °C [77 °F], 100 kPa). verify (what is ?) Infobox references

Leukotriene C_{4} (LTC_{4}) is a leukotriene. LTC_{4} has been extensively studied in the context of allergy and asthma. In cells of myeloid origin such as mast cells, its biosynthesis is orchestrated by translocation to the nuclear envelope along with co-localization of cytosolic phospholipase A2 (cPLA2), arachidonate 5-lipoxygenase (5-LO), 5-lipoxygenase-activating protein (FLAP) and LTC_{4} synthase (LTC_{4}S), which couples glutathione to an LTA_{4} intermediate. The MRP1 transporter then secretes cytosolic LTC_{4} and cell surface proteases further metabolize it by sequential cleavage of the γ-glutamyl and glycine residues off its glutathione segment, generating the more stable products LTD_{4} and LTE_{4}. All three leukotrienes then bind at different affinities to two G-protein coupled receptors: CYSLTR1 and CYSLTR2, triggering pulmonary vasoconstriction and bronchoconstriction.

In cells of non-haematopoietic lineage, endoplasmic reticulum (ER) stress and chemotherapy induce LTC_{4} biosynthesis by transcriptionally upregulating and activating the enzyme microsomal glutathione-S-transferase 2 (MGST2). ER stress and chemotherapy also trigger nuclear translocation of the two LTC_{4} receptors. Acting in an intracrine manner, LTC_{4} then elicits nuclear translocation of NADPH oxidase 4 (NOX4), ROS accumulation and oxidative DNA damage. Besides being a potent lipid mediator in asthma and inflammation, LTC_{4} was reported to be involved in several other diseases, such as allergic airway diseases, dermatological diseases, cardiovascular diseases, liver injury, atherosclerosis and colon cancer.

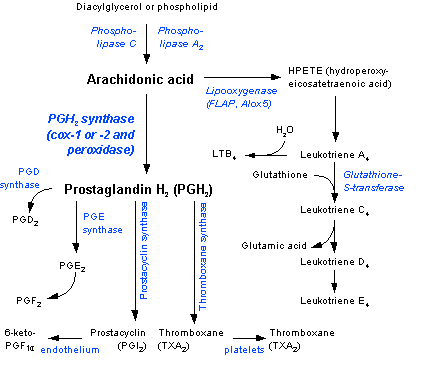
Eicosanoid synthesis. (Leukotrienes at right.)
