= Leukotriene E4 =

Leukotriene E_{4}

Names
- Systematic IUPAC name (5S,6R,7E,9E,11Z,14Z)-6-({(2R)-2-Amino-2-carboxyethyl}sulfanyl)-5-hydroxyicosa-7,9,11,14-tetraenoic acid

Identifiers
CAS Number	75715-89-8
3D model (JSmol)	Interactive image
Abbreviations	LTE4
ChEBI	CHEBI:15650
ChemSpider	4444402
KEGG	C05952
MeSH	Leukotriene+E4
PubChem CID	5280749
UNII	8EYT8ATL7G
CompTox Dashboard (EPA)	DTXSID20897510
- InChI: InChI=1S/C23H37NO5S/c1-2-3-4-5-6-7-8-9-10-11-12-13-16-21(30-18-19(24)23(28)29)20(25)15-14-17-22(26)27/h6-7,9-13,16,19-21,25H,2-5,8,14-15,17-18,24H2,1H3,(H,26,27)(H,28,29)/b7-6-,10-9-,12-11+,16-13+/t19?,20-,21+/m0/s1 Key: OTZRAYGBFWZKMX-MPWKMEBCSA-N
- SMILES: CCCCC/C=C\C/C=C\C=C\C=C\[C@H]([C@H](CCCC(=O)O)O)SCC(C(=O)O)N

Properties
Chemical formula	C_{23}H_{37}NO_{5}S
Molar mass	439.61 g·mol^{−1}
- Except where otherwise noted, data are given for materials in their standard state (at 25 °C [77 °F], 100 kPa). Infobox references

Leukotriene E_{4} (LTE_{4}) is a cysteinyl leukotriene involved in inflammation. It is known to be produced by several types of white blood cells, including eosinophils, mast cells, tissue macrophages, and basophils, and recently was also found to be produced by platelets adhering to neutrophils. It is formed from the sequential conversion of LTC_{4} to LTD_{4} and then to LTE_{4}, which is the final and most stable cysteinyl leukotriene. Compared to the short half lives of LTC_{4} and LTD_{4}, LTE_{4} is relatively stable and accumulates in breath condensation, in plasma, and in urine, making it the dominant cysteinyl leukotriene detected in biologic fluids. Therefore, measurements of LTE_{4}, especially in the urine, are commonly monitored in clinical research studies.

Increased production and excretion of LTE_{4} has been linked to several respiratory diseases, and urinary LTE_{4} levels are increased during severe asthma attacks and are especially high in people with aspirin-exacerbated respiratory disease.

Studies have suggested that LTE_{4} works through its own distinct receptor, and although one has not yet been discovered, research is ongoing to isolate and characterize an LTE_{4}-specific receptor.

Eicosanoid synthesis (leukotrienes at right)
