= Leukotriene D4 =

Leukotriene D_{4}

Names
- Systematic IUPAC name (5S,6R,7E,9E,11Z,14Z)-6-({(2R)-2-Amino-3-[(carboxymethyl)amino]-3-oxopropyl}sulfanyl)-5-hydroxyicosa-7,9,11,14-tetraenoic acid

Identifiers
CAS Number	73836-78-9
3D model (JSmol)	Interactive image
ChEBI	CHEBI:28666
ChEMBL	ChEMBL288943
ChemSpider	4444401
MeSH	Leukotriene+D4
PubChem CID	5280878
UNII	5FNY4416UE
CompTox Dashboard (EPA)	DTXSID6040533
- InChI: InChI=1S/C25H40N2O6S/c1-2-3-4-5-6-7-8-9-10-11-12-13-16-22(21(28)15-14-17-23(29)30)34-19-20(26)25(33)27-18-24(31)32/h6-7,9-13,16,20-22,28H,2-5,8,14-15,17-19,26H2,1H3,(H,27,33)(H,29,30)(H,31,32)/b7-6-,10-9-,12-11+,16-13+/t20-,21-,22+/m0/s1 Key: YEESKJGWJFYOOK-IJHYULJSSA-N; InChI=1/C25H40N2O6S/c1-2-3-4-5-6-7-8-9-10-11-12-13-16-22(21(28)15-14-17-23(29)30)34-19-20(26)25(33)27-18-24(31)32/h6-7,9-13,16,20-22,28H,2-5,8,14-15,17-19,26H2,1H3,(H,27,33)(H,29,30)(H,31,32)/b7-6-,10-9-,12-11+,16-13+/t20-,21-,22+/m0/s1 Key: YEESKJGWJFYOOK-IJHYULJSBX
- SMILES: CCCCC\C=C/C\C=C/C=C/C=C/[C@@H](SC[C@H](N)C(=O)NCC(=O)O)[C@@H](O)CCCC(=O)O

Properties
Chemical formula	C_{25}H_{40}N_{2}O_{6}S
Molar mass	496.66 g·mol^{−1}
- Except where otherwise noted, data are given for materials in their standard state (at 25 °C [77 °F], 100 kPa). verify (what is ?) Infobox references

Leukotriene D_{4} (LTD_{4}) is one of the leukotrienes. Its main function in the body is to induce the contraction of smooth muscle, resulting in bronchoconstriction and vasoconstriction. It also increases vascular permeability. LTD_{4} is released by basophils. Other leukotrienes that function in a similar manner are leukotrienes C_{4} and E_{4}. Pharmacological agents that inhibit the function of these leukotrienes are leukotriene receptor antagonists (e.g., zafirlukast, montelukast) and are useful for asthmatic individuals.

Eicosanoid synthesis. (Leukotrienes at right.)
