= Lipoxin =

Acronym for lipoxygenase interaction product

Lipoxins A_{4} and B_{4}
- Lipoxin A_{4}

- Lipoxin B_{4}

Names
- Preferred IUPAC name A4: (5S,6R,7E,9E,11Z,13E,15S)-5,6,15-Trihydroxyicosa-7,9,11,13-tetraenoic acid B4: (5S,6E,8Z,10E,12E,14R,15S)-5,14,15-Trihydroxyicosa-6,8,10,12-tetraenoic acid
- Other names LXA4 and LXB4

Identifiers
CAS Number	89663-86-5 A4; 98049-69-5 B4
3D model (JSmol)	A4: Interactive image; B4: Interactive image
ChEBI	CHEBI:6498; CHEBI:6499
ChemSpider	4444429 A4; 4444430 B4
IUPHAR/BPS	1034 A4; 5216 B4
PubChem CID	5280914 A4; 5280915 B4
UNII	F7C6J3D79J
- InChI: InChI=1S/C20H32O5/c1-2-3-8-14-18(22)19(23)15-10-7-5-4-6-9-12-17(21)13-11-16-20(24)25/h4-7,9-10,12,15,17-19,21-23H,2-3,8,11,13-14,16H2,1H3,(H,24,25)/b6-4-,7-5+,12-9+,15-10+/t17-,18+,19-/m1/s1 Key: UXVRTOKOJOMENI-WLPVFMORSA-N; A4: InChI=1S/C20H32O5/c1-2-3-8-12-17(21)13-9-6-4-5-7-10-14-18(22)19(23)15-11-16-20(24)25/h4-7,9-10,13-14,17-19,21-23H,2-3,8,11-12,15-16H2,1H3,(H,24,25)/b6-4-,7-5+,13-9+,14-10+/t17-,18+,19-/m0/s1 Key: IXAQOQZEOGMIQS-SSQFXEBMSA-N; B4: InChI=1S/C20H32O5/c1-2-3-8-14-18(22)19(23)15-10-7-5-4-6-9-12-17(21)13-11-16-20(24)25/h4-7,9-10,12,15,17-19,21-23H,2-3,8,11,13-14,16H2,1H3,(H,24,25)/b6-4-,7-5+,12-9+,15-10+/t17-,18+,19-/m1/s1 Key: UXVRTOKOJOMENI-WLPVFMORSA-N
- SMILES: A4: CCCCC[C@H](O)C=C\C=C/C=CC=CC(O)C(O)CCCC(O)=O; B4: O=C(O)CCC[C@H](O)/C=C/C=C\C=C\C=C\[C@@H](O)[C@@H](O)CCCCC

Properties
Chemical formula	C_{20}H_{32}O_{5}
Molar mass	352.46508 g/mol
- Except where otherwise noted, data are given for materials in their standard state (at 25 °C [77 °F], 100 kPa). verify (what is ?) Infobox references

A lipoxin (LX or Lx), an acronym for lipoxygenase interaction product, is a bioactive autacoid metabolite of arachidonic acid made by various cell types. They are categorized as nonclassic eicosanoids and members of the specialized pro-resolving mediator (SPM) family of polyunsaturated fatty acid (PUFA) metabolites. Like other SPMs, LXs form during an inflammatory response and act to resolve it. The first lipoxins identified were lipoxin A_{4} (LXA_{4}) and lipoxin B_{4} (LXB_{4}), followed by their respective epimers, the epi-lipoxins 15-epi-LXA_{4} and 15-epi-LXB_{4}.

== History ==
LXA_{4} and LXB_{4} were first described by Charles Serhan, Mats Hamberg, and Bengt Samuelsson in 1984. They reported that human blood neutrophils, when stimulated, make these two lipoxins and that neutrophils, when stimulated by either of the LXs, mounted superoxide anion (O_{2}^{−}) generation and degranulation responses. Both responses are considered to be pro-inflammatory in that, while aimed at neutralizing invading pathogens and digesting foreign material, can contribute to damaging host tissues and thereby prolonging and promoting further inflammation. Subsequent studies, however, found that these lipoxins, as well as their epimers, epi-LXA_{4} and LXB_{4}, act primarily to dampen and resolve inflammation, i.e. they are anti-inflammatory cell signaling agents.

== Biochemistry ==
Lipoxins are derived enzymatically from arachidonic acid, an ω−6 fatty acid. Structurally, they are defined as arachidonic acid metabolites that contain three hydroxyl residues (also termed hydroxy residues) and four double bonds. This structural definition distinguishes them from other specialized pro-resolving mediators (SPMs), such as the resolvins, neuroprotectins, and maresins. All of these SPMs have activities and functions similar, although not necessarily identical, to the lipoxins.

=== Synthesis ===
Formation of LXs is conserved across a broad range of animal species from fish to humans. Biosynthesis of the LXs requires two separate enzymatic attacks on arachidonic acid (AA). One attack involves attachment of a hydroperoxy (-O-OH) residue to carbon 15, conversion of this species to a 14,15-epoxide, and the resolution of this epoxide to form either 14,15-dihydroxy-eicosatetraenoate or 15-hydroxy-eicosatetraenoate products. This step is catalyzed by enzymes with 15-lipoxygenase activity, which in humans includes ALOX15, ALOX12, aspirin-treated cyclooxygenase 2, and cytochrome P450s of the microsomal, mitochondrial, or bacterial subclasses. ALOX15B may also conduct this metabolism. The other enzyme attack point forms a 5,6-epoxide which is resolved to either 5,6-dihydroxy-eicosatetraenoate or 5-hydroxy eicosatetraenoate products; this step catalyzed by 5-lipoxygenase (ALOX5). Accordingly, these double oxygenations yield either 5,6,15-trihydroxy- or 5,14,15-trihydroxy-eicosatetraenoates. The double oxygenations may be conducted within a single cell type which possesses ALOX5 and an enzyme with 15-lipoxygenase activity or, alternatively, by two different cell types, each of which possesses one of these enzyme activities. In the latter transcellular biosynthetic pathway, one cell type forms either the 5,6-dihydroxy-, 5-hydroxy-, 14,15-dihydroxy- or a 15-hydroxy-eicosatetraenoate, and then passes this intermediate to a second cell type, which metabolizes it to the final LX product. For example, LXs are formed by platelets which, lacking ALOX5, cannot synthesize them. Rather, neutrophils form the 5,6-epoxide leukotriene A_{4} (LTA_{4}) via ALOX5, and pass it to platelets that then reduce it to a 5,6-dihydroxy-eicosateteraenoate product and further metabolize it through ALOX12 to form the 15-hydroxy product, LXA_{4}. The two LXs are distinguished from their 15-epi-LTX epimers by their structural formulae:

- LxA_{4}: 5S,6R,15S-trihydroxy-7E,9E,11Z,13E-eicosatetraenoic acid
- LxB_{4}: 5S,14R,15S-trihydroxy-6E,8Z,10E,12E-eicosatetraenoic acid
- 15-epi-LxA_{4}: 5S,6R,15R-trihydroxy-7E,9E,11Z,13E-eicosatetraenoic acid
- 15-epi-LxB_{4}: 5S,14R,15R-trihydroxy-6E,8Z,10E,12E-eicosatetraenoic acid

Note that the two LXs have their 15-hydroxyl residues in the S chirality configuration because all of the ALOX enzymes form 15S-hydroxy AA products. In contrast, the 15-hydroxy residues of the two epi-LXs are 15R chirality products because they are synthesized by aspirin-treated cyclooxygenase 2 or the microsomal, mitochondrial, or bacterial cytochrome P450s; these enzymes form almost entirely or partly 15R-hydroxy products. (15-Epi-LxA_{4} and 15-epi-LxB_{4} are sometimes termed AT-LxA_{4} and AT-LxB_{4}, respectively, when acknowledging their formation by aspirin-treated cyclooxygenase 2, i.e. by Aspirin-Triggered cyclooxygenase 2.)

In addition to the pathways cited above, other transcellular metabolic routes have been shown to make LXs. For example, 5-lipoxygenase (i.e. ALOX5) in neutrophils and 15-lipoxygenase-1 (i.e. ALOX15) in immature erythrocytes and reticulocytes operate in series to form LxA_{4} and LxB_{4}; this pathway also occurs in serial interactions between neutrophils and eosinophils; between epithelium or M2 macrophages/monocytes and neutrophils; and endothelium or skeletal muscle and neutrophils.

=== Stimulation of synthesis ===
The lipoxins commonly form as a consequence of stimulating the production of pro-inflammatory arachidonic acid metabolites. However, certain cytokines such as IFN-γ and IL-1β further increase production of the lipoxins (as well as other anti-inflammatory PUFA metabolites and proteins, e.g. IL4).

=== Further metabolism ===
LXs are rapidly metabolized, mainly by macrophages, to inactive products by being oxidized at carbon 15 to form 15-keto (also termed 15-oxo) LX products by a 15-hydroxyprostaglandin dehydrogenase; 15-oxo-LXA_{4} may be further metabolized to 13,14-dihydro-LXA_{4} by an oxidoreductase. 15-Epi-LXA_{4} and 15-epi-LXB_{4} are more resistant to the dehydrogenation enzyme than their LX epimers. In consequence of the operation of this anabolic pathway, LXs have very short half-lives in vivo. The epi-LXs have longer in vivo half-lives and thereby greater potencies than their LX epimers, and synthetic lipoxins that are metabolically resistant to this pathway have been prepared, used in animal models to study LX activities, and tested as potential therapeutic agents in animals and humans.

Similar to various other AA metabolites such as LTA_{4} and 5-oxo-eicosatetraenoic acid, cells and tissues may convert LXs to 20-hydroxy products by omega oxidation; they also have been shown to ligate LXA_{4} to glutathione to form cysteinyl-lipoxins, initially LXC_{4}, which is then sequentially metabolized to LXD_{4} and LXE_{4}. The role of these pathways in limiting or contributing to the activity of the LXs has not been fully evaluated.

=== Endocannabinoid system ===
The anti-inflammatory lipid lipoxin A_{4} is an endogenous allosteric enhancer of the CB1 cannabinoid receptor. Lipoxin A_{4} enhances the affinity of anandamide at this receptor to exert cannabimimetic effects in the brain, by allosterically enhancing AEA signaling and thereby potentiating the effects of this endocannabinoid both in vitro and in vivo. In addition to this, LXA_{4} displays a CB1 receptor-dependent protective effect against β-amyloid-induced spatial memory impairment in mice.

=== Lipoxin analogs ===
Relatively stable, i.e. metabolically resistant, synthetic analogs of LXs and aspirin-triggered 15-epi-LXA_{4}s can mimic many of the desirable anti-inflammatory, "pro-resolution" actions of native LXs and are being tested for clinical use. Structurally, these LX analogs often mimic the LXs in being or closely resembling a 20-carbon trihydroxy fatty acid, but are resistant to 15-hydroxyprostaglandin dehydrogenase metabolic inactivation by having a bulky or other structural modification near their 15-hydroxy residues. For example, certain analogs simply alter an LX's structure by: replacing a hydrogen atom with a methyl residue at carbon 15 on LXA_{4} to form 15-methyl-LXA_{4}; changing the last 4 carbons of LXA_{4} or 15-epi-LXA_{4} to a 1-phenoxy residue or 1-phenoxy-4-fluoro residue to form 16-phenoxy-LX_{4}, 15-epi-15-phenoxy-LXA_{4}, 16-(para-fluoro-phenoxy-LXA_{4}, or 15-epi-16-(para-fluoro-phenoxy-LXA_{4}; and forming a bond between carbon 9 and carbon 14 of LXA_{4} to form an internal phenyl ring analog termed aromatic LXA_{4}; other, more complex structural analogs in development include 15-epi-LXA_{4} analogs termed ZK-142 and ZK994.

== Biological activity ==
=== Cellular studies ===
In the initial phases of many acute inflammatory responses, damaged tissues, invading pathogens, and other local events cause nearby cells to make and release arachidonic acid-derived pro-inflammatory metabolites such as: leukotrienes (LTs), e.g. LTB_{4}, LTC_{4}, LTD_{4}, and LTE_{4}; hydroxyeicosatetraenoic acids (HETEs), e.g. 5-HETE and 12-HETE; and oxoeicosanoids (oxo-ETE), e.g. 5-oxo-eicosatetraenoic acid (5-oxo-ETE) and 12-oxo-ETE. These metabolites proceed to act directly or indirectly to recruit circulating leukocytes, tissue macrophages, and tissue dendritic cells to the disturbed tissue site. The consequential congregation of the various cell types promotes transcellular pathways in forming specialized pro-resolving mediators (SPMs), including the LXs, which then proceed to stimulate cellular and tissue responses that trend to reverse the actions of the pro-inflammatory mediators, dampen and reverse the inflammatory response, and initiate tissue repair.

LXA_{4} and 15-epi-LXA_{4} are high-affinity receptor ligands for and activators of the FPR2 receptor. FPR2, which is now termed the ALX, ALX/FPR, or ALX/FPR2 receptor, is a G protein coupled receptor initially identified as a receptor for the leukocyte chemotactic factor, N-formylmethionine-leucyl-phenylalanine (FMLP), based on its amino acid sequence similarity to the known FMLP receptor, FPR1. At least six homologues of this receptor are found in mice. ALX/FPR is a promiscuous (i.e. interacting with diverse ligands) receptor that binds and is activated by other ligands including: a) various N-formyl oligopeptides that, like FMLP, are either released by microbes and mitochondria or are analogs of those released by microbes and mitochondria; b) microbe-derived non-formyl oligopeptides; c) certain polypeptides that are associated with the development of chronic amyloidosis and/or inflammation including serum amyloid A (SAA) proteins, a 42-amino acid peptide form amyloid beta termed Aβ42, humanin, and a cleaved soluble fragment (amino acids 274–388) from the urokinase receptor; and d) other SPMs including resolvins RvD1, RvD2, RvD5, AT-RvD1, and RvD3 (see Specialized pro-resolving mediators).

LXA_{4} and 15-epi-LXA_{4} inhibit chemotaxis, transmigration, superoxide generation, NF-κB activation, and/or generation of pro-inflammatory cytokines (e.g. IL8, IL13, IL12, and IL5) by neutrophils, eosinophils, monocytes, innate lymphoid cells, and/or macrophages, as well as suppress proliferation and production of IgM and IgG antibodies by B lymphocytes. These actions appear to involve stimulating anti-inflammatory signaling pathways, but also blocking the actions of other ALX/FPR ligands which simulate pro-inflammatory pathways. Transgenic mice made to overexpress ALX/FPR exhibit markedly reduced inflammatory responses to diverse insults. LXA_{4} and 15-epi-LXA_{4}, when introduced by intrathecal administration into rodents, suppress the perception of inflammatory pain; this action may involve the ALX/FPR receptor shown to be present on the spinal astrocytes of test animal and, based on studies using 15-epi-LXA, inhibition of the NALP1 inflammasome signaling complex.

By mechanisms yet to be clearly identified, the two LXs also: a) stimulate the bacteria-killing capacity of leukocytes and airway epithelial cells; b) block production of the pro-inflammatory cytokine, TNFα, while increasing production of the anti-inflammatory cytokine, CCR5 by T lymphocytes; c)' enhance the ability of monocytes and macrophages to phagocytos (i.e. ingest) and thereby remove potentially injurious apoptotic neutrophils and eosinophils from inflammatory sites (see Efferocytosis) either by direct effecting these cells or by stimulating NK cells to do so; d) cause various cell types to reduce production of pro-inflammatory reactive oxygen species and expression of cell adhesion molecules and increase production of the platelet inhibitor, PGI2 and the vasodilator, nitric oxide; e) inhibit production of pro-inflammatory cytokines by mesangial cells, fibroblasts, and other pro-inflammatory cell types; and f) reduce perception of pain due to inflammation.

LXA_{4} and 15-epi-LXA_{4} also act by mobilizing transcription factors that regulate expression of various inflammation-regulating genes. LXA_{4} stimulates various cell types to promote the entry of Nrf2 into the nucleus and thereby to increase the expression of genes such as heme oxygenase-1 (HMOX1), which increases production of the anti-inflammatory gaseous signaling agent, carbon monoxide, and genes involved in the synthesis of glutathione, a product which neutralizes oxidative stress and oxidant-induced tissue damage. Metabolically resistant structural analogs of LXB_{4} and 15-epi-LXA_{4} inhibit formation of peroxynitrite (i.e. ONOO^{−}) to attenuate the mobilization of NFκB and AP-1 transcription factors by reducing their accumulation in the nucleus of neutrophils, monocytes, and lymphocytes; NFκB and AP-1 increase expression of pro-inflammatory genes. The two LXBs also trigger activation of Suppressor of cytokine signaling proteins (see SOCS proteins) which, in turn, inhibit activation of STAT protein transcription factors which up-regulate many genes making pro-inflammatory products.

LXA_{4} and 15-epi-LXA_{4} are also high-affinity antagonists of the cysteinyl leukotriene receptor 1 for which leukotrienes (LT) LTC_{4}, LTD_{4}, and LTE_{4} are agonists, i.e. the three leukotrienes bind to and thereby stimulate smooth muscle contraction, eosinophil chemotactaxis, mucous gland secretion, and various other pro-allergic responses in the cells of lung, skin, and other tissues. (CysLT1 and ATX/FPR2 have an amino acid sequence identity of 47%.) The ability of these LXs to block the actions of the three LTs may contribute to their ability to resolve allergic reactions; for example, LXA4 relaxes the smooth muscle contraction caused by the cysteinyl leukotrienes in the hamster cheek pouch assay and a metabolically resistant 15-epi-LXAA_{4} analog potently inhibits allergen-driven airway hypersensitivity and inflammation in a mouse model.

At higher concentrations (>30 nmole/liter), LXA_{4} binds to AHR, the arylhydrocarbon receptor; following this binding, AHR enters the nucleus, where it joins with AhR nuclear translocator (ARNT). The AHR/ARNT complex binds to xenobiotic response elements to activate transcription of genes, most of which are involved primarily in xenobiotic metabolism. These genes include SOCS2 (i.e. suppressor of cytokine signaling 2), CYP1A1, CYP1A2, CYP1B1, glutathione S-transferase Ya subunit, quinone oxidoreductase, UDP-glucuronosyltransferase and aldehyde dehydrogenase 3 family, member A1. This LXA_{4} activity has been demonstrated only in murine cells.

LXA_{4} binds to and activates estrogen receptor alpha, with an IC50 of 46nM. LXA_{4} and ATLa were shown to activate transcriptional and functional (alkaline phosphatase and proliferation) responses via ERa in human endometrial epithelial cells in vitro and in mouse uterine tissue in vivo. Interestingly, LXA_{4} also demonstrated antiestrogenic potential, significantly attenuating E2-induced activity. In a mouse model of endometriosis physiologically relevant concentrations of ATLa caused a reduction in lesion size and impacted the production of inflammatory mediators. Molecules regulated via ERa were also impacted, implying that Lipoxin A_{4} and analogues, inhibiting both proliferative and inflammatory pathways, might be considered as potential therapeutics.

The actions of LXB_{4} and 15-epi-LXB_{4} have been far less well defined than those of their LXA_{4} analogs. Their mechanism of stimulating target cells (e.g. receptors) is not known. One or both of these analogs have been shown to inhibit the recruitment of neutrophils to sites of inflammation, inhibit the cytotoxicity of NK cells, stimulate the recruitment of monocytes to inflammatory sites, enhance macrophage phagocytosis, and suppress the perception of inflammatory pain in rodents.

=== Animal model studies ===
==== Noninfectious inflammation ====
One or more of the lipoxins or their analogs have been demonstrated to suppress, limit severity, and/or increase survival in multiple inflammatory and allergic diseases in mouse and rat model studies. These studies include models of experimentally evoked endometriosis, colitis, peritonitis, pancreatitis, kidney inflammation and glomerulonephritis, lung asthma, acid-induced lung injury, cystic fibrosis, pleurisy, brain inflammation and the inflammatory component of Alzheimer's disease, vascular ischemia-reperfusion injuries to various organs including the heart and hind limb, transplant rejection of heart, kidney, and bone marrow, arthritis, dermatitis, periodontitis, cornea inflammation, and inflammation-based pain, hyperalgesia, and diabetes/cardiovascular disease.

==== Infection-related inflammation ====
Lipoxins have protective effects in animal models of infection-based inflammation:

- LXA_{4} and a LXA_{4} analog decreased systemic inflammation and improved survival in rat models of gram-negative bacterial sepsis;
- 15-epi-LXA_{4} suppressed the lung injury (i.e., shock lung or acute respiratory distress syndrome) caused by intraperitoneal injection of Escherichia coli in mice;
- transgenic mice made deficient in lipoxin synthesis by deletion of their Alox5 gene were more susceptible to the inflammatory and lethal effects of Toxoplasma gondii and were rescued from these defects by LXA4_{4};
- LXA_{4} restored macrophage function caused by respiratory syncytial virus in transgenic mice made deficient of lipoxin synthesis by Alox5 gene deletion;
- LXA_{4} ameliorated infectious periodontitis in rabbit and porcine models;
- 15-epi-LXA_{4} decreased parasite blood levels, decrease cardiac inflammation, and increase survival in a mouse model of Trypanosoma cruzi-induced Chagas disease;
  - 15-epi-LXA_{4} prolonged survival in a mouse model of Plasmodium berghei-induced cerebral malaria; and
- LXA_{4} shortens the duration of the allergic response to the parasitic infestation, Angiostrongylus costaricensis.

However, lipoxins also produced harmful effects in these models: aerosol infection with Mycobacterium tuberculosis in transgenic mice defective in ALOX5, which contributes to LX synthesis, exhibited far less severe inflammation and better survival than control mice; and treatment of the transgenic mice with oral LXA_{4} reversed the protective effect of ALOX5 deletion.

=== Human studies ===
==== Preclinical studies ====
LXs and epi-LXs have been detected in various human tissues undergoing a wide range of inflammatory reactions, allergic reactions, and other conditions such as in the blood of patients undergoing coronary angioplasty or strenuous exercise. LXA_{4} inhibits the-bronchial contracting action of LTC4 and relaxes pre-contracted bronchi in asthmatic individuals.

Kaposi's sarcoma-associated herpesvirus (KSHV) causes the malignant transformation of human cells and is responsible for Kaposi's sarcoma and primary effusion lymphoma, two cancers which afflict in particular humans infected with HIV. Studies in human Kaposi sarcoma and primary effusion lymphoma cells find that:

- KSHV promotes the production of pro-inflammatory cytokines, lipoxygenases, cyclooxygenase, and metabolites of the latter two classes of enzymes while suppressing production of anti-inflammatory signaling agents such as LXA_{4}, apparently as a strategy to promote its latency and malignant transforming ability;
- Kaposi sarcoma and primary effusion lymphoma cells express the ALX/FPR receptor; and
- treatment of the latter cells with LXA_{4} or 15-epi-LXA_{4} reverses this pro-malignancy profile of pro-inflammatory signaling by an ALX/FPR-dependent mechanism.

These studies suggest that the two LXs or their analogs should be tested for possible use for treating the two malignancies.

==== Clinical studies ====
In a randomized controlled trial, topical application of 15-epi-LXA_{4} or a comparatively stable analog of LXB_{4}, 15R/S-methyl-LXB_{4}, reduced the severity of eczema in a study of 60 infants.

As of 2015, BLXA_{4}, a lipoxin analog, was undergoing a phase 1 clinical trial for treating oral gingivitis.

== See also ==
- Epi-lipoxins
- Specialized pro-resolving mediators
- 15-Hydroxyeicosatetraenoic acid
