= Maresin =

Maresin 1

Names
- Preferred IUPAC name (4Z,7R,8E,10E,12Z,14S,16Z,19Z)-7,14-Dihydroxydocosa-4,8,10,12,16,19-hexaenoic acid

Identifiers
CAS Number	1268720-28-0
3D model (JSmol)	Interactive image
ChEBI	CHEBI:138249
ChemSpider	29341935
PubChem CID	60201795
UNII	M82H7JW4HK
- InChI: InChI=1S/C22H32O4/c1-2-3-4-5-6-10-15-20(23)16-11-7-8-12-17-21(24)18-13-9-14-19-22(25)26/h3-4,6-13,16-17,20-21,23-24H,2,5,14-15,18-19H2,1H3,(H,25,26)/b4-3-,8-7+,10-6-,13-9-,16-11-,17-12+/t20-,21-/m0/s1 Key: HLHYXXBCQOUTGK-FHCQLJOMSA-N; InChI=1/C22H32O4/c1-2-3-4-5-6-10-15-20(23)16-11-7-8-12-17-21(24)18-13-9-14-19-22(25)26/h3-4,6-13,16-17,20-21,23-24H,2,5,14-15,18-19H2,1H3,(H,25,26)/b4-3-,8-7+,10-6-,13-9-,16-11-,17-12+/t20-,21-/m0/s1 Key: HLHYXXBCQOUTGK-FHCQLJOMBD
- SMILES: CC/C=C\C/C=C\C[C@@H](/C=C\C=C\C=C\[C@@H](C/C=C\CCC(=O)O)O)O

Properties
Chemical formula	C_{22}H_{32}O_{4}
Molar mass	360.494 g·mol^{−1}
- Except where otherwise noted, data are given for materials in their standard state (at 25 °C [77 °F], 100 kPa). Infobox references

Maresin 1 (MaR1 or 7R,14S-dihydroxy-4Z,8E,10E,12Z,16Z,19Z-docosahexaenoic acid) is a macrophage-derived mediator of inflammation resolution coined from macrophage mediator in resolving inflammation. Maresin 1, and more recently defined maresins, are 12-lipoxygenase-derived metabolites of the omega-3 fatty acid, docosahexaenoic acid (DHA), that possess potent anti-inflammatory, pro-resolving, protective, and pro-healing properties similar to a variety of other members of the specialized proresolving mediators (SPM) class of polyunsaturated fatty acid (PUFA) metabolites. SPM are dihydroxy, trihydroxy, and epoxy-hydroxy metabolites of long chain PUFA made by certain dioxygenase enzymes viz., cyclooxygenases and lipoxygenases. In addition to the maresins, this class of mediators includes: the 15-lipoxygenase (i.e. ALOX15 and/or possibly ALOX15B)-derived lipoxin A_{4} and B_{4} metabolites of the omega 6 fatty acid, arachidonic acid; the cyclooxygenase 2-derived resolvin E series metabolites of the omega 3 fatty acid, eicosapentaenoic acid; certain 15-lipoxygenase-derived resolvin D series metabolites of DHA; certain other 15-lipoxygenase-derived protectin D1 and related metabolites of DHA; and the more recently defined and therefore less fully studied 15-lipoxygenase-derived resolvin D_{n-3DPA} metabolites of the omega-3 fatty acid n-3 docosapentaenoic acid (n-3 DPA or clupanodonic acid), the cyclooxygenase 2-derived resolvin T metabolites of this clupanodonic acid, and the 15-lipoxygenase-derived products of the N-acetylated fatty acid amide of the DHA metabolite, docosahexaenoyl ethanolamide.

== Production ==
MaR1 was first defined as a product of DHA formed by cultures of human monocyte-derived macrophages. Studies implicate the following pathway in its formation: 12-lipoxygenase converts DHA to its 14-hydroxperoxy intermediate, 14(S)-hydroperoxy-4Z,7Z,10Z,12E,16Z,19Z-DHA (14-HpDHA); 14-HpDHA is converted enzymatically to its 13(S),14(S) epoxy derivative, termed 13(S),14(S)-epoxy-maresin which is then enzymatically hydrolyzed to MaR1. Byproducts of this metabolism include the reduction of 14-HpDHA to its hydroxyl counterpart, 14(S)-hydroxy-4Z,7Z,10Z,12E,16Z,19Z-DHA (14-HDHA); the 5-lipoxygenase-dependent conversion of 14-HpDHA and/or 14-HDHA to 7(S),14(S)-dihydroxy-4Z,8E,10Z,12E,15Z,19Z-DHA; and the non-enzymatic hydrolysis of 14-HpDHA to 7(S/R),14(S)-DHA and 13(S/R)-DHA products. Concurrently, the macrophages also convert DHA to 13(R),14(S)-dihydroxy-4Z,7Z,9E,11E,16Z,19Z-docosahexaenoic acid, i.e. maresin 2 (MaR2). The measurement of 17-HDHA in tissues is used as a marker for the level of activation of the maresin-producing pathway.

== Sources ==
The maresins have been detected primarily as products made by monocyte-macrophage cells types. MaR1 has been identified in the synovial fluid taken from the joints of patients with rheumatoid arthritis. In a murine model of acute respiratory distress syndrome, MaR1 production was detected; its generation appeared to reflect an interaction between blood platelets and neutrophils wherein 12-lipoxygenase-rich platelets generated 13(S),14(S)-epoxy-maresin which was then passed to neutrophils which hydrolyzed the epoxy maresin to MaR1. Planaria worms metabolize DHA to MaR1 during the healing phase of experimentally induced tissue injury.

== Activities ==
Studies suggest that maresins are involved in resolving inflammatory and allergic reactions, in wound healing, and in abating neuropathic pain.

MaR1 enhances the uptake (i.e. stimulates the efferocytosis) of apoptotic human neutrophils by human macrophages, stimulates macrophage phagocytosis, and limits the infiltration of neutrophils into the inflamed peritoneum of mice. In a murine model of acute respiratory distress syndrome, MaR1 generation was detected in a temporally regulated manner with early MaR1 production was dependent on platelet-neutrophil interactions; intravascular MaR1 was organ-protective, leading to decreased lung neutrophils, edema, tissue hypoxia, and prophlogistic mediators.

In a murine model of a self-limiting pulmonary allergic reaction, MaR1 reduced lung inflammation. It appeared to act at least in part by augmenting the generation of regulatory T cells which interacted with Group 2 innate lymphoid cells (i.e. helper T cell lymphocytes) to markedly suppress the production of two cytokines, interleukin-5 and interleukin-13, implicated in mediating allergic reactions. MaR1 accelerated tissue regeneration in experimentally injured planaria worms. In particular, it increasing the rate of head reappearance in beheaded worms. And, MaR1 reduced neuropathic pain in a mouse model by inhibiting a neuron ion channel, TRPV1, and thereby blocking capsaicin-induced inward currents and neuron excitation.

MaR2 possesses at least some of the activities ascribed to MaR1. It enhances human macrophage phagocytosis of particles and efferocytosis of apoptotic human neutrophils and reduces neutrophil infiltration into the inflamed peritoneum of mice. Its potencies in producing these responses are similar to those of MaR1.

13(S),14(S)-epoxy-maresin inhibits the production of the arachidonic acid metabolite, leukotriene B4 (LTB_{4}), by directly inactivating the enzyme, leukotriene-A4 hydrolase, which converts the LTB_{4} precursor, leukotriene A4, to LTB_{4}; this effect may contribute to the resolution of inflammatory responses by reducing the production of the proinflammatory mediator, LTB_{4}.

== Clinical relevancy ==
Studies find that the maresins inhibit certain pro-inflammatory functions in human neutrophils and macrophages in vitro, that MaR1 and Mar2 reduce the entry of blood neutrophils into the inflamed peritoneum in a mouse model, and that MaR1 promotes the resolution of allergic pulmonary inflammation in a mouse model as well as wound healing in planaria worm model. These studies have not yet translated to human physiology or pathology. It is noted that MaR1 is detectable in the synovial fluid of patients with rheumatoid arthritis. It is also noted that macrophages derived by culturing the monocytes isolated from the blood of patients with localized aggressive periodontitis have reduced levels of 12-lipoxygenase and MaR1 as well as reduced phagocytosis and killing of the periodontal pathogenic bacteria, Porphyromonas gingivalis and Aggregatibacter actinomycetemcomitans; the latter functional defects were improved by treating the cells with MaR1. MaR1 also reduced inflammation in a mouse model of multiple sclerosis.

Further studies are needed to determine if maresins play a functional role in resolving inflammation, promoting wound healing, or limiting neuropathic pain and/or if maresins or their metabolism-resistant analogs are clinically useful in treating the latter conditions.
