= Docosanoid =

Biologically active class of organic compounds

In biochemistry, docosanoids are signaling molecules made by the metabolism of twenty-two-carbon fatty acids (EFAs), especially the omega-3 fatty acid, docosahexaenoic acid (DHA) (i.e. 4Z,7Z,10Z,13Z,16Z,19Z-docosahexaenoic acid) by lipoxygenase, cyclooxygenase, and cytochrome P450 enzymes. Other docosanoids are metabolites of n-3 docosapentaenoic acid (DPA) (i.e. 7Z,10Z,13Z,16Z,19Z-docosapentaenoic acid, or clupanodonic acid), n-6 DPA (i.e. 4Z,7Z,10Z,13Z,16Z-docosapentaenoic acid, or osbond acid), and docosatetraenoic acid (i.e. 7Z,10Z,13Z,16Z-docosatetraenoic acid, DTA, or adrenic acid). Prominent docosanoid metabolites of DPA and n-3 DHA are members of the specialized pro-resolving mediators class of polyunsaturated fatty acid metabolites that possess potent anti-inflammation, tissue healing, and other activities.

== Prominent docosanoids ==
=== Specialized proresolving mediator docosanoids ===
Potently bioactive agents of the specialized proresolving mediator class include:

- DHA-derived resolvins (Rvs) of the D series: RvD1, RvD2, RvD3, RvD4, RvD5, RvD6, AT-RvD1, AT-RvD2, AT-RvD3, AT-RvD4, AT-RvD5, and AT-RvD6.
- n-3 DPA-derived resolvins of the D series (RvD1_{n-3}, RvD2_{n-3}, and RvD5_{n-3}) and the T series (RvT1, RvT2, RvT3, and RvT4).
- DHA-derived neuroprotectins, also termed protectins: PD1, PDX, 17-epi-PD1, and 10-epi-PD1.
- n-3 DPA derived protectins: PD1_{n-3} and PD2_{n-3}.
- DHA-derived maresins: MaR1, MaR2, 7-epi-Mar1, Mar-L1, and Mar-L2.
- n-3 DPA-derived maresins: Mar1_{n-3}, Mar2_{n-3}, and Mar3_{n-3}.

These DHA metabolites possess anti-inflammation and tissue-protection activities in animal models of inflammatory diseases; they are proposed to inhibit innate immune responses and thereby to protect from and to resolve a wide range of inflammatory responses in animals and humans. These metabolites are also proposed to contribute to the anti-inflammatory and other beneficial effects of dietary omega-3 fatty acids by being metabolized to them.

=== Neurofuran docosanoids ===
DHA can be converted non-enzymatically by free radical-mediated peroxidation to 8 different neurofuran regioisomers termed neuroprostanes and neurofuranes including 4-, 7-, 10-, 11-, 13-, 14-, 17-, and 20-series neurofurans/neuroporstanes for a total of 128 different racemic compounds. The most studied DHA-derived of these products are members of the 4-series, neurofuran 4-F_{α}neuroprostane and 4(RS)-ST-Δ6-8-neurofurane. These metabolites have been used mainly as biomarkers of oxidative stress that are formed in nerve tissues of the central nervous system.

=== Hydroxy-docosanoids ===
Cells metabolize DHA to 17S-hydroperoxy-4Z,7Z,10Z,13Z,15E,19Z-docosahexaenoic acid (17-HpDHA) and then rapidly reduce this hydroperoxide to 17S-hydroxy-4Z,7Z,10Z,13Z,15E,19Z-docosahexaenoic acid (17-HDHA) and similarly metabolize DHA to 13S-hydroperoxy-4Z,7Z,10Z,14Z,16Z,19Z-docosahexaenoic acid (13-HpDHA) and then to 13S-hydroxy-4Z,7Z,10Z,14Z,16Z,19Z-docosahexaenoic acid (13-HDHA). 17-HDHA exhibits potent in vitro as well as in vivo (animal model) anti-inflammatory activity while 17-HpDHA and to a lesser extent 17-HDHA inhibit the growth of cultured human breast cancer cells. Other SPM docosanoids, e.g. RvD1 and RvD2, have anti-growth effects against cancer cells in animal models.

=== Oxo-docosanoids ===
Cells can metabolize DHA to products that possess an oxo (i.e. ketone) residue. These products include 13-oxo-DHA (termed EFOXD6) and 17-oxo-DHA (termed 18-EFOXD6). Both oxo metabolites possess anti-inflammatory activity as assesses in in-vitro systems (see Specialized proresolving mediators § Oxo-DHA and oxo-DPA metabolites).

=== DTA-derived docosanoids ===
Cyclooxygenase and cytochrome P450 oxidase act upon docosatetraenoic acid to produce dihomoprostaglandins, dihomo-epoxyeicosatrienoic acids, and dihomo-EETs.
