= Poxytrin =

Fatty acid isomers that inhibit platelet activity

Poxytrins or dihydroxy-E,Z,E-polyunsaturated fatty acids (dihydroxy-E,Z,E-PUFAs) are PUFA metabolites that possess two hydroxyl residues and three in-series conjugated double bonds in an E,Z,E cis–trans configuration. Poxytrins have platelet-inhibiting properties that are not found in isomers with three conjugated double bonds presenting in a different geometry. The unique E,Z,E configuration in poxytrins may prove to be relevant in treating human conditions and diseases that involve pathological platelet activation.

== Types ==
Poxytrins are metabolites of docosahexaenoic acid (DHA), arachidonic acid (AA), and α-linolenic acid (ALA). Poxytrins derived from AA are termed linotrins.

Trivial name	Formula	Precursor
protectin DX (PDX)	10R,17S-dihydroxy-4Z,7Z,11E,13Z,15E,19Z-docosahexaenoic acid	DHA
10R,17S-diHDHA	10R,17S-dihydroxy-4Z,7Z,11E,13Z,15E,19Z-docosahexaenoic acid	DHA
10S,17S-diHDHA	10S,17S-dihydroxy-4Z,7Z,11E,13Z,15E,19Z-docosahexaenoic acid	DHA
7-epi-MaR1	7S,14S-dihydroxy-4Z,8E,10Z,12E,16Z,19Z-docosahexaenoic acid	DHA
8S,15S-diHETE	8S,15S-dihydroxy-5Z,9E,11Z,13E-eicosatetraenoic acid	AA
linotrin-1	9R,16S-dihydroxy-10E,12Z,14E-octadecatrienoic acid	ALA
linotrin-2	9S,16S-dihydroxy-10E,12Z,14E-octadecatrienoic acid	ALA

=== PDX ===
Protectin DX (PDX) is perhaps the most prominent poxytrin. It is not to be confused with its isomer protectin D1 (PD1). PD1 is structurally identical to PDX except that its three conjugated double bonds 11E,13E,15Z have the E,E,Z configuration. PDX and PD1 both possess potent specialized pro-resolving mediator (SPM) anti-inflammatory activity, but only PDX inhibits human platelet aggregation responses. PDX's anti-platelet activity is shared with various other dihydroxy-E,Z,E-PUFAs, but not with dihydroxy-PUFAs that have an E,E,E or E,E,Z configuration.

Cells make PDX by metabolizing DHA by double oxygenation with a 15-lipoxygenase to form the 10R,17S-hydroxperoxy intermediate which is reduced to its 10R,17S-hydroxyl product, PDX, probably by cytosolic glutathione peroxidase 1 (GPX1). Serial metabolism by two different lipoxygenases or by a lipoxygenase and a cytochrome P45 on a 1Z,4Z,7Z-PUFA may also make a 1,7-dihydroxy 2E,4Z,6E product.

=== Other poxytrins ===
- 10R,17S-diHDHA is the 10R diastereomer of PDX, with the 10R hydroxyl residue being formed by aspirin-treated COX-2 or a cytochrome P450.
- 8S,15S-diHETE has been observed in guinea pig tissues, probably made through double oxygenation of AA by a 15-lipoxygenase (probably ALOX15) or serial metabolism by two enzymes.
- 10S,17S-diHDHA is the 13Z cis–trans isomer of 10-epi-protectin D (which has a 13E double bond instead). 10S,17S-diHDHA is formed in vitro by stimulated human leukocytes and possesses SPM anti-inflammatory activity.
- 7-epi-MaR1 is a maresin isomer1, and likewise possesses SPM activity.

=== Linotrins ===
Linotrin-1 and linotrin-2 are among the four isomeric metabolites produced by incubating ALA with ALOX15B. The extent to which the linotrins form in cells or in vitro is not clear.

== Activity ==
Stimulating agents such as collagen depend on platelets to make and release thromboxane A_{2} (TXA_{2}) to mediate and/or enhance their aggregating activity. 10R,17S-diHDHA, and PDX to a slightly lesser degree, inhibit the human platelet aggregation response to collagen at ≥ 100–200 nanomolar concentrations. This appears to reflect the ability of poxytrins to inhibit the activities of COX-1 and COX-2, thereby blocking the production of TXA_{2} and thus interfering with the activation of the thromboxane receptor by TXA_{2}. The linotrins appear to use a similar mechanism, and to have similar or slightly lower potencies. However, the linotrins are 20- to 100-fold stronger in inhibiting human platelet aggregation compared to 5-HETE and 12-HETE, two mono-hydroxyl-containing eicosanoids that contain an E,Z conjugated double bond configuration. Other biologically-active poxytrins have yet to be tested for, but are projected to possess anti-platelet activity.
