= Epi-lipoxin =

Class of chemical compounds

Chemical structure of 15-epi-lipoxin A4 (15-epi-LxA4)

Epi-lipoxins are trihydroxy (i.e. containing 3 hydroxyl residues) metabolites of arachidonic acid. They are 15R-epimers of their lipoxin counterparts; that is, the epi-lipoxins, 15-epi-lipoxin A4 (15-epi-LxA4) and 15-epi-lipoxin B4 (15-epi-LXB4), differ from their respective lipoxin A4 (LxA4) and lipoxin B4 (LxB4) epimers in that their 15-hydroxy residue has R rather than S chirality. Formulae for these lipoxins (Lx) are:

- LxA4: 5S,6R,15S-trihydroxy-7E,9E,11Z,13E-eicosatetraenoic acid
- LxB4: 5S,14R,15S-trihydroxy-6E,8Z,10E,12E-eicosatetraenoic acid
- 15-epi-LxA4: 5S,6R,15R-trihydroxy-7E,9E,11Z,13E-eicosatetraenoic acid
- 15-epi-LxB4: 5S,14R,15R-trihydroxy-6E,8Z,10E,12E-eicosatetraenoic acid

The two-epi-Lx's as well as the two lx's are nonclassic eicosanoids that, like other members of the specialized pro-resolving mediators class of autocoids, form during and act to resolve inflammatory responses. Synthesis of the lipoxins typically involves a lipoxygenase enzyme which acts to add a 15S-hydroxyl residue to the lipoxin precursor, arachidonic acid, whereas synthesis of the epi-lipoxins involves aspirin-pretreated cyclooxygenase 2 or a cytochrome P450 enzyme which adds a 15R-hydroxyl residue to arachidonic acid. In acknowledgement of the role played by aspirin-treated cyclooxygenase 2 in forming these products, the epi-lipoxins are sometimes termed ATL which stands for Aspirin-Triggered Lipoxins.

The counter-regulatory role of the epi-lipoxins in serving as stop signals for diverse inflammation responses is detailed at the lipoxin site.

== See also ==
- Lipoxins
- Specialized pro-resolving mediators
