= ALOX15 =

Lipoxygenase found in humans

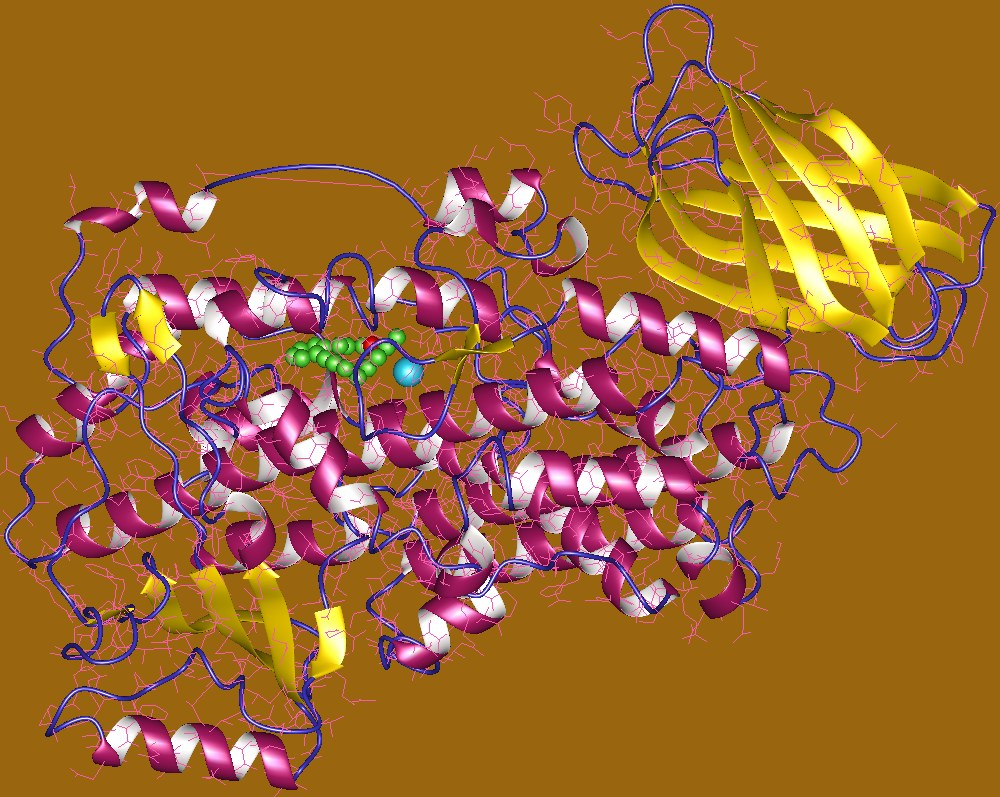
- The arachidonate 15-lipoxygenase of the European rabbit

Identifiers
- Aliases: ALOX15, 12-LOX, arachidonate 15-lipoxygenase, LOG15, 15-LOX-1, 15LOX-1, 15-LOX
- External IDs: OMIM: 152392; MGI: 87997; GeneCards: ALOX15
Enzyme activity
EC #	BRENDA	ExPASy	KEGG	MetaCyc
1.13.11.12	↗	↗	↗	↗
1.13.11.31	↗	↗	↗	↗
1.13.11.33	↗	↗	↗	↗

Gene location (Human)
Chr.	Chromosome 17 (human)
Band	17p13.2	Start	4,630,919 bp
Band	17p13.2	End	4,642,294 bp

Gene location (Mouse)
Chr.	Chromosome 11 (mouse)
Band	11 B3|11 42.99 cM	Start	70,234,978 bp
Band	11 B3|11 42.99 cM	End	70,242,857 bp
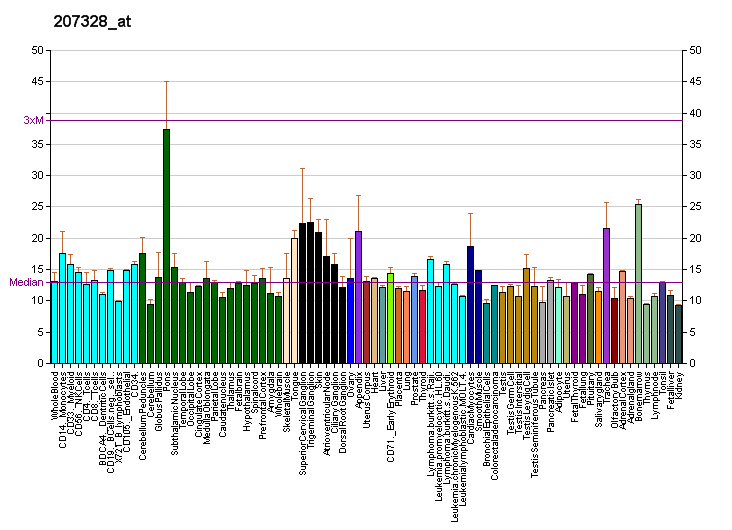
RNA expression pattern
Bgee	Human / Mouse (ortholog); Top expressed in: olfactory zone of nasal mucosa; bronchial epithelial cell; nasal epithelium; oocyte; mucosa of paranasal sinus; secondary oocyte; right uterine tube; trachea; testicle; right lung / Top expressed in: olfactory system; olfactory epithelium; tibiofemoral joint; embryo; embryo; cervix; blood; corneal stroma; lens; hematopoietic cell; More reference expression data
BioGPS	More reference expression data
Gene ontology
Molecular function	hepoxilin A3 synthase activity; iron ion binding; eoxin A4 synthase activity; dioxygenase activity; hepoxilin-epoxide hydrolase activity; metal ion binding; protein binding; oxidoreductase activity; phosphatidylinositol-4,5-bisphosphate binding; oxidoreductase activity, acting on single donors with incorporation of molecular oxygen, incorporation of two atoms of oxygen; lipid binding; arachidonate 15-lipoxygenase activity; arachidonate 12(S)-lipoxygenase activity
Cellular component	cytoplasm; cytosol; membrane; extrinsic component of cytoplasmic side of plasma membrane; lipid droplet; plasma membrane
Biological process	cellular response to calcium ion; bone mineralization; leukotriene metabolic process; positive regulation of heterotypic cell-cell adhesion; positive regulation of actin filament polymerization; negative regulation of adaptive immune response; ossification; lipoxin A4 biosynthetic process; lipid metabolism; wound healing; phosphatidylethanolamine biosynthetic process; regulation of peroxisome proliferator activated receptor signaling pathway; response to endoplasmic reticulum stress; fatty acid metabolic process; apoptotic cell clearance; lipoxygenase pathway; hepoxilin biosynthetic process; regulation of engulfment of apoptotic cell; positive regulation of ERK1 and ERK2 cascade; inflammatory response; cellular response to interleukin-13; positive regulation of cell-substrate adhesion; arachidonic acid metabolic process; cytokine-mediated signaling pathway; long-chain fatty acid biosynthetic process
Sources:Amigo / QuickGO
Orthologs
Databases	NCBI: entry; OMA: entry
Species	Human	Mouse
Entrez	246	11687
Ensembl	ENSG00000161905	ENSMUSG00000018924
UniProt	P16050	P39654
RefSeq (mRNA)	NM_001140	NM_009660
RefSeq (protein)	NP_001131	NP_033790
Location (UCSC)	Chr 17: 4.63 – 4.64 Mb	Chr 11: 70.23 – 70.24 Mb
PubMed search
- Wikidata
View/Edit Human	View/Edit Mouse

ALOX15 (also termed arachidonate 15-lipoxygenase, 15-lipoxygenase-1, 15-LO-1, 15-LOX-1) is, like other lipoxygenases, a seminal enzyme in the metabolism of polyunsaturated fatty acids to a wide range of physiologically and pathologically important products. ▼ Gene Function

Kelavkar and Badr (1999) stated that the ALOX15 gene product is implicated in antiinflammation, membrane remodeling, and cancer development/metastasis. Kelavkar and Badr (1999) described experiments yielding data that supported the hypothesis that loss of the TP53 gene, or gain-of-function activities resulting from the expression of its mutant forms, regulates ALOX15 promoter activity in human and in mouse, albeit in directionally opposite manners. These studies defined a direct link between ALOX15 gene activity and an established tumor-suppressor gene located in close chromosomal proximity. Kelavkar and Badr (1999) referred to this as evidence that 15-lipoxygenase is a mutator gene. ▼ Mapping

By PCR analysis of a human-hamster somatic hybrid DNA panel, Funk et al. (1992) demonstrated that genes for 12-lipoxygenase and 15-lipoxygenase are located on human chromosome 17, whereas the most unrelated lipoxygenase (5-lipoxygenase) was mapped to chromosome 10.

Kelavkar and Badr (1999) stated that the ALOX15 gene maps to 17p13.3 in close proximity to the tumor-suppressor gene TP53 (191170). In humans, it is encoded by the ALOX15 gene located on chromosome 17p13.3. This 11 kilobase pair gene consists of 14 exons and 13 introns coding for a 75 kilodalton protein composed of 662 amino acids. 15-LO is to be distinguished from another human 15-lipoxygenase enzyme, ALOX15B (also termed 15-lipoxygenase-2). Orthologs of ALOX15, termed Alox15, are widely distributed in animal and plant species but commonly have different enzyme activities and make somewhat different products than ALOX15.

== Nomenclature ==
Human ALOX15 was initially named arachidonate 15-lipoxygenase or 15-lipoxygenase, but subsequent studies uncovered a second human enzyme with 15-lipoxygenase activity as well as various non-human mammalian Alox15 enzymes that are closely related to and therefore orthologs of human ALOX15. Many of the latter Alox15 enzymes nonetheless possess predominantly or exclusively 12-lipoxygenase rather than 15-lipoxygenase activity. Consequently, human ALOX15 is now referred to as arachidonate-15-lipoxygenase-1, 15-lipoxygenase-1, 15-LOX-1, 15-LO-1, human 12/15-lipoxygenase, leukocyte-type arachidonate 12-lipoxygenase, or arachidonate omega–6 lipoxygenase. The second discovered human 15-lipoxygenase, a product of the ALOX15B gene, is termed ALOX15B, arachidonate 15-lipoxygenase 2, 15-lipoxygenase-2, 15-LOX-2, 15-LO-2, arachidonate 15-lipoxygenase type II, arachidonate 15-lipoxygenase, second type, and arachidonate 15-lipoxygenase; and mouse, rat, and rabbit rodent orthologs of human ALOX15, which share 74-81% amino acid identity with the human enzyme, are commonly termed Alox15, 12/15-lipoxygenase, 12/15-LOX, or 12/15-LO).

Both human ALOX15 and ALOX15B genes are located on chromosome 17; their product proteins have an amino acid sequence identity of only ~38%; they also differ in the polyunsaturated fatty acids that they prefer as substrates and exhibit different product profiles when acting on the same substrates.

== Tissue distribution ==
Human ALOX15 protein is highly expressed in circulating blood eosinophils and reticulocytes, cells, bronchial airway epithelial cells, mammary epithelial cells, the Reed–Sternberg cells of Hodgkin's lymphoma, corneal epithelial cells, and dendritic cells; it is less strongly expressed in alveolar macrophages, tissue mast cells, tissue fibroblasts, circulating blood neutrophils, vascular endothelial cells, joint synovial membrane cells, seminal fluid, prostate epithelium cells, and mammary ductal epithelial cells.

The distribution of Alox15 in sub-human primates and, in particular, rodents differs significantly from that of human ALOX15; this, along with their different principal product formation (e.g. 12-HETE rather than 15-HETE) has made the findings of Alox15 functions in rat, mouse, or rabbit models difficult to extrapolate to the function of ALOX15 in humans.

== Enzyme activities ==
=== Lipoxygenase activity ===
ALOX15 and Alox15 enzymes are non-heme, iron-containing dioxygenases. They commonly catalyze the attachment of molecular oxygen O_{2} as a peroxy residue to polyunsaturated fatty acids (PUFA) that contain two carbon–carbon double bonds that for the human ALOX15 are located between carbons 10 and 9 and 7 and 6 as numbered counting backward from the last or omega (i.e. ω) carbon at the methyl end of the PUFA (these carbons are also termed ω–10 and ω–9 and ω–7 and ω–6). In PUFAs that do not have a third carbon–carbon double bond between their ω–13 and ω–12 carbons, human ALOX15 forms ω–6 peroxy intermediates; in PUFAs that do have this third double bond, human ALOX15 makes the ω–6 peroxy intermediate but also small amounts of the ω–9 peroxy intermediate. Rodent Alox15 enzymes, in contrast, produce almost exclusively ω–9 peroxy intermediates. Concurrently, ALOX15 and rodent Alox15 enzymes rearrange the carbon–carbon double bonds to bring them into the 1S-hydroxy-2E,4Z-diene configuration. ALOX15 and Alox15 enzymes act with a high degree of stereospecificity to form products that position the hydroperoxy residue in the S stereoisomer configuration.

=== Lipohydroperoxidase activity ===
Human ALOX15 can also convert the peroxy PUFA intermediate to a cyclic ether with a three-atom ring, i.e. an epoxide intermediate that is attacked by a water molecule to form epoxy-hydroxy PUFA products. Eoxins stimulate vascular permeability in an ex vivo human vascular endothelial model system.

=== Leukotriene synthase activity ===
The PUFA epoxide of arachidonic acid made by ALOX15 - eoxin A4 may also be conjugated with glutathione to form eoxin B4 which product can be further metabolized to eoxin C4, and eoxin D4.

== Substrates, substrate metabolites, and metabolite activities ==
Among their physiological substrates, human and rodent ALOX15 enzymes act on linoleic acid, alpha-linolenic acid, gamma-linolenic acid, arachidonic acid, eicosapentaenoic acid, and docosahexaenoic acid when presented not only as free acids but also when incorporated as esters in phospholipids, glycerides, or cholesteryl esters. The human enzyme is particularly active on linoleic acid, preferring it over arachidonic acid. It is less active on PUFA that are esters within the cited lipids.

=== Arachidonic acid ===
Arachidonic acid

Arachidonic acid (AA) has double bonds between carbons 5-6, 8-9, 11-12, and 14-15; these double bonds are in a cis or Z configuration rather than a trans or E configuration. ALOX15 adds a hydroperoxy residue to AA at carbons 15 and to a lesser extent 12 to form 15(S)-hydroperoxy-5Z,8Z,11Z,13E-eicosatetraenoic acid (15(S)-HpETE) and 12(S)-hydroperoxy-5Z,8Z,10E,14Z-eicosatetraenoic acid (12(S)-HpETE); the purified enzyme makes 15(S)-HpETE and 12(S)-HpETE in a product ratio of ~4-9 to 1. Both products may be rapidly reduced by ubiquitous cellular glutathione peroxidase enzymes to their corresponding hydroxy analogs, 15(S)-HETE and 12(S)-HETE. 15(S)-HpETE and 15(S)-HETE bind to and activate the leukotriene B4 receptor 2, activate the peroxisome proliferator-activated receptor gamma, and at high concentrations cause cells to generate toxic reactive oxygen species; one or more of these effects may be at least in part responsible for their ability to promote inflammatory responses, alter the growth of various times of human cancer cell lines, contract various types of blood vessels, and stimulate pathological fibrosis in pulmonary arteries and liver (see 15-Hydroxyeicosatetraenoic acid § 15(S)-HpETE and 15(S)-HETE). 15(S)-HpETE and 15(S)-HETE are esterified into membrane phospholipids where they may be stored and subsequently released during cell stimulation. As one aspect of this processing, the two products are progressively esterified in mitochondria membrane phospholipids during the maturation of red blood cells and thereby may serve to signal for the degradation of the mitochondria and the maturation of these precursors to red blood cells in mice. This pathway operates along with two other mitochondria-removing pathways and therefore does not appear essential for mouse red blood cell maturation.

15-(S)-HpETE and 15(S)-HETE may be further metabolized to various bioactive products including:

- Lipoxin (LX)A4, LXB4, AT-LXA4, and AT-LXB4; these metabolites are members of the specialized pro-resolving mediator class of anti-inflammatory agents that contribute to the resolution of inflammatory responses and inflammation-based diseases in animal models and, potentially, humans.
- Hepoxilin isomers (e.g. 11S-hydroxy-14S,15S-epoxy-5Z,8Z,12E-eicosatrienoic acid (14,15-HxA3) and 13R-hydroxy-14S,15S-epoxy-5Z,8Z,11Z-eicosatrienoic acid (14,15-HxB3)) which may contribute to the regulation of inflammation responses and insulin secretion.
- Eoxins (e.g. eoxin C4, 14,15-eoxin D4, and eoxin E4) which have pro-inflammatory actions and contribute to severe asthma, aspirin-exacerbated respiratory disease attacks, and other allergy reactions; they may also be involved in the pathology of Hodgkins disease.
- Poxytrin 8(S),15(S)-dihydroxy-5Z,9E,11Z,13E-eicosatetraenoic acid (8(S),15(S)-diHETE), an inhibitor of human platelet aggregation.
- 5(S),15(S)-Dihydroxy-6Z,8E,11E,13Z-eicosatetraenoic acid (5(S),15(S)-diHETE) and its 5-ketone analog, 5-oxo-15(S)-hydroxy-ETE. These are weak and potent, respectively, stimulators of human eosinophil, neutrophil, and monocyte chemotaxis and thereby possible contributors to human allergic and non-allergic inflammation responses (see 5-Hydroxyeicosatetraenoic acid §§ Inflammation and Allergy).
- 15-Oxo-ETE which inhibits the growth of cultured human umbilical vein endothelial cells and various human cancer cell lines; it is also has activities on THP1 cell line cells suggesting that it might act as an inhibitor of inflammatory and oxidative stress reactions (see 15-Hydroxyeicosatetraenoic acid § 15-Oxo-ETE).

The minor products of ALOX15, 12-(S)-HpETE and 12(S)-HETE, possess a broad range of activities. One or both of these compounds stimulates cells by binding with and activating two G protein-coupled receptors, GPR31 and the leukotriene B4 receptor 2; 12(S)-HETE also acts as a receptor antagonist by binding to but not stimulating the thromboxane receptor thereby inhibiting the actions of thromboxane A2 and prostaglandin H2 (see 12-Hydroxyeicosatetraenoic acid § Receptor targets and mechanisms of action). As at least a partial consequence of these receptor-directed actions, one or both the two ALOX15 products exhibit pro-inflammation, diabetes-inducing, and vasodilation activities in animal models; cancer-promoting activity on cultured human cancer cells; and other actions (see 12-Hydroxyeicosatetraenoic acid § Activities and possible clinical significance). The two products are also further metabolized to various bioactive products including:

- Hepoxilin A3 and Hepoxilin B3 along with their respective tri-hydroxyl metabolites, trioxilin A3 and trioxilin B3. These metabolites have been reported to have anti-inflammatory activity, to have vasodilation activity, to promote pain perception, to reverse oxidative stress in cells, and to promote insulin secretion in animal model systems (see Hepoxilin).
- 12-Oxo-ETE, which along with 12(S)-HETE, activates the leukotriene B4 receptor, leukotriene B4 receptor 2 (BLT2) but not its leukotriene B4 receptor 1 (BLT1). This allows the possibility that 12-oxo-ETE contributes to the pro-inflammatory and other activities that BLT2 regulates (see 12-Hydroxyeicosatetraenoic acid § Inflammation and inflammatory diseases and Leukotriene B4 receptor 2).

=== Docosahexaenoic acid ===
Human ALOX15 metabolizes docosahexaenoic acid (DHA) to 17S-Hydroperoxy-4Z,7Z,10Z,13Z,15E,19Z-docosahexaenoic acid (17S-HpDHA) and 17S-hydroxy-4Z,7Z,10Z,13Z,15E,19Z-docosahexaenoic acid (17S-HDHA). One or both of these products stimulate human breast and prostate cell lines to proliferate in culture and 17S-HDHA possesses potent specialized proresolving mediator activity (see Specialized proresolving mediators § DHA-derived resolvins). One or both of these products may be further metabolized enzymatically to:

- Resolvin Ds (RvDs), i.e. RvD-1, RvD2, RvD3, RvD4, RvD5, RvD6, and protectin Ds (PDs), i.e. PD1, PDX, 20-hydroxy-PD1, 17-epi-PD1, and 10-epi-PD1 (see Neuroprotectin D1 and Specialized proresolving mediators § DHA-derived protectins/neuroprotectins). These products are members of, and have a wide range of activities common to, the specialized proresolving mediators class of metabolites.

=== Eicosapentaenoic acid ===
Human ALOX15 metabolizes eicosapentaenoic acid to 15S-hydroperoxy-5Z,8Z,11Z,13E,17E-eicosapentaenoic acid (15S-HpEPA) and 15S-hydroxy-5Z,8Z,11Z,13E,17E-eicosapentaenoic acid (15S-HEPA); 15S-HEPA inhibits ALOX5-dependent production of the pro-inflammatory mediator, LTB4, in cells, and may thereby serve an anti-inflammatory function. These products may be further metabolized to:

- Resolvin E3, a specialized proresolvin mediator with anti-inflammatory activity (see Specialized proresolving mediators § EPA-derived resolvins i.e. RvE).

=== n-3 Docosapentaenoic acid ===
Human cells and mouse tissues metabolize n-3 docosapentaenoic acid (i.e., 7Z,10Z,13Z,16Z,19Z-docosapentaenoic acid, or clupanodonic acid) to a series of products that have been classified as specialized proresolvin mediators. Base on the analogy to docosahexaenoic acid metabolism to resolving D's, it is presumed that a 15-lipoxygenase, most likely ALOX15 in humans, contributes to this metabolism. These products, termed n-3 Resolven D's (RvD_{n-3}'s), are:

- RvD1_{n-3}, RvD2_{n-3}, and RvD3_{n-3}; each of these products possesses potent anti-inflammatory activity (see Specialized proresolving mediators § n-3 DPA-derived resolvins).

=== Linoleic acid ===
Human 15-LOX-1 prefers linoleic acid over arachidonic acid as its primary substrate, oxygenating it at carbon 13 to form 13(S)-hydroperoxy-9Z,11E-octadecenoic acid (13-HpODE or 13(S)-HpODE) which may then be reduce to the corresponding hydroxy derivative, 13(S)-HODE or 13-HODE (see 13-Hydroxyoctadecadienoic acid). In addition to 13(S)-HpODE, non-human 15-LOX1 orthologs such as mouse 12/15-LOX and soybean 15-LOX metabolize linoleic acid to 9-hydroperoxy-10E, 12Z-octadecenoic acid (9-HpODE or 9(S)-HpODE), which is rapidly converted to 9(S)-HODE (9-HODE) (see 9-Hydroxyoctadecadienoic acid). 13(S)-HODE acts through peroxisome proliferator-activated receptors and the TRPV1 and human GPR132 receptors to stimulate a variety of responses related to monocyte maturation, lipid metabolism, and neuron activation (see 13-Hydroxyoctadecadienoic acid § Activities); 9(S)-HODE is a marker for diseases involving oxidative stress and may contribute to this disease as well as to pain perception and atherosclerosis (see 9-Hydroxyoctadecadienoic acid § Biological and clinical relevancy of 9-HODEs). The two HODEs can be further metabolized to their ketones, 13-oxo-9Z,11E-octadecenoic acid and 9-oxo-10E, 12Z-octadecenoic acid; these ketones have been implicated as biomarkers for and possible contributors to the inflammatory component of atherosclerosis, Alzheimer's disease, steatohepatitis, and other pathological conditions.

=== Dihomo-γ-linolenic acid ===
Human neutrophils, presumably using their ALOX 15, metabolize dihomo-γ-linolenic acid (8Z,11Z,14Z-eicosatrienoic acid) to 15S-hydroperoxy-8Z,11Z,13E-eicosatrienoic acid and 15S-hydroxy-8Z,11Z,13E-eicosatrienoic acid (15S-HETrE). 15S-HETrE possesses anti-inflammatory activity.

== Gene manipulation studies ==
Mice made deficient in their 12/15-lipoxygenase gene (Alox15) exhibit a prolonged inflammatory response along with various other aspects of a pathologically enhanced inflammatory response in experimental models of cornea injury, airway inflammation, and peritonitis. These mice also show an accelerated rate of progression of atherosclerosis whereas mice made to overexpress 12/15-lipoxygenase exhibit a delayed rate of atherosclerosis development. Alox15 overexpressing rabbits exhibited reduced tissue destruction and bone loss in a model of periodontitis. Finally, Control mice, but not 12/15-lipoxygense deficient mice responded to eicospentaenoic acid administration by decreasing the number of lesions in a model of endometriosis. These studies indicate that the suppression of inflammation is a major function of 12/15-lipoxygenase and the Specialized proresolving mediators it produces in rodents; although rodent 12/15-lipoxygenase differs from human ALOX15 in the profile of the PUFA metabolites that it produces as well as various other parameters (e.g. tissue distribution), these genetic studies allow that human ALOX15 and the specialized proresolving mediators it produces may play a similar major anti-inflammatory function in humans.

== Clinical significance ==
=== Inflammatory diseases ===
A huge and growing number of studies in animal models suggest that 15-LOX-1 and its lipoxin, resolvin, and protectin metabolites (see Specialized proresolving mediators) to inhibit, limit, and resolve diverse inflammatory diseases including periodontitis, peritonitis, sepsis, and other pathogen-induced inflammatory responses; in eczema, arthritis, asthma, cystic fibrosis, atherosclerosis, and adipose tissue inflammation; in the insulin resistance that occurs in obesity that is associated with diabetes and the metabolic syndrome; and in Alzheimer's disease. While these studies have not yet been shown to translate to human diseases, first and second generation synthetic resolvins and lipoxins, which unlike their natural analogs, are relatively resistant to metabolic inactivation, have been made and tested as inflammation inhibitors in animal models. These synthetic analogs may prove to be clinically useful for treating the cited human inflammatory diseases.

By metabolizing the ω-3 polyunsaturated fatty acids, eicosapentaenoic acid and docosahexaenoic acid, into 17-HpDHA, 17-HDHA, and the resolvins and protectins, 15-LOX-1's metabolic action is thought to be one mechanism by which dietary ω-3 polyunsaturated fatty acids, particularly fish oil, act to ameliorate inflammation, inflammation-related diseases, and certain cancers.

=== Asthma ===
15-LOX-1 and its 5-oxo-15-hydroxy-ETE and eoxin metabolites have been suggested as potential contributors to, and therefore targets for the future study and treatment of, human allergen-induced asthma, aspirin-induced asthma, and perhaps other allergic diseases.

=== Cancer ===
In colorectal, breast, and kidney cancers, 15-LOX-1 levels are low or absent compared to the cancers' normal tissue counterparts and/or these levels sharply decline as the cancers progress. These results, as well as a 15-LOX-1 transgene study on colon cancer in mice suggests but do not prove that 15-LOX-1 is a tumor suppressor.

By metabolizing ω-3 polyunsaturated fatty acids, eicosapentaenoic acid and docosahexaenoic acid, into lipoxins and resolvins, 15-LOX-1 is thought to be one mechanism by which dietary ω-3 polyunsaturated fatty acids, particularly fish oil, may act to reduce the incidence and/or progression of certain cancers. Indeed, the ability of docosahexaenoic acid to inhibit the growth of cultured human prostate cancer cells is totally dependent upon the expression of 15-LOX-1 by these cells and appears due to this enzyme's production of docosahexaenoic acid metabolites such as 17(S)-HpETE, 17(S)-HETE, and/or and, possibly, an isomer of protectin DX (10S,17S-dihydroxy-4Z,7Z,11E,13Z,15E,19Z-docosahexaenoic acid)

Kelavkar et.al have shown that aberrant overexpression of 15-LO-1 occurs in human PCa, particularly high-grade PCa, and in high-grade prostatic intraepithelial neoplasia (HGPIN), and that the murine orthologue is increased in SV40-based genetically engineered mouse (GEM) models of PCa, such as LADY and TRansgenic Adenocarcinoma of Mouse Prostate. Targeted overexpression of h15-LO-1 (a gene overexpressed in human PCa and HGPIN) to mouse prostate is sufficient to promote epithelial proliferation and mPIN development. These results support 15-LO-1 as having a role in prostate tumor initiation and as an early target for dietary or other prevention strategies. The FLiMP mouse model should also be useful in crosses with other GEM models to further define the combinations of molecular alterations necessary for PCa progression.

== Inhibitors ==
ALOX15 inhibitors include the following:

- Baicalein
- CU-13001
- i472
- KNX-100 (synthetic oxytocin-like compound 1; SOC-1)
- KNX-101
- Luteolin
- ML351
- SKL-11197 (SKL-NP)
- Utreloxastat (EPI-857; PTC-857)
- Vatiquinone (α-tocotrienol quinone; EPI-743; PTC-743; vincerenone)

== See also ==
- 15-Hydroxyicosatetraenoic acid
- 12-Hydroxyeicosatetraenoic acid
