= Specialized pro-resolving mediators =

Cellular molecules that help resolve inflammation

Specialized pro-resolving mediators (SPM, also spelled specialized proresolving mediators) are a large and growing class of cell signaling molecules formed in cells by the metabolism of polyunsaturated fatty acids (PUFA) by one or a combination of lipoxygenase, cyclooxygenase, and cytochrome P450 monooxygenase enzymes. Pre-clinical studies, primarily in animal models and human tissues, implicate SPM in orchestrating the resolution of inflammation. Prominent members include the resolvins and protectins.

SPM join the long list of other physiological agents which tend to limit inflammation (see Inflammation § Resolution) including glucocorticoids, interleukin 10 (an anti-inflammatory cytokine), interleukin 1 receptor antagonist (an inhibitor of the action of the pro-inflammatory cytokine, interleukin 1), annexin A1 (an inhibitor of formation of pro-inflammatory metabolites of PUFAs, and the gaseous resolvins), carbon monoxide (see Carbon monoxide § Physiology), nitric oxide (see Nitric oxide § Biological functions), and hydrogen sulfide (see Hydrogen sulfide §§ Biosynthesis and Signalling role).

The absolute, as well as relative roles, of the SPM along with other physiological anti-inflammatory agents in resolving human inflammatory responses remain to be defined precisely. Studies suggest that synthetic SPM that are resistant to being metabolically inactivated hold promise of being clinically useful pharmacological tools for preventing and resolving a wide range of pathological inflammatory responses along with the tissue destruction and morbidity that these responses cause. Based on animal model studies, the inflammation-based diseases which may be treated by such metabolically resistant SPM analogs include not only pathological and tissue-damaging responses to invading pathogens but also a wide array of pathological conditions in which inflammation is a contributing factor such as allergic inflammatory diseases (e.g. asthma, rhinitis), autoimmune diseases (e.g. rheumatoid arthritis, systemic lupus erythematosus), psoriasis, atherosclerosis disease leading to heart attacks and strokes, type 1 and type 2 diabetes, the metabolic syndrome, and certain dementia syndromes (e.g. Alzheimer's disease, Huntington's disease).

Many of the SPM are metabolites of omega−3 fatty acids and have been proposed to be responsible for the anti-inflammatory actions that are attributed to diets rich in omega−3 fatty acids.

== History ==
Through most of its early period of study, acute inflammatory responses were regarded as self-limiting innate immune system reactions to invading foreign organisms, tissue injuries, and other insults. These reactions were orchestrated by various soluble signaling agents such as a) foreign organism-derived N-formylated oligopeptide chemotactic factors (e.g. N-formylmethionine-leucyl-phenylalanine); b) complement components C5a and C3a which are chemotactic factors formed during the activation of the host's blood complement system by invading organisms or injured tissues; and c) host cell-derived pro-inflammatory cytokines (e.g. interleukin 1s), host-derived pro-inflammatory chemokines (e.g. CXCL8, CCL2, CCL3, CCL4, CCL5, CCL11, CXCL10), platelet-activating factor, and PUFA metabolites including in particular leukotrienes (e.g. LTB4), hydroxyeicosatetraenoic acids (e.g., 5-HETE, 12-HETE), the hydroxylated heptadecatrienoic acid, 12-HHT, and oxoeicosanoids (e.g. 5-oxo-ETE). These agents functioned as pro-inflammatory signals by increasing the permeability of local blood vessels; activating tissue-bound pro-inflammatory cells such as mast cells, and macrophages; and attracting to nascent inflammatory sites and activating circulating neutrophils, monocytes, eosinophils, gamma delta T cells, and natural killer T cells. The cited cells then proceeded to neutralize invading organisms, limit tissue injury, and initiate tissue repair. Hence, the classic inflammatory response was viewed as fully regulated by the soluble signaling agents. That is, the agents formed, orchestrated an inflammatory cell response, but then dissipated to allow resolution of the response. In 1974, however, Charles N. Serhan, Mats Hamberg and Bengt Samuelsson, discovered that human neutrophils metabolize arachidonic acid to two novel products that contain 3 hydroxyl residues and 4 double bonds viz., 5,6,15-trihydroxy-7,9,11,13-icosatetraenoic acid and 5,14,15-trihydroxy-6,8,10,12-icosatetraenoic acid. These products are now termed lipoxin A4 and B4, respectively. While initially found to have in vitro activity suggesting that they might act as pro-inflammatory agents, Serhan and colleagues and other groups found that the lipoxins as well as a large number of newly discovered metabolites of other PUFA possess primarily if not exclusively anti-inflammatory activities and therefore may be crucial for causing the resolution of inflammation. In this view, inflammatory responses are not self-limiting but rather limited by the formation of a particular group of PUFA metabolites that counteract the actions of pro-inflammatory signals. Later, these PUFA metabolites were classified together and termed specialized pro-resolving mediators (i.e. SPM).

== Inflammation ==
The production and activities of the SPM suggest a new view of inflammation wherein the initial response to foreign organisms, tissue injury, or other insults involves numerous soluble cell signaling molecules that not only recruit various cell types to promote inflammation but concurrently cause these cells to produce SPM which feed back on their parent and other cells to dampen their pro-inflammatory activity and to promote repair. Resolution of an inflammatory response is thus an active rather than self-limiting process which is set into motion at least in part by the initiating pro-inflammatory mediators (e.g. prostaglandin E2 and prostaglandin D2) which instruct relevant cells to produce SPM and to assume a more anti-inflammatory phenotype. Resolution of the normal inflammatory response, then, may involve switching production of pro-inflammatory to anti-inflammatory PUFA metabolites. Excessive inflammatory responses to insult as well as many pathological inflammatory responses that contribute to diverse diseases such as atherosclerosis, obesity, diabetes, Alzheimer's disease, inflammatory bowel disease, etc. (see Inflammation § Disorders) may reflect, in part, a failure in this class switching. Diseases caused or worsened by non-adaptive inflammatory responses may by amenable to treatment with SPM or synthetic SPM which, unlike natural SPM, resist in vivo metabolic inactivation. The SPM possess overlapping activities which work to resolve inflammation. SPMs (typically more than one for each listed action) have the following anti-inflammatory activities on the indicated cell types as defined in animal and human model studies:

- Neutrophils: inhibit their migration from the blood circulation into inflamed tissues and their release of tissue-injuring reactive oxygen species and granule-bound enzymes; stimulates their expression the chemokine receptor, CCR5, to inhibit chemokine signaling, enhances their phagocyte activity, and promotes their death by apoptosis.
- Eosinophils: inhibit their migration from the blood circulation into inflamed tissues.
- Monocytes: inhibit their migration response to chemotactic factors and release of pro-inflammatory mediators.
- Lymphocytes: Inhibit the infiltration of CD4+ and CD8+ lymphocytes into inflamed sites and inhibits production of the pro-inflammatory signals, interleukin-4 and interferon gamma by CD4+ lymphocytes; promotes the apoptosis of Th-17 pro-inflammatory lymphocytes; promotes B cell lymphocytes to differentiate into antibody secreting cells; inhibits innate lymphoid cells from releasing pro-inflammatory cytokines such as interleukin-13 while stimulating them to secrete amphiregulin, a product which acts to restore mucosal integrity; Inhibits the production of the pro-inflammatory cytokines, interleukin-17 and interleukin-23, thereby contributing to the dampening adaptive immune responses in T helper 17 cells; stimulates natural killer T cell lymphocytes to induce apoptosis in the neutrophils and eosinophil of inflamed tissues; and increases the cytotoxicity of the natural killer cell type of lymphocytes by, e.g. promoting their ability to induce apoptosis in neutrophils and eosinophils in inflamed tissues.
- Platelets: inhibit their aggregation and possibly thereby their contribution to blood clotting.
- Macrophages: inhibit their infiltration into inflamed tissues and release of pro-inflammatory cytokines; stimulate their conversion from a pro-inflammatory M1 phenotype to an anti-inflammatory M2 phenotype (see Macrophage § Subtypes) that are more active in secreting the anti-inflammatory cytokine, Interleukin-10, more resistant to become apoptotic, and more active in leaving sites of inflammation.
- Microglia cells: inhibit the release of pro-inflammatory cytokines by this central nervous system type of macrophage.
- Mast cells: inhibit their infiltration into inflamed tissues and, in lung mast cells, the release of histamine.
- Dendritic cells: suppresses their migration to lymph nodes as well as their release of pro-inflammatory cytokines and expression of MHC class II proteins.
- Neurons: act through their target G protein–coupled receptors to inhibit pain receptors (i.e. TRPV1, TRPV3, TRPV4, TRPA1, TNFR, NMDAR, and/or mGluR) on neurons in the peripheral nervous system, dorsal root ganglia, and/or spinal cord thereby suppressing pain perception.

SPMs also stimulate anti-inflammatory and tissue reparative types of responses in epithelium cells, endothelium cells, fibroblasts, smooth muscle cells, osteoclasts, osteoblasts, goblet cells, and kidney podocytes as well as activate the heme oxygenase system of cells thereby increasing the production of the tissue-protective gaso-transmitter, carbon monoxide (see Carbon monoxide § Physiology), in inflamed tissues.

== Biochemistry ==
SPM are metabolites of arachidonic acid (AA), eicosapentaenoic acid (EPA), docosahexaenoic acid (DHA), or n−3 DPA (i.e. 7Z,10Z,13Z,16Z,19Z-docosapentaenoic acid or clupanodonic acid); these metabolites are termed lipoxins (Lx), resolvins (Rv), protectins (PD) (also termed neuroprotectins [NP]), and maresins (MaR). EPA, DHA, and n−3 DPA are n−3 fatty acids; their conversions to SPM are proposed to be one mechanism by which n−3 fatty acids may ameliorate inflammatory diseases (see Omega−3 fatty acid § Inflammation). SPM act, at least in part, by either activating or inhibiting cells through binding to and thereby activating or inhibiting the activation of specific cellular receptors.

=== Lipoxins ===
Human cells synthesize LxA4 and LxB4 by serially metabolizing arachidonic acid (5Z,8Z,11Z,14Z-eicosatetraenoic acid) with a) ALOX15 (or possibly ALOX15B) followed by ALOX5; b) ALOX5 followed by ALOX15 (or possibly ALOX15B); or c) ALOX5 followed by ALOX12. Cells and, indeed, humans treated with aspirin form the 15R-hydroxy epimer lipoxins of these two 15S-lipoxins viz., 15-epi-LXA4 and 15-epi-LXB4, through a pathway that involves ALOX5 followed by aspirin-treated cyclooxygenase-2 (COX-2). Aspirin-treated COX-2, while inactive in metabolizing arachidonic acid to prostanoids, metabolizes this PUFA to 15R-hydroperoxy-eicosatetraenoic acid whereas the ALOX15 (or ALOX15B) pathway metabolizes arachidonic acid to 15S-hydroperoxy-eicosatetraenoic acid. The two aspirin-triggered lipoxins (AT-lipoxins) or epi-lipoxins differ structurally from LxA4 and LxB4 only in the S versus R chirality of their 15-hydroxyl residue. Numerous studies have found that these metabolites have potent anti-inflammatory activity in vitro and in animal models and in humans may stimulate cells by binding to certain receptors on these cells. The following table lists the structural formulae (ETE stands for eicosatetraenoic acid), major activities, and cellular receptor targets (where known).

Trivial name	Formula	Activities	Receptor(s)
LxA4	5S,6R,15S-trihydroxy-7E,9E,11Z,13E-ETE	Anti-inflammatory, blocks pain perception	Stimulates FPR2, AHR
LxB4	5S,14R,15S-trihydroxy-6E,8Z,10E,12E-ETE	Anti-inflammatory, blocks pain perception	?
15-epi-LxA4 (or AT-LxA4)	5S,6R,15R-trihydroxy-7E,9E,11Z,13E-ETE	Anti-inflammatory, blocks pain perception	stimulates FPR2
15-epi-LxB4 (or AT-LxB4)	5S,14R,15R-trihydroxy-6E,8Z,10E,12E-ETE	Anti-inflammatory, blocks pain perception	?

- The FPL2 receptor (also termed the ALX, ALX/FPR2 receptor) is expressed on human neutrophils, eosinophils, monocytes, macrophages, T cells, synovial fibroblasts, and intestinal and airway epithelium as well as on astrocytes in the spinal cord of mice; GPR32 (also termed the RvD1 receptor or DRV1)is expressed on human neutrophils, lymphocytes, monocytes, macrophages, and vascular tissue. Both of these receptors are involved in regulating inflammation. The AHR (i.e. the aryl hydrocarbon receptor) is a ligand-activated transcription factor that regulates xenobiotic-metabolizing enzymes such as cytochrome P450 enzymes.

=== Resolvins ===
Resolvins are metabolites of omega−3 fatty acids, EPA, DHA, and 7Z,10Z,13Z,16Z,19Z-docosapentaenoic acid (n−3 DPA). All three of these omega−3 fatty acids are abundant in salt water fish, fish oils, and other seafood. n−3 DPA (also termed clupanodonic acid) is to be distinguished from its n−6 DPA isomer, i.e. 4Z,7Z,10Z,13Z,16Z-docosapentaenoic acid, also termed osbond acid.

==== EPA-derived resolvins ====
Cells metabolize EPA (5Z,8Z,11Z,14Z,17Z-eicosapentaenoic acid) by a cytochrome P450 monooxygenase(s) (in infected tissues a bacterial cytochrome P450 may supply this activity) or aspirin-treated cyclooxygenase-2 to 18R-hydroperoxy-EPA which is then reduced to 18R-hydroxy-EPA and further metabolized by ALOX5 to 5S-hydroperoxy-18R-hydroxy-EPA; the later product may be reduced to its 5,18-dihydroxy product, RvE2, or converted to its 5,6-epoxide and then acted on by an epoxide hydrolase to form a 5,12,18-trihydroxy derivative, RvE1. In vitro, ALOX5 can convert 18S-HETE to the 18S analog of RvE1 termed 18S-RvE1. 18R-HETE or 18S-HETE may also be metabolized by ALOX15 to its 17S-hydroperoxy and then reduced to its 17S-hydroxy product, Rv3. Rv3, as detected in in vitro studies, is a dihydroxy mixture of 18S-dihydroxy (i.e. 18S-RvE3) and 18R-dihydroxy (i.e. 18R-RvE3) isomers, both of which, similar to the other aforementioned metabolites possess potent SPM activity in in vitro and/or animal models. In vitro studies find that ALOX5 can convert 18S-hydroperoxy-EPA to the 18S-hydroxy analog of RvE2 termed 18S-RvE2. 18S-RvE2, however has little or no SPM activity and is therefore not considered to be a SPM here. The following table lists the structural formulae (EPA stands for eicosapentaenoic acid), major activities, and cellular receptor targets (where known).

Trivial name	Formula	Activities	Receptor(s)
RvE1	5S,12R,18R-trihydroxy-6Z,8E,10E,14Z,16E-EPA	Anti-inflammatory, blocks pain perception	stimulates CMKLR1, receptor antagonist of BLT, inhibits activation of TRPV1, TRPV3, NMDAR, and TNFR receptors
18S-RvE1	5S,12R,18S-trihydroxy-6Z,8E,10E,14Z,16E-EPA	Anti-inflammatory, blocks pain perception	stimulates CMKLR1, receptor antagonist of BLT
RvE2	5S,18R-dihydroxy-6E,8Z,11Z,14Z,16E-EPA	Anti-inflammatory	partial receptor agonist of CMKLR1, receptor antagonist of BLT
RvE3	17R,18R/S-dihydroxy-5Z,8Z,11Z,13E,15E-EPA	Anti-inflammatory	?

- CMKLR1 (chemokine receptor-like 1), also termed the ChemR23 or E series resolvin receptor (ERV), is expressed on inflammation-regulating NK cells, macrophages, dendritic cells, and innate lymphoid cells as well as on epithelial cells and in brain, kidney, cardiovascular, gastrointestinal, and myeloid tissues; BLT is the receptor for LTB4 along with certain other pro-inflammatory agents and is expressed on human neutrophils, eosinophils, monocytes, macrophages, T cells, mast cells, and dendritic cells as well as in vascular tissue; GPR32 (also termed the RvD1 receptor or DRV1) is expressed on human inflammation-regulating neutrophils, lymphocytes, monocytes, macrophages, and vascular tissue. TRPV1 and TRPV3 are expressed on neurons and supporting cells, principally of the peripheral nervous system, that are involved in the sensory perception of pain; the NMDA receptor is a glutamate receptor and ion channel protein involved in controlling synaptic plasticity and memory.

==== DHA-derived resolvins ====
Cells metabolize DHA (4Z,7Z,10Z,13Z,16Z,19Z-docosahexaenoic acid) by either ALOX15 or a cytochrome P450 monooxygenase(s) (bacteria may supply the cytochrome P450 activity in infected tissues) or aspirin-treated cyclooxygenase-2 to 17S-hydroperoxy-DHA which is reduced to 17S-hydroxy-DHA. ALOX5 metabolizes this intermediate to a) 7S-hydroperoxy,17S-hydroxy-DHA which is then reduced to its 7S,17S-dihydroxy analog, RvD5; b) 4S-hydroperoxy,17S-hydroxy-DHA which is reduced to its 4S,17S-dihydroxy analog, RvD6; c) 7S,8S-epoxy-17S-DHA which is then hydrolyzed to 7,8,17-trihydroxy and 7,16,17-trihydorxy products, RvD1 and RvD2, respectively; and d) 4S,5S-epoxy-17S-DHA which is then hydrolyzed to 4,11,17-trihydroxy and 4,5,17-trihydroxy products, RvD3 and RvD4, respectively. These six RvDs possess a 17S-hydroxy residue; however, if aspirin-treated cyclooxygenase-2 is the initiating enzyme, they contain a 17R-hydroxy residue and are termed 17R-RvDs, aspirin-triggered-RvDs, or AT-RvDs 1 thru 6. In certain cases, the final structures of these AT-RvDs is assumed by analogy to the structures of their RvD counterparts. Studies have found that most (and presumably all) of these metabolites have potent anti-inflammatory activity in vitro and/or in animal models. The following table lists the structural formulae, major activities with citations and cellular receptor targets of D series resolvins.

Trivial name	Formula	Activities	Receptor(s)
RvD1	7S,8R,17S-trihydroxy-4Z,9E,11E,13Z,15E,19Z-DHA	Anti-inflammatory, blocks pain perception	stimulates GPR32, FPR2, inhibits activation of TRPV3, TRPV4, TRPA1
RvD2	7S,16R,17S-trihydroxy-4Z,8E,10Z,12E,14E,19Z-DHA	Anti-inflammatory, blocks pain perception, increases survival after sepsis	stimulates GPR32, GPR18, FPR2, inhibits activation of TRPV1 and TRPA1
RvD3	4S,11R,17S-trihydroxy-5Z,7E,9E,13Z,15E,19Z-DHA	Anti-inflammatory	stimulates GPR32
RvD4	4S,5R,17S-trihydroxy-6E,8E,10Z,13Z,15E,19Z-DHA	?	?
RvD5	7S,17S-dihydroxy-4Z,8E,10Z,13Z,15E,19Z-DHA	Anti-inflammatory	stimulates GPR32
RvD6	4S,17S-dihydroxy-5E,7Z,10Z,13Z,15E,19Z-DHA	?	?
17R-RvD1 (AT-RvD1)	7S,8R,17R-trihydroxy-4Z,9E,11E,13Z,15E,19Z-DHA	Anti-inflammatory, blocks pain perception	stimulates FPR2, GPR32, inhibits activation of TRPV3, TRPV4, and TNFR
17R-RvD2 (AT-RvD2)	7S,16R,17R-trihydroxy-4Z,8E,10Z,12E,14E,19Z-DHA	?	?
17R-RvD3 (AT-RvD3)	4S,11R,17R-trihydroxy-5Z,7E,9E,13Z,15E,19Z-DHA	Anti-inflammatory	stimulates GPR32
17R-RvD4 (AT-RvD4)	4S,5R,17R-trihydroxy-6E,8E,10Z,13Z,15E,19Z-DHA	?	?
17R-RvD5 (AT-RvD5)	7S,17R-dihydroxy-4Z,8E,10Z,13Z,15E,19Z-DHA	?	?
17R-RvD6 (AT-RvD6)	4S,17R-dihydroxy-5E,7Z,10Z,13Z,15E,19Z-DHA	?	?

- The distribution and major functions of GPR32, FPR2, TRPV1, and TRPV3 are given in the above EPA-derived resolvins section; TRPA1 is a chemosensor ion channel located on the plasma membrane of many human cell types; TRPV4, also termed the vanilloid-receptor related osmotically activated channel (VR-OAC) and OSM9-like transient receptor potential channel member 4 (OTRPC4)2], is involved in multiple physiologic functions and dysfunctions. With respect to the SPMS, both receptors mediate the perception of various forms of inflammation-triggered pain.
- The initial product of 15-lipoxygenase attack on DHA is 17S-hydroperoxy-4Z,7Z,10Z,13Z,15E,19Z-docosahexaenoic acid (17-HpDHA) which may then be rapidly reduced by a cellular glutathione peroxidase to 17S-hydroxy-4Z,7Z,10Z,13Z,15E,19Z-docosahexaenoic acid (17-HDHA). 17-HDHA has potent anti-inflammatory activity and has been classified as a SPM although not a resolvin. Similarly, 14S,20R-dihyrdoxy-4Z,7Z,10Z,12E,16Z,18E-docosahexaenoic acid, while not yet assigned a RvD number, qualifies as a RvD-related SPM. It is a DHA metabolite made by mouse eosinophils, detected in the peritoneal fluid of mice undergoing experimental peritonitis, and possessing the ability to inhibit the influx of leukocytes into the peritoneum of the mice. Finally, two resolvin sulfido-conjugates (8-glutathionyl,7,17-dihydroxy-4Z,9,11,13Z,15E,19Z-docosahexaenoic acid and 8-cysteinylglycinyl,7,17-dihydroxy-4Z,9,11,13Z,15E,19Z-docosahexaenoic acid) have been shown to be formed from their 7,17-dihydroxy precursor by cells in vitro, to accelerate regeneration of experimental injuries in planaria worms, and to have potent anti-inflammatory activity in various in vitro model systems.

==== n−3 DPA-derived resolvins ====
n−3 DPA (i.e. 7Z,10Z,13Z,16Z,19Z-docosapentaenoic acid)-derived resolvins are recently identified SPM. In the model system used to identify them, human platelets pretreated with aspirin to form acetylated COX-2 or with the statin, atorvastatin, to form S-nitrosylated COX-2, thereby modify this enzyme's activity. The modified enzyme metabolizes n−3 DPA to a 13R-hydroperoxy-n−3 DPA intermediate which is passed over to nearby human neutrophils; these cells then metabolize the intermediate to four poly-hydroxyl metabolites termed resolvin T1 (RvT1), RvT2, RvT3, and RvT4. These T series resolvins also form in mice undergoing experimental inflammatory responses and have potent in vitro and in vivo anti-inflammatory activity; they are particularly effective in reducing the systemic inflammation as well as increasing the survival of mice injected with lethal doses of E. coli bacteria. Another set of newly described n−3 DPA resolvins, RvD1_{n−3}, RvD2_{n−3}, and RvD5_{n−3}, have been named based on their presumed structural analogies to the DHA-derived resolvins RvD1, RvD2, and RvD5, respectively. These three n−3 DPA-derived resolvins have not been defined with respect to the chirality of their hydroxyl residues or the cis–trans isomerism of their double bonds but do possess potent anti-inflammatory activity in animal models and human cells; they also have protective actions in increasing the survival of mice subjected to E. coli sepsis. The following table lists the structural formulae (DPA stands for docosapentaenoic acid), major activities and cellular receptor targets (where known).

Trivial name	Formula	Activities	Receptor(s)
RvT1	7S,13R,20S-trihydroxy-8E,10Z,14E,16Z,18E-DPA	Anti-inflammatory	?
RvT2	7S,12R,13S-trihydroxy-8Z,10E,14E,16Z,19Z-DPA	Anti-inflammatory	?
RvT3	7S,8R,13S-trihydroxy-9E,11E,14E,16Z,19Z-DPA	Anti-inflammatory	?
RvT4	7S,13R-dihydroxy-8E,10Z,14E,16Z,19Z-DPA	Anti-inflammatory	?
RvD1_{n−3}	7S,8R,17S-trihydroxy-9E,11E,13Z,15E,19Z-DPA	Anti-inflammatory	?
RvD2_{n−3}	7S,16R,17S-trihydroxy-8E,10Z,12E,14E,19Z-DPA	Anti-inflammatory	?
RvD5_{n−3}	7S,17S-dihydroxy-8E,10Z,13Z,15E,19Z-DPA	Anti-inflammatory	GPR101

=== Protectins/neuroprotectins ===
==== DHA-derived protectins/neuroprotectins ====
Cells metabolize DHA by either ALOX15, by a bacterial or mammalian cytochrome P450 monooxygenase (Cyp1a1, Cyp1a2, or Cyp1b1 in mice; see CYP450 §§ CYP families in humans and P450s in other species) or by aspirin-treated cyclooxygenase-2 to 17S-hydroperoxy or 17R-hydroperoxy intermediates (see previous subsection); this intermediate is then converted to a 16S,17S-epoxide which is then hydrolyzed (probably by a soluble epoxide hydrolase to protectin D1 (PD1, also termed neuroprotectin D1 [NPD1] when formed in neural tissue). PDX is formed by the metabolism of DHA by two serial lipoxygenases, probably a 15-lipoxygenase and ALOX12. 22-Hydroxy-PD1 (also termed 22-hydroxy-NPD1) is formed by the omega oxidation of PD1 probably by an unidentified cytochrome P450 enzyme. While omega-oxidation products of most bioactive PUFA metabolites are far weaker than their precursors, 22-hydroxy-PD1 is as potent as PD1 in inflammatory assays. Aspirin-triggered-PD1 (AT-PD1 or AP-NPD1) is the 17R-hydroxyl diastereomer of PD1 formed by the initial metabolism of DHA by aspirin-treated COX-2 or possibly a cytochrome P450 enzyme to 17R-hydroxy-DHA and its subsequent metabolism possibly in manner similar to that which forms PD1. 10-Epi-PD1 (ent-AT-NPD1), the 10S-hydroxy diastereomer of PD1, has been detected in small amounts in human neutrophils. While its in vivo synthetic pathway has not been defined, 10-epi-PD1 has anti-inflammatory activity. The following table lists the structural formulae (DHA stands for docosahexaenoic acid), major activities, cellular receptor targets (where known), and Wikipedia pages giving further information on the activity and syntheses.

Trivial name	Formula	Activities	Receptor(s)	See Wikipedia pages
PD1 (NPD1)	10R,17S-dihydroxy-4Z,7Z,11E,13E,15Z,19Z-DHA	anti-inflammatory, nerve protection/regeneration, blocks pain perception	inhibits the activation of TRPV1	Neuroprotectin D1
PDX	10S,17S-dihydroxy-4Z,7Z,11E,13Z,15E,19Z-DHA	anti-inflammatory, inhibits platelet activation	?	Neuroprotectin D1 § Protectin DX and Dihydroxy-E,Z,E-PUFA
22-hydroxy-PD1	10R,17S,22-trihydroxy-4Z,7Z,11E,13E,15Z,19Z-DHA	anti-inflammatory	?	Neuroprotectin D1 § Protectin DX and Dihydroxy-E,Z,E-PUFA
17-epi-PD1 (AT-PD1)	10R,17R-dihydroxy-4Z,7Z,11E,13E,15Z,19Z-DHA	anti-inflammatory	?	Neuroprotectin D1 § Aspirin-triggered PD1
10-epi-PD1 (ent-AT-NPD1)	10S,17S-dihydroxy-4Z,7Z,11E,13E,15Z,19Z-DHA	anti-inflammatory	?	Neuroprotectin D1 § 10-epi-PD1

- The TRPV1 receptor is discussed in the EPA-derived resolvin section.
- While not yet given trivial names, certain isomers of the protectins also prove to have SPM activity: the 13Z cis–trans isomer of 10-epi-PD1, 10S,17S-dihydroxy-4Z,7Z,11E,13Z,15E,19Z-DHA, is a relatively abundant metabolite compared to PD1 detected in the peritoneal fluid from a mouse model of peritonitis (although not detected in stimulated leukocytes) and has moderately potent anti-inflammatory activity in this model; 10R,17S-dihydroxy-4Z,7Z,11E,13E,15E,19Z-DHA, is a prominent metabolite detected in stimulated leukocytes, not detected the mouse peritonitis model, and has modest anti-inflammatory activity in the latter model; and 10S,17S-dihydroxy-4Z,7Z,11E,13E,15Z,19Z-DHA, while not detected by in the mouse model of peritonitis or stimulated leukocytes, is more potent than even PD1 in inhibiting peritonitis in the mouse model. In addition to these compounds, two protectin sulfido-conjugates (16-glutathionyl,17-hydroxy-4Z,7Z,10,12,14,19Z-docosahexaenoic acid and 16-cysteinylglycinyl,17-hydroxy-4Z,7Z,10,12,14,19Z-docosahexaenoic acid) form in vitro, accelerate regeneration of injured planaria worms, and have potent anti-inflammatory activity in in vitro model systems.

==== n−3 DPA-derived protectins/neuroprotectins ====
n−3 DPA-derived protectins with structural similarities to PD1 and PD2 have been described, determined to be formed in vitro and in animal models, and termed PD1_{n−3} and PD2_{n−3}, respectively. These products are presumed to be formed in mammals by the metabolism of n−3 DPA by an unidentified 15-lipoxygenase activity to 16,17-epoxide intermediate and the subsequent conversion of this intermediate to the di-hydroxyl products PD1_{n−3} and PD2_{n−3}. PD1_{n−3} has anti-inflammatory activity in a mouse model of peritonitis; PD2_{n−3} has anti-inflammatory activity in an in vitro model. The following table lists the structural formulae (DPA stands for docosapentaenoic acid), major activities and cellular receptor targets (where known).

Trivial name	Formula	Activities	Receptor(s)
PD1_{n−3}	10,17-dihydroxy-7,11,13,15,19-DPA	anti-inflammatory	?
PD2_{n−3}	16,17-dihydroxy-7,10,12,14,19-DPA	anti-inflammatory	?

=== Maresins ===
==== DHA-derived maresins ====
Cells metabolize DHA by ALOX12, other lipoxygenase, (12/15-lipoxygenase in mice), or an unidentified pathway to a 13S,14S-epoxide-4Z,7Z,9E,11E,16Z,19Z-DHA intermediate (13S,14S-epoxy-maresin MaR) and then hydrolyze this intermediate by an epoxide hydrolase activity (which ALOX 12 and mouse 12/15-lipoxygenase possess) to MaR1 and MaR2. During this metabolism, cells also form 7-epi-Mar1, i.e. the 7S-12E isomer of Mar1, as well as the 14S-hydroxy and 14R-hydroxy metabolites of DHA. The latter hydroxy metabolites can be converted by an unidentified cytochrome P450 enzyme to maresin like-1 (Mar-L1) and Mar-L2 by omega oxidation; alternatively, DHA may be first metabolized to 22-hydroxy-DHA by CYP1A2, CYP2C8, CYP2C9, CYP2D6, CYP2E1, or CYP3A4 and then metabolized through the cited epoxide-forming pathways to Mar-L1 and MaR-L2. Studies have found that these metabolites have potent anti-inflammatory activity in vitro and in animal models. The following table lists the structural formulae (DHA stands for docosahexaenoic acid), major activities and cellular receptor targets (where known).

Trivial name	Formula	Activities	Receptor(s)
MaR1	7R,14S-dihydroxy-4Z,8E,10E,12Z,16Z,19Z-DHA	anti-inflammatory, tissue regeneration, blocks pain perception	Inhibits the activation of the vanilloid receptor TRPV1 and TRPA1
MaR2	13R,14S-dihydroxy-4Z,7Z,9E,11E,16Z,19Z-DHA	anti-inflammatory	?
7-epi-MaR1	7S,14S-dihydroxy-4Z,8E,10Z,12E,16Z,19Z-DHA	anti-inflammatory	?
MaR-L1	14S,22-dihydroxy-4Z,7Z,10Z,12E,16Z,19Z-DHA	anti-inflammatory	?
MaR-L2	14R,22-dihydroxy-4Z,7Z,10Z,12E,16Z,19Z-DHA	anti-inflammatory	?

- Studies in mice detected a series of R/S 14,21-dihydroxy-4Z,7Z,10Z,12E,16Z,19Z-docosahexaenoic acid isomers (14R,21R-diHDHA, 14R,21S-diHDHA, 14S,21R-diHDHA, and 14S,21S-diHDHA) form in inflamed tissues and in cultures of murine macrophages; the 14R,21-diHDHA and 14S,21-diHDHA isomers promoted wound healing in mouse models of inflammation.
- Mouse eosinophils metabolize DHA to a maresin-like product, 14S,20R-dihydroxy-4Z,7Z,10Z,12E,16Z,18Z-docosahexaenoic acid. This product, as well as its 14,S,20S isomer possesses potent anti-inflammatory activity in mice.
- The TRPV1 receptor is discussed in the EPA-derived resolvin section; the TRPA1 receptor is discussed in the DHA-derived resolvin section.

==== n−3 DPA-derived maresins ====
n−3 DPA-derived maresins are presumed to be formed in mammals by metabolism of n−3 DPA by an undefined 12-lipoxygenase activity to a 14-hydroperoxy-DPA intermediated and the subsequent conversion of this intermediate to di-hydroxyl products which have been termed MaR1_{n−3}, MaR2_{n−3}, and MaR3_{n−3} based on their structural analogies to MaR1, MaR2, and MaR3, respectively. MaR1_{n−3} and MaR2_{n−3} have been found to possess anti-inflammatory activity in in vitro assays of human neutrophil function. These n−3 DPA-derived maresins have not been defined with respect to the chirality of their hydroxyl residues or the cis–trans isomerism of their double bonds. The following table lists the structural formulae (DPA stands for docosapentaenoic acid), major activities and cellular receptor targets (where known).

Trivial name	Formula	Activities	Receptor(s)
MaR1_{n−3}	7S,14S-dihydroxy-8E,10E,12Z,16Z,19Z-DPA	anti-inflammatory	?
MaR2_{n−3}	13,14-dihydroxy-7Z,9E,11E,16Z,19Z-DPA	anti-inflammatory	?
MaR3_{n−3}	14,21-dihydroxy-7Z,10Z,12E,16Z,19Z-DPA	?	?

=== Other PUFA metabolites with SPM-like activity ===
The following PUFA metabolites, while not yet formally classified as SPM, have been recently described and determined to have anti-inflammatory activity.

==== n−3 DPA metabolites ====
10R,17S-dihydroxy-7Z,11E,13E,15Z,19Z-docosapentaenoic acid (10R,17S-diHDPA_{EEZ}) has been found in inflamed exudates of animal models and possesses in vitro and in vivo anti-inflammatory activity almost as potently as PD1.

==== n−6-DPA metabolites ====
n−6 DPA (i.e. 4Z,7Z,10Z,13Z,16Z-docosapentaenoic acid or osbond acid) is an isomer of n−3 DPA (clupanodonic acid) differing from the latter fatty acid only in the location of its 5 double bonds. Cells metabolize n−6 DPA to 7-hydroxy-DPA_{n−6}, 10,17-dihydroxy-DPA_{n−6}, and 7,17-dihydroxy-DPA_{n−3}; the former two metabolites have been shown to possess anti-inflammatory activity in in vitro and in animal model studies.

==== Oxo-DHA and oxo-DPA metabolites ====
Cells metabolize DHA and n−3 DPA by COX-2 to 13-hydroxy-DHA and 13-hydroxy-DPA_{n−3} products and by aspirin-treated COX-2 to 17-hydroxy-DHA and 17-hydroxy-DPA_{n−3} products and may then oxidize these products to their corresponding oxo (i.e. ketone) derivatives, 13-oxo-DHA (also termed electrophilic fatty acid oxo derivative or EFOX-D6), 13-oxo-DPA_{n−3} (EFOX-D5), 17-oxo-DHA (17-EFOX-D6), and 17-oxo-DPA_{n−3} (17-EFOX-D3). These oxo metabolites directly activate the nuclear receptor peroxisome proliferator-activated receptor gamma and possess anti-inflammatory activity as assesses in in vitro systems.

==== Docosahexaenoyl ethanolamide metabolites ====
DHA ethanolamide ester (the DHA analog of arachindonyl ethanolamide (i.e. anandamide) is metabolized to 10,17-dihydroxydocosahexaenoyl ethanolamide (10,17-diHDHEA) and/or 15-hydroxy-16(17)-epoxy-docosapentaenoyl ethanolamide (15-HEDPEA) by mouse brain tissue and human neutrophils. Both compounds possess anti-inflammatory activity in vitro; 15-HEDPEA also has tissue-protective effects in mouse models of lung injury and tissue reperfusion. Like anandamide, both compounds activated the cannabinoid receptor.

==== Prostaglandins and isoprostanes ====
PUFA derivatives containing a cyclopentenone structure are chemically reactive and can form adducts with various tissue targets, particularly proteins. Certain of these PUFA-cyclopentenones bind to the sulfur residues in the KEAP1 component of the KEAP1-NFE2L2 protein complex in the cytosol of cells. This negates KEAP1's ability to bind NFE2L2; in consequence, NFE2L2 becomes free to translocate to the nuclease and stimulate the transcription of genes that encode proteins active in detoxifying reactive oxygen species; this effect tends to reduce inflammatory reactions. PUFA-cyclopentenones may likewise react with the IKK2 component of the cytosolic IKK2-NFκB protein complex thereby inhibiting NFκB from stimulating the transcription of genes that encode various pro-inflammatory proteins. One or both of these mechanisms appears to contribute to the ability of certain highly reactive PUFA-cyclopenetenones to exhibit SPM activity. The PUFA-cyclopentenones include two prostaglandins, (PG) Δ12-PGJ2 and 15-deoxy-Δ12,14-PGJ2, and two isoprostanes, 5,6-epoxyisoprostane E2 and 5,6-epoxyisoprostane A2. Both PGJ2's are arachidonic acid-derived metabolites made by cyclooxygenases, primarily COX-2, which is induced in many cell types during inflammation. Both isoprostanes form non-enzymatically as a result the attack on the arachidonic acid bond to cellular phospholipids by reactive oxygen species; they are then release from the phospholipids to become free in attacking their target proteins. All four products have been shown to form and possess SPM activity in various in vitro studies of human and animal tissue as well as in in vivo studies of animal models of inflammation; they have been termed pro-resolving mediators of inflammation

== Gene manipulation studies ==
Mice made deficient in their 12/15-lipoxygenase gene (Alox15) exhibit a prolonged inflammatory response along with various other aspects of a pathologically enhanced inflammatory response in experimental models of cornea injury, airway inflammation, and peritonitis. These mice also show an accelerated rate of progression of atherosclerosis whereas mice made to overexpress 12/15-lipoxygenase exhibit a delayed rate of atherosclerosis development. Alox15 overexpressing rabbits exhibited reduced tissue destruction and bone loss in a model of periodontitis. Similarly, Alox5 deficient mice exhibit a worsened inflammatory component, failure to resolve, and/or decrease in survival in experimental models of respiratory syncytial virus disease, Lyme disease, Toxoplasma gondii disease, and corneal injury. These studies indicate that the suppression of inflammation is a major function of 12/15-lipoxygenase and Alox5 along with the SPMs they make in at least certain rodent experimental inflammation models; although these rodent lipoxygenases differ from human ALOX15 and ALOX5 in the profile of the PUFA metabolites that they make as well as various other parameters (e.g. tissue distribution), these genetic studies allow that human ALOX15, ALOX5, and the SPMs they make may play a similar anti-inflammatory functions in humans.

Concurrent knockout of the three members of the CYP1 family of cytochrome P450 enzymes in mice, i.e. Cyp1a1, Cyp1a2, and Cyp1b1, caused an increase in the recruitment of neutrophils to the peritoneum in mice undergoing experimental peritonitis; these triple knockout mice also exhibited an increase in the peritoneal fluid LTB4 level and decreases in the levels of peritoneal fluid NPD1 as well as the precursors to various SPMs including 5-hydroxyeicosatetraenoic acid, 15-hydroxyeicosatetraenoic acid, 18-hydroxyeicosapentaenoic acid, 17-hydroxydocosahexaenoic acid, and 14-hydroxydocosahexaenoic. These results support the notion that Cyp1 enzymes contribute to the production of certain SPMs and inflammatory responses in mice; CYP1 enzymes may therefore play a similar role in humans.

== Clinical studies ==
In a randomized controlled trial, AT-LXA4 and a comparatively stable analog of LXB4, 15R/S-methyl-LXB4, reduced the severity of eczema in a study of 60 infants. A synthetic analog of ReV1 is in clinical phase III testing (see Phases of clinical research) for the treatment of the inflammation-based dry eye syndrome; along with this study, other clinical trials (NCT01639846, NCT01675570, NCT00799552 and NCT02329743) using an RvE1 analogue to treat various ocular conditions are underway. RvE1, Mar1, and NPD1 are in clinical development studies for the treatment of neurodegenerative diseases and hearing loss. And, in a single study, inhaled LXA4 decreased LTC4-initiated bronchoprovocation in patients with asthma.

== See also ==
- N-Acylethanolamine
