= Docosapentaenoic acid =

22-Carbon polyunsaturated fatty acid

Docosapentaenoic acid (DPA) designates any straight open chain polyunsaturated fatty acid (PUFA) which contains 22 carbons and 5 double bonds. DPA is primarily used to designate two isomers, all-cis-4,7,10,13,16-docosapentaenoic acid (i.e. 4Z,7Z,10Z,13Z,16Z-docosapentaenoic acid) and all-cis-7,10,13,16,19-docosapentaenoic acid (i.e. 7Z,10Z,13Z,16Z,19Z-docosapentaenoic acid). They are also commonly termed n−6 DPA and n−3 DPA, respectively; these designations describe the position of the double bond being 6 or 3 carbons closest to the (omega) carbon at the methyl end of the molecule and is based on the biologically important difference that n−6 and n−3 PUFA are separate PUFA classes, i.e. the omega-6 fatty acids and omega-3 fatty acids, respectively. Mammals, including humans, can not interconvert these two classes and therefore must obtain dietary essential PUFA fatty acids from both classes in order to maintain normal health (see essential fatty acids).

== Isomers ==
The two isomers osbond acid and clupanodonic acid have the same number of double bonds, but on different positions along the chain, so they are regioisomers.

=== all-cis-4,7,10,13,16-docosapentaenoic acid (osbond acid) ===
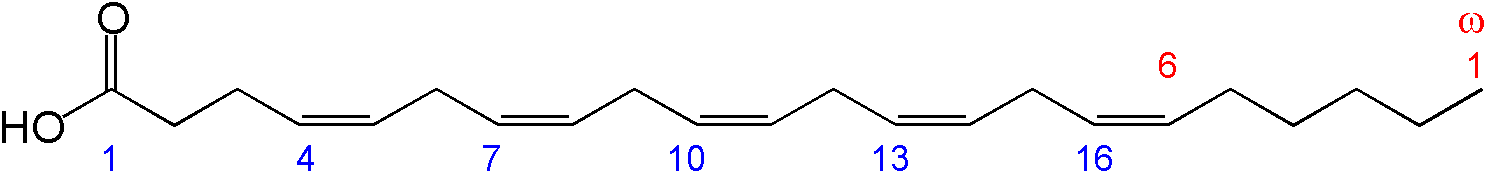
The chemical structure of osbond acid showing physiological numbering (red) and chemical numbering (blue) conventions.

n−6 DPA is an ω-6 fatty acid with the trivial name osbond acid. It is formed in two steps from eicosatetraenoic acid (5,8,11,14-20:4n−6 or arachidonic acid, AA). Arachidonic acid is elongated to docosatetraenoic acid (7,10,13,16-22:4n−6 or adrenic acid, AdA), which in turn is converted by Δ4-desaturase to osbond acid.

=== all-cis-7,10,13,16,19-docosapentaenoic acid (clupanodonic acid) ===
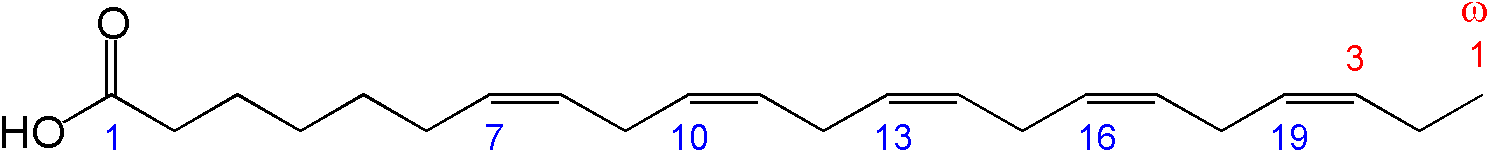
The chemical structure of clupanodonic acid showing physiological numbering (red) and chemical numbering (blue) conventions.

n−3 DPA is an n−3 fatty acid with the trivial name clupanodonic acid. It is an intermediate compound between eicosapentaenoic acid (EPA 5,8,11,14,17-20:5n−3 or timnodonic acid) and docosahexaenoic acid (DHA 4,7,10,13,16,19-22:6n−3 or cervonic acid) in the metabolic pathway of DHA in eucaryotes. Eicosapentaenoic acid is elongated to clupanodonic acid, which in turn is converted by Δ4-desaturase to docosahexaenoic acid 22:6n−3 (see Docosahexaenoic acid § Biosynthesis).

Mammalian cells, including human cells, metabolize n−3 DPA to an array of products that are members of the specialized proresolving mediators class of PUFA metabolites. These metabolites include four resolvins of T series and three of D series (RvT1, RvT2, RvT3, RvT4, RvD1_{n−3}, RvD2_{n−3}, and RvD5_{n−3} (do not confuse with D series resolvins derived from DHA); see Specialized proresolving mediators § n−3 DPA-derived resolvins and Resolvin), two protectins (PD1_{n−3} and PD2_{n−3}; see Specialized proresolving mediators § n−3 DPA-derived protectins/neuroprotectins and Neuroprotectin), and three maresins (MaR1_{n−3}, MaR2_{n−3}, and MaR3_{n−3}; see Specialized proresolving mediators § n−3 DPA-derived maresins and Maresin).

==== Dietary sources ====
These are the top five sources for n−3 DPA according to the USDA Agricultural Research Service:

1. Fish oil, menhaden 0.668 g in 1 tbsp. (13.6 g)
2. Fish oil, salmon 0.407 g in 1 tbsp. (13.6 g)
3. Salmon, red (sockeye), filets with skin, smoked (Alaska Native) 0.335 g in 1 filet (108 g)
4. Fish, salmon, Atlantic, farmed, raw 0.334 g in 3 oz (85 g)
5. Beef, variety meats and by-products, brain, cooked, simmered 0.326 g in 3 oz (85 g)

Seal meat and human breast milk are rich in n−3 DPA.

==== Functions ====
n−3 DPA (clupanodonic acid) along with its metabolite DHA and other long chain omega-3 fatty acids, is under study to determine properties of omega-3 fats in humans, such as in inflammation mechanisms.

== See also ==
- List of omega-3 fatty acids
