= Charles N. Serhan =

American scientist

Charles Nicholas Serhan is the Simon Gelman Professor of Anaesthesia (Biochemistry and Molecular Pharmacology) at Harvard Medical School and a professor of Oral Medicine, Infection and Immunity at Harvard School of Dental Medicine. Serhan is the Director of the Center for Experimental Therapeutics and Reperfusion Injury at Brigham and Women's Hospital.

== Education ==
Serhan completed his Bachelor of Science in biochemistry at State University of New York at Stony Brook in 1978. In 1982, Serhan earned a doctorate in Experimental Pathology and Medical Sciences from New York University School of Medicine. Following his graduation, Serhan began a postdoctoral fellowship at the Karolinska Institute in Stockholm, Sweden under the mentorship of Bengt Samuelsson. Serhan has also received honorary degrees from Harvard University, University College Dublin, and Queen Mary College, University of London.

== Career ==
The focus of Serhan's research are Specialized Pro-Resolving Mediators (SPMs), which are "inflammation-fighting molecules in the body derived from essential fatty acids". While working with Mats Hamberg and Bengt Samuelsson at the Karolinska Institute, Serhan helped discover lipoxin the first of the SPMs to be elucidated. Since this initial discovery, Serhan has identified additional mediators including Resolvins, Maresins, and Protectins.

Serhan became a faculty member at Harvard Medical School in 1987 and the Director of the Center for Experimental Therapeutics and Reperfusion Injury at Brigham and Women's Hospital (CET&RI). The CET&RI's mission is: "To identify novel mediators, pathways, and their cellular receptors and targets critical in promoting resolution of inflammation and reperfusion tissue injury and establish their relation to human disease".

=== Awards and honors ===
Serhan was awarded the John Vane Medal from The William Harvey Research Institute in 2008. In 2016, he received the Ross Prize in Molecular Medicine. He was awarded the International Eicosanoid Research Foundation's 2017 Lifetime Achievement Award. Serhan was the American Society for Investigative Pathology (ASIP) Rous-Whipple Award recipient in 2018 and became an Honorary Life Member of the Society for Leukocyte Biology in 2019. In 2022, Serhan delivered the Hans L. Falk Memorial Lecture at the National Institute of Environmental Health Sciences.
