= Oxoeicosanoid =

The oxoeicosanoids are nonclassic eicosanoids, derived from arachidonic acid (AA). For example, Lipoxygenase produces 5-HETE from AA; a dehydrogenase then produces 5-oxo-eicosatetraenoic acid, an oxoeicosanoid, from 5-HETE.

They are similar to the leukotrienes in their actions, but they act via a different receptor.
