= Resolvin =

Class of chemical compounds

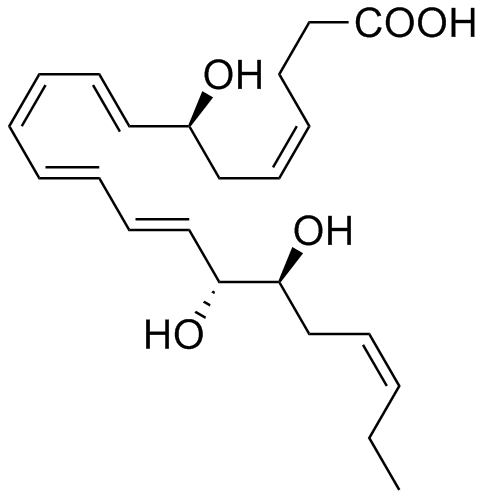
Resolvin D2 (RvD2)

Resolvins are specialized pro-resolving mediators (SPMs) derived from omega-3 fatty acids, primarily eicosapentaenoic acid (EPA) and docosahexaenoic acid (DHA), as well as from two isomers of docosapentaenoic acid (DPA), one omega-3 and one omega-6 fatty acid. As autacoids similar to hormones acting on local tissues, resolvins are under preliminary research for their involvement in promoting restoration of normal cellular function following the inflammation that occurs after tissue injury. Resolvins belong to a class of polyunsaturated fatty acid (PUFA) metabolites termed specialized proresolving mediators (SPMs).

== Biochemistry and production ==
Resolvins (Rvs) fall into several sub-classes based on the straight chain PUFA from which they are formed and derive their unique structure. The resolvins Ds (RvDs) are metabolites of the 22-carbon PUFA, DHA (i.e. 4Z,7Z,10Z,13Z,16Z,19Z-docosahexaenoic acid); the resolvins Es (RvEs) are metabolites of the 20-carbon PUFA, EPA (i.e. 5Z,8Z,11Z,14Z,17Z-eicosapentaenoic acid); the resolvins D_{n-6DPA} (RvDs_{n-6DPA}) are metabolites of the DPA isomer, osbond acid (i.e. 4Z,7Z,10Z,13Z,16Z-docosapentaenoic acid); the resolvins D_{n-3DPA} (RvD_{n-3DPA}) are metabolites of the DPA isomer, clupanodonic acid (i.e. 7Z,10Z,13Z,16Z,19Z-docosapentaenoic acid); and the resolvins Ts (RvTs) are metabolites of clupanodonic acid, that possess a 17R hydroxyl residue, whereas all RvDs_{n-3DPA} resolvins have a 17S hydroxyl residue. Certain isomers of RvDs are termed aspirin-triggered resolvin Ds (AT-RvDs) because their synthesis is initiated by a drug-modified COX-2 enzyme to form 17(R) hydroxyl rather than 17(S) hydroxyl residue of the RvEs; however, an unidentified as of 2023 cytochrome P450 enzyme(s) may also form this 17(R)-hydroxy intermediate and thereby contribute to the production of AT-RvEs. All of the cited resolvins except the RvDs_{n-6DPA} are metabolites of omega-3 fatty acids.

The following oxygenase enzymes may be responsible for metabolizing PUFA to resolvins: 15-lipoxygenase-1 (i.e. ALOX15), possibly 15-lipoxygenase-2 (i.e. ALOX15B), 5-lipoxygenase (i.e. ALOX5), cyclooxygenase-2 (i.e. COX-2), and certain cytochrome P450 monooxygenases.

=== Resolvin Ds ===
RvDs are poly-hydroxyl metabolites of DHA. To date, six RvDs, which vary in the number, position, and chirality of their hydroxyl residues as well as the position and cis–trans isomerism of their 6 double bonds, have been described. These are: RvD1 (7S,8R,17S-trihydroxy-DHA), RvD2 (7S,16R,17S-trihydroxy-DHA), RvD3 (4S,7R,17S-trihydroxy-DHA), RvD4 (4S,5,17S-trihydroxy-DHA; chirality at position 5 not yet determined as of 2023), RvD5 (7S,17S-dihydroxy-DHA), and RvD6 (4S,17S-dihydroxy-DHA). (The structures of these RvDs are further defined at Specialized pro-resolving mediators § DHA-derived resolvins). These metabolites are formed by a wide range of cells and tissues by the initial metabolism of DHA to 7S-hydroperoxy-DHA and 4S-hydroperoxy-DHA by a 15-lipoxygenase (either ALOX15 or possibly ALOX15B) followed by the further metabolism of the two intermediates by ALOX5 to their 17-hydroperoxy derivatives; these di-hydroperoxy products are further altered to the cited RvDs by these oxygenases or by non-enzymatic reactions and the conversion of their peroxy residues ubiquitous cellular peroxidases.

=== Resolvin Es ===
RvEs are di- or tri-hydroxyl metabolites of EPA. To date, four RvEs have been described: RvE1 (5S,12R,18R-trihydroxy-EPA), 18S-Rv1 (5S,12R,18S-trihydroxy-EPA), RvE2 (5S,18R-dihydroxy-EPA), and RvE3 (17R,18R/S-dihydroxy-EPA). (Structures of the RvEs are further defined at Specialized pro-resolving mediators § EPA-derived resolvins). Resolvins Es are formed in manner similar to AT resolvins Ts. COX-2 modified in activity by aspirin or atorvastatin or, alternatively, a microbial or possibly mammalian cytochrome P450 monoxygenase metabolizes EPA to its 18R-hydroperoxy derivative; this intermediate is then further metabolized by ALOX5 to a 5,6 epoxide which is hydrolyzed enzymatically or non-enzymatically to RvE1 and 18S-RvE1 or reduced to RvE2; alternatively the 18R-hydroperoxide is converted to the 17R,18S vicinal diol product, RvE3.

=== T series resolvins ===
Human platelets pretreated with aspirin or atorvastatin metabolize the omega-3 DPA, clupanodonic acid (DPA_{n-3}) by aspirin-treated or atorvastatin-treated COX-2 to a 13S-hydroperoxy intermediate (aspirin and atorvastatin change the activity of COX-2 from a cyclooxygenase to a hydroxyperoxidase-forming enzyme. The intermediate is then passed to nearby human neutrophils which metabolize it, probably by ALOX5 enzyme activity, to four poly-hydroxyl metabolites: RvT1 (7S,13R,20S-trihydroxy-8E,10Z,14E,16Z,18E-DPA), RvT2 (7S,12R,13S-trihydroxy-8Z,10E,14E,16Z,19Z-DPA), RvT3 (7S,8R,13S-trihydroxy-9E,11E,14E,16Z,19Z-DPA), and RvT4 (7S,13R-dihydroxy-8E,10Z,14E,16Z,19Z-DPA). Subsequent studies found that these four RvTs are also formed by mixtures of human neutrophils and vascular endothelium cells and, additionally, are detected in the infected tissues of rodents and humans.

== Putative mechanisms ==
Following tissue injury, the inflammatory response is a protective process to promote restoration of the tissue to homeostasis. Resolution of inflammation involves various specialized lipid mediators, including resolvins. Resolvins are under laboratory research for their potential to act through G protein-coupled receptors (GPRs): 1) RvD1 and AT-RvD1 act through the formyl peptide receptor 2, which is also activated by certain lipoxins and is therefore often termed the ALX/FPR2 receptor; 2) RvD1, AT-RVD1, RvD3, AT-RvD3, and RvD5 act through the GPR32 receptor which is now also termed the RVD1 receptor; 3) RvD2 acts through the GPR18 receptor also now termed the RvD2 receptor; and 4) RvE1 and the 18(S) analog of RvE1 are full activators while RvE2 is a partial activator of the CMKLR1 receptor. All of these receptors activate their parent cells through standard GPR-mobilized pathways. RvE1, 18(S)-RvE1, and RvE2 inhibit the leukotriene B4 receptor 1 which is the receptor for inflammation-promoting PUFA metabolites such as LTB4 and the R stereoisomer of 12-HETE; by inhibiting the action of these pro-inflammatory mediators.
