= Protectin D1 =

Names
- Preferred IUPAC name (4Z,7Z,10R,11E,13E,15Z,17S,19Z)-10,17-Dihydroxydocosa-4,7,11,13,15,19-hexaenoic acid
- Other names 10R,17S-Dihydroxy-docosa-4Z,7Z,11E,13E,15Z,19Z-hexaenoate; 10R,17S-Dihydroxy-docosa-4Z,7Z,11E,13E,15Z,19Z-hexaenoic acid; Neuroprotectin D1

Identifiers
CAS Number	660430-03-5
3D model (JSmol)	Interactive image
ChemSpider	13171083
PubChem CID	16042541
UNII	P3FX063KLI
CompTox Dashboard (EPA)	DTXSID101031663
- InChI: InChI=1S/C22H32O4/c1-2-3-10-15-20(23)17-12-8-9-13-18-21(24)16-11-6-4-5-7-14-19-22(25)26/h3,5-13,17-18,20-21,23-24H,2,4,14-16,19H2,1H3,(H,25,26)/b7-5-,9-8+,10-3-,11-6-,17-12-,18-13+/t20-,21+/m0/s1 Key: CRDZYJSQHCXHEG-SFVBTVKNSA-N
- SMILES: O=C(O)CC\C=C/C/C=C\C[C@@H](O)\C=C\C=C\C=C/[C@@H](O)C\C=C/CC

Properties
Chemical formula	C_{22}H_{32}O_{4}
Molar mass	360.4871 g/mol
Density	1.049 g/cm^{3}
Boiling point	559.379 °C (1,038.882 °F; 832.529 K)
Solubility in water	0.0069
log P	4.95
Acidity (pK_{a})	4.82
- Except where otherwise noted, data are given for materials in their standard state (at 25 °C [77 °F], 100 kPa). Infobox references

Protectin D1 also known as neuroprotectin D1 (when it acts in the nervous system) and abbreviated most commonly as PD1 or NPD1 is a member of the class of specialized proresolving mediators. Like other members of this class of polyunsaturated fatty acid metabolites, it possesses strong anti-inflammatory, anti-apoptotic and neuroprotective activity. PD1 is an aliphatic acyclic alkene 22 carbons in length with two hydroxyl groups at the 10 and 17 carbon positions and one carboxylic acid group at the one carbon position.

Specifically, PD1 is an endogenous stereoselective lipid mediator classified as an autocoid protectin. Autacoids are enzymatically derived chemical mediators with distinct biological activities and molecular structures. Protectins are signaling molecules that are produced enzymatically from unsaturated fatty acids. Their molecular structure is characterized by the presence of a conjugated system of double bonds. PD1, like other protectins, is produced by the oxygenation of the ω-3 polyunsaturated fatty acid docosahexaenoic acid (DHA) and it is found in many tissues, such as the retina, the lungs and the nervous system.

PD1 has a significant role as an anti-inflammatory, anti-apoptotic and neuroprotective molecule. Studies in Alzheimer's disease animal models and in human retina pigment epithelial cells (RPE) have shown that PD1 can potentially reduce inflammation induced by oxidative stress and inhibit the pro-apoptotic signal, thereby preventing cellular degeneration. Finally, recent studies examining the pathogenicity of influenza viruses, including the avian flu (H5N1), have suggested that PD1 can potentially halt the proliferation of the virus, thus protecting respiratory cells from lethal viral infections.

== Biosynthesis of PD1 ==
In vivo, PD1 is mainly produced as a response to inflammatory signals and it is found in various tissues, such as the retina pigment epithelial cells, lung epithelial cells, peripheral blood mononuclear cells (PBMC) and neural tissues. Studies in PBMC have shown that endogenous DHA, the main precursor of PD1, is released by the activity of phospholipase A2. According to these studies, PD1 is preferentially synthesized in PBMC cells skewed to the Type 2 T helper cell phenotype (T_{H}2). This suggests that T-cell differentiation plays an important role in the activation of the PD1 biosynthetic pathway. The interaction of PBMC with interleukin 4 (IL-4), a potent inflammatory signal, leads to the differentiation of PBMC to T_{H}2 type lymphocytes. In addition, activated T_{H}2 cells further release IL-4, leading to the up-regulation of the enzyme 15-lipoxygenase-1 (15-LO-1). 15-LO-1 is a non-heme iron-carrying dioxygenase that adds oxygen atoms in a stereospecific manner on free and esterified ω-3 polyunsaturated fatty acids like DHA. Overall, the biosynthesis of PD1 proceeds through three distinct steps throughout which the activity of 15-LO-1 is essential. In the first step of the biosynthetic pathway, the binding of 15-LO-1 to its substrate (DHA) leads to the formation of the (17S)-hydro(peroxy)-DHA intermediate. This intermediate is rapidly processed to form a 16(17)-epoxide-containing molecule, which is the second intermediate. Finally, in the third step of the pathway, enzymatic hydrolysis of the 16(17)-epoxide-containing intermediate leads to the formation of PD1.

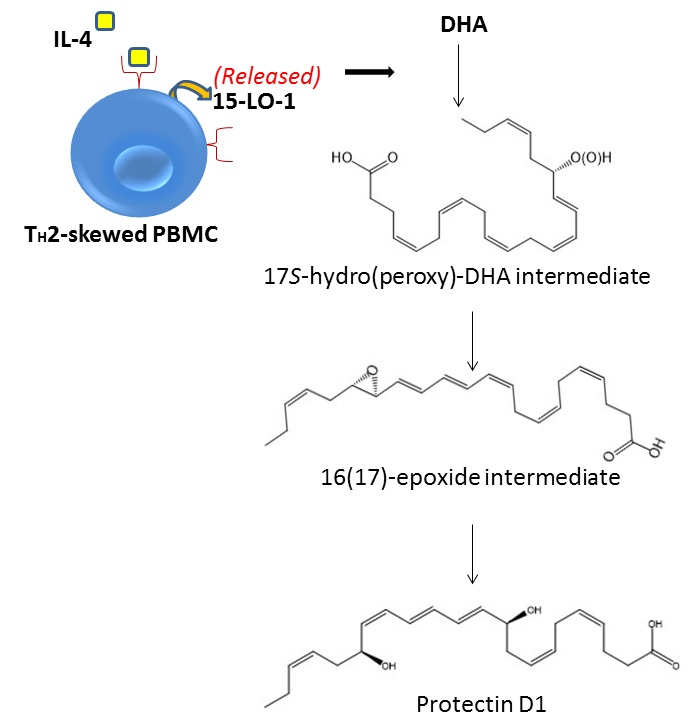

== Functions of PD1 ==
In general, PD1 in vivo exhibits a potent anti-apoptotic and anti-inflammatory activity in the tissues in which it is localized. DHA, the main PD1 precursor, is mostly found in tissues such as the retinal synapses, photoreceptors, the lungs and the brain, suggesting that these tissues are more likely to be benefited from the protecting activity of PD1.

=== Activity of PD1 in the retina ===
RPE are essential in the survival and renewal of the photoreceptors in the retina. These cells exhibit a potent phagocytic activity that ensures the proper function of the retina. Therefore, oxidative stress can potentially damage the RPE cells and cause vision impairment. Studies in human RPE cells have suggested that the presence of oxidative stress triggering molecules, such as H_{2}O_{2} causes the fragmentation of the DNA that in turn triggers apoptosis. These studies have proposed that PD1 acts as a signaling molecule and through its ligand-receptor interaction down-regulates the expression of genes, such as the transcription factor NF-κB. The inhibition of NF-κB results in the down-regulation of the pro-inflammatory gene COX-2 (cyclooxygenase-2) which is responsible for the release of prostaglandins, a potent pro-inflammatory mediator. In addition, PD1 has an important role in regulating the expression of the Bcl-2 family proteins (Bcl-2, Bcl-x_{L}, Bax and Bad) that precedes the release of the cytochrome c complex from the mitochondria and the formation of the apoptosome. The presence of PD1 up-regulates the expression of the anti-apoptotic proteins Bcl-2 and Bcl-x_{L}, while it inhibits the expression of the pro-apoptotic proteins Bax and Bad. Specifically, PD1 regulates this protein family by promoting the dephosphorylation of Bcl-x_{L} by protein phosphatase 2A (PP2A) at residue Ser-62 which in turn heterodimerizes with the pro-apoptotic protein Bax and inactivates it. Consequently, the activity of the Bcl-2 family proteins results in the inhibition of the caspase 3 enzyme, thus preventing apoptosis and promoting RPE cell survival.

=== Effects of PD1 in Alzheimer's disease ===
Among others, Alzheimer's disease is characterized by the reduced concentration of PD1 and by the increased concentration of the amyloid-β peptide (Aβ42) that is responsible for the formation of senile plaques and also induces inflammation and apoptosis in neuronal tissues. Aβ42 is generated by the enzymatic cleavage of the β-amyloid precursor protein (βΑPP) through β- and γ- secretases. Like other pro-inflammatory mediators, Aβ42 induces inflammation through the activation of the pro-inflammatory enzyme COX-2 and the release of prostaglandins. Moreover, the release of Aβ42 down-regulates the anti-apoptotic proteins Bcl-2 and Bcl-x_{L} and up-regulates the pro-apoptotic proteins Bax and Bad that ultimately lead to the formation of the apoptosome. PD1 in human neuronal glial cells (HNG) has been shown to trigger the down-regulation of βΑPP, thus decreasing the Aβ42 content in neuronal tissues and reducing inflammation and apoptosis. Specifically, PD1 in Alzheimer's disease models has been shown to respond to the increased concentration of the pro-inflammatory molecule Aβ42 by binding and activating the peroxisome proliferator-activated receptor gamma (PPARγ) either directly or via other mechanisms. According to some models the activation of PPARγ leads to increased ubiquitination and degradation of βAPP, thus reducing the release of Aβ42. Furthermore, PD1 inhibits the production of Aβ42 peptide by down-regulating β-secretase-1 (BACE1), while up-regulating the α-secretase ADAM10 and the secreted amyloid precursor protein-α (sAPPα). Overall, the above mechanism leads to the cleavage of βAPP protein though a non-amyloidogenic pathway that halts the formation of Aβ42 and prevents the premature neuronal degeneration.

=== Antiviral activity of PD1 ===
Studies in cultured human lung epithelial cells infected with the influenza virus H1N1 or H5N1 have found that endogenous production of PD1 decreases dramatically during infection due to the inhibition of 15-LO-1. Furthermore, the same studies have shown that in vivo administration of PD1 to H1N1 infected mice can potentially inhibit both the proliferation of the virus and the inflammation caused by the infection, thus increasing survival. PD1 protects against viral infections by disrupting the virus life cycle. Specifically, PD1 inhibits the binding of viral RNA to specific nuclear export factors in the host cells, thus blocking the export of viral RNA from the nucleus to the cytosol. The nuclear RNA export factor 1(NXF1) is of particular interest in the attenuation of viral infections via the activity of PD1. Specifically, the NXF1 transporter through its middle and C-terminal domains binds to the phenylalanine/glycine repeats in the nucleoporins (Nups) that line the nuclear pore. In the absence of PD1, influenza viral RNA binds to the NXF1 transporter that later binds specifically to Nup62 nucleoporin and exports the viral RNA into the cytosol. However, the administration of PD1 has shown that this lipid mediator specifically inhibits the binding of the viral RNA to NXF1, thus disrupting the proliferation of the virus.

== Laboratory Synthesis of PD1 ==
The large scale industrial production of PD1 is of great interest for pharmaceutical companies in order to harvest the potent anti-inflammatory and anti-apoptotic activities of this lipid mediator. So far, very few stereoselective laboratory syntheses of PD1 have been reported, but with a relatively low yield.

=== Convergent Stereoselective Synthesis ===
According to one method, PD1 is synthesized in 15% yield through an 8-step convergent stereoselective process. Initially, the alkyne, (Z)-3-tertbutyldimethylsiloxy-oct-5-en-1-yne reacts with bromo-E,E,Z,Z-tetraene ester in a Sonogashira cross-coupling reaction at room temperature in the presence of Pd-(PPh_{3})_{4} and CuI using diethylamine as a solvent which produces the bis-hydroxyl-protected methyl ester. Removal of the two tert-butyldimethylsilyl ethers (TBS-protecting groups) is attained with an excess of TBAF in THF at 0 °C which produces a diol containing a conjugated alkyne. The conjugated alkyne is reduced to the methyl ester. In addition, the diol is hydrogenated using the Lindlar catalyst, with 1-octene added as a sacrificial olefin, to produce a highly stereoselective triene, while water is eliminated from the diol through a Boland reduction. Finally, the methyl ester undergoes saponification at 0 °C with dilute LiOH (aq.) in methanol followed by acidic work-up with NaH_{2}PO_{4} (aq.) in order to produce PD1.

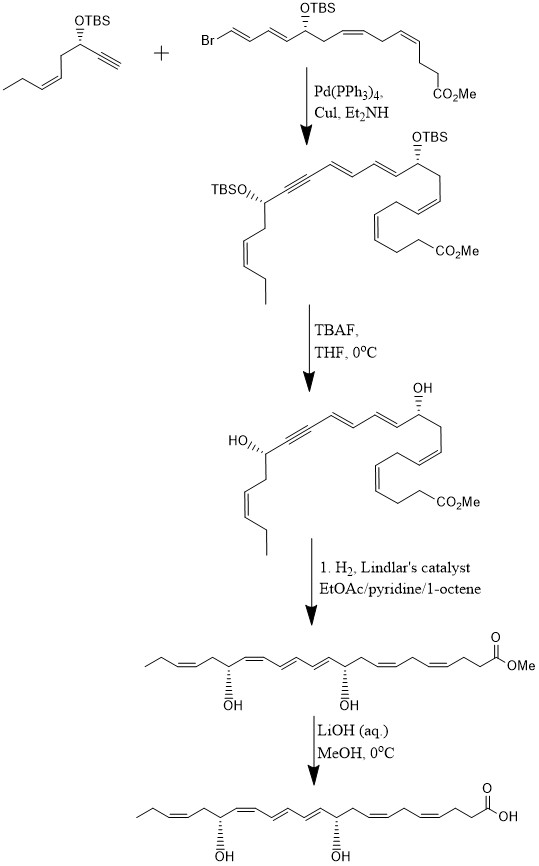

=== Alternative Stereoselective Synthesis ===
Alternatively, PD1 laboratory synthesis proceeds through a different stereoselective method. Initially, hydroboration of a TBS-protected acetylene with Sia_{2}BH produces a TBS-protected vinylborane. The TBS-protected vinylborane reacts with vinyliodide in the presence of a Pd-catalyst, sodium hydroxide (NaOH) and THF to produce a TBS-protected alcohol. Later treatment of the TBS-protected alcohol with TBAF removes the protecting group and produces a diol. Finally, the diol is hydrolyzed with LiOH in THF (aq.) to produce PD1.

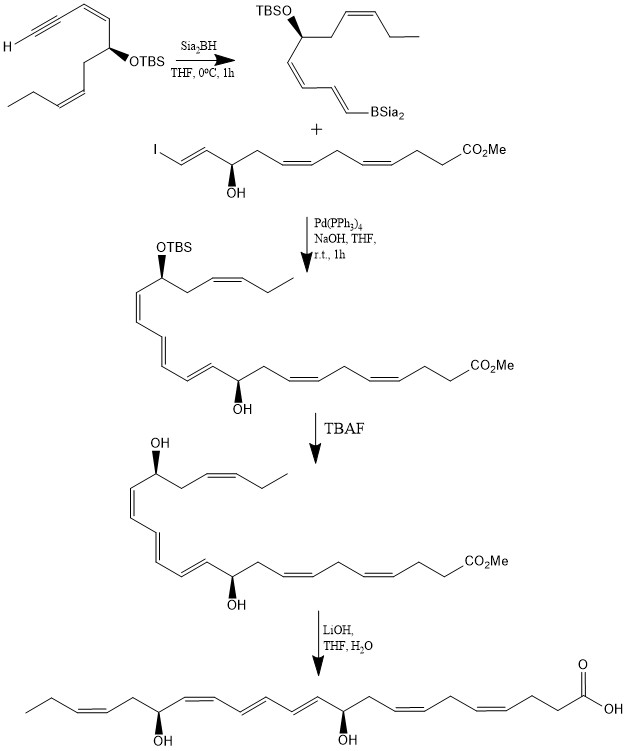

== Other PDs ==
=== 22-hydroxy-NPD1 ===
22-hydroxy-PD1 (22-OH-PD1; i.e. 10R,17S,20-trihydroxy-4Z,7Z,11E,13E,15Z,19Z-docosahexaenoic acid) is an omega oxidation product of PD1 probably formed in cells by the action of an unidentified Cytochrome P450 omega hydroxylase (see specialized proresolving mediators#Protectins/neuroprotectins). While the omega oxidation of many bioactive fatty acid metabolites such as leukotriene B4, 5-HETE, 5-oxo-eicosatetraenoic acid (i.e. 5-oxo-ETE) results in a ~100-fold fall in their activity, the omega oxidized product of PD1 has been shown to possess potent ease exhibits potent anti-inflammatory and proresolving actions by inhibiting PMN chemotaxis in vivo and in vitro and decreased pro-inflammatory mediator levels in inflammatory exudates of an animal model at levels comparable to PD1.

=== Protectin DX ===
Protectin DX (PDX; i.e. 10S,17S-dihydroxy-4Z,7Z,11E,13Z,15E,19Z-docosahexaenoic acid) is the 13Z,15E,19Z isomer of NPD1 (which has the 13E,15Z,19Z double bond configuration)(see specialized proresolving mediators#Protectins/neuroprotectins). An early study mistakenly used PDX instead of PD1 in attributing anti-replicative and clinically beneficial effects in viral influenza disease in a mouse model to PD1. PDX also inhibits influx of circulating leukocytes into the peritoneum in a mouse model of inflammation. PDX has other anti-inflammatory actions. It inhibits COX-1 and COX-2 thereby blocking the formation of pro-inflammatory prostaglandins; it also inhibits the platelet-aggregating action of thromboxane A2 thereby blocking the platelet aggregations responses to agents that depend on platelets to release thromboxane A2.

=== Aspirin-triggered PD1 ===
Aspirin-triggered PD1 (AT-PD1 or 17-epi-PD1: i.e. 10R,17R-dihydroxy-4Z,7Z,11E,13E,15Z,19Z-docosahexaenoic acid) is the 10R-hydroxy isomer of PD1 (which has the 10S hydroxy residue) (see specialized proresolving mediators#Protectins/neuroprotectins). AT-PD1 has been shown to a) reduce the infiltration of neutrophils into the peritoneum in a mouse model of inflammatory disease; b) stimulate the Efferocytosis (i.e. engulfment and removal) of neutrophils; and c) reduce brain infarction and stroke in a rodent model.

=== 10-epi-PD1 ===
10-Epi-PD1 (ent-AT-NPD1: i.e. 10S,17S-Dihydroxy-4Z,7Z,11E,13E,15Z,19Z-docosahexaenoic acid) is the 10S-hydroxy isomer of AT-PD1 (which has a 10R-hydroxy residue) (see specialized proresolving mediators#Protectins/neuroprotectins). 10-Epi-PD1 was detected in only a small amount in human PMN extracts but was more potent than PD1 or PDX in blocking the inflammatory response to zymosan A-induced murine acute peritonitis.
