= ALOX15B =

Protein-coding gene in humans

Identifiers
- Aliases: ALOX15B, 15-LOX-2, arachidonate 15-lipoxygenase, type B, arachidonate 15-lipoxygenase type B
- External IDs: OMIM: 603697; MGI: 1098228; GeneCards: ALOX15B
Available structures
PDB	Ortholog search: PDBe RCSB
PDB	List of PDB id codes 4NRE
Enzyme activity
EC #	BRENDA	ExPASy	KEGG	MetaCyc
1.13.11.33	↗	↗	↗	↗

Gene location (Human)
Chr.	Chromosome 17 (human)
Band	17p13.1	Start	8,039,034 bp
Band	17p13.1	End	8,049,134 bp

Gene location (Mouse)
Chr.	Chromosome 11 (mouse)
Band	11|11 B3	Start	69,074,758 bp
Band	11|11 B3	End	69,088,669 bp
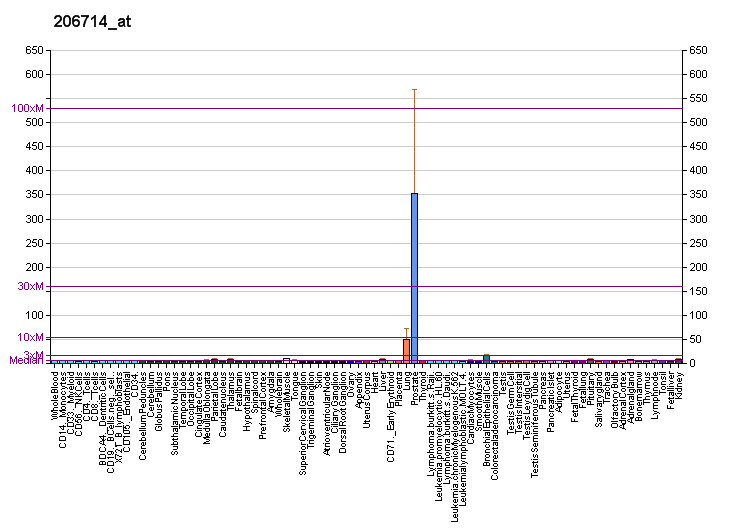
RNA expression pattern
Bgee	Human / Mouse (ortholog); Top expressed in: skin of thigh; skin of arm; vulva; prostate; right lung; nipple; vagina; skin of abdomen; upper lobe of lung; upper lobe of left lung / Top expressed in: lip; dentate gyrus of hippocampal formation granule cell; embryo; hair follicle; skin of external ear; superior frontal gyrus; primary visual cortex; otic vesicle; cerebellar cortex; skin of abdomen; More reference expression data
BioGPS	More reference expression data
Gene ontology
Molecular function	iron ion binding; calcium ion binding; dioxygenase activity; metal ion binding; arachidonate 8(S)-lipoxygenase activity; linoleate 13S-lipoxygenase activity; oxidoreductase activity; oxidoreductase activity, acting on single donors with incorporation of molecular oxygen, incorporation of two atoms of oxygen; lipid binding; arachidonate 15-lipoxygenase activity
Cellular component	intracellular anatomical structure; extracellular exosome; extrinsic component of membrane; cytosol; nucleus; membrane; cytoskeleton; plasma membrane; cytoplasm
Biological process	apoptotic process; linoleic acid metabolic process; negative regulation of growth; lipid metabolism; positive regulation of keratinocyte differentiation; negative regulation of cell cycle; prostate gland development; lipoxygenase pathway; hepoxilin biosynthetic process; positive regulation of macrophage derived foam cell differentiation; negative regulation of cell migration; positive regulation of peroxisome proliferator activated receptor signaling pathway; regulation of epithelial cell differentiation; negative regulation of cell population proliferation; arachidonic acid metabolic process
Sources:Amigo / QuickGO
Orthologs
Databases	NCBI: entry; OMA: entry
Species	Human	Mouse
Entrez	247	11688
Ensembl	ENSG00000179593	ENSMUSG00000020891
UniProt	O15296	O35936
RefSeq (mRNA)	NM_001141; NM_001039130; NM_001039131	NM_009661
RefSeq (protein)	NP_001034219; NP_001034220; NP_001132	NP_033791
Location (UCSC)	Chr 17: 8.04 – 8.05 Mb	Chr 11: 69.07 – 69.09 Mb
PubMed search
- Wikidata
View/Edit Human	View/Edit Mouse

Arachidonate 15-lipoxygenase type II is an enzyme that in humans is encoded by the ALOX15B gene. ALOX15B, also known as 15-lipoxygenase-2 (15-LO-2 or 15-LOX-2), is distinguished from its related oxygenase, ALOX15 or 15-lipoxygenase-1.

== Function ==
This gene encodes a member of the lipoxygenase family of structurally related nonheme iron dioxygenases involved in the production of fatty acid hydroperoxides. 15-LOX-2 has 38-39% amino acid sequence identity to human 15-LOX-1 and 12-lipoxygenase and 44% amino acid sequence identity to human 5-lipoxygenase. 15-LOX-2 converts arachidonic acid almost exclusively to the S stereoisomer of 15-Hydroperoxyicosatetraenoic acid which is commonly reduced to the S stereoisomer 15-Hydroxyeicosatetraenoic acid by ubiquitous cellular peroxidases; it metabolizes linoleic acid less effectively, converting this fatty acid to the S stereoisomer of 13-hydroperoxyoctadecadienoic acid which is likewise rapidly reduced to the S stereoisomer of 13-Hydroxyoctadecadienoic acid. The ALOX15B gene is located in a cluster of related genes and a pseudogene that spans approximately 100 kilobases on the short arm of chromosome 17. Alternatively spliced transcript variants encoding different isoforms have been described.

== See also ==
- Arachidonate 15-lipoxygenase
- 15-hydroxyicosatetraenoic acid
- ALOX15
