= Glutathione S-transferase, C-terminal domain =

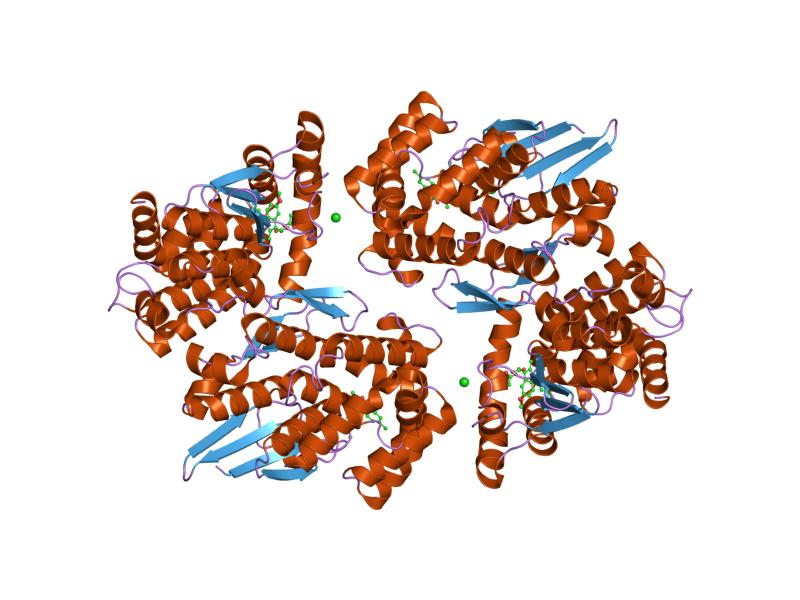

Identifiers
- Symbol: GST_C
- Pfam: PF00043
- InterPro: IPR004046
- SCOP2: 2gst / SCOPe / SUPFAM
- OPM superfamily: 131
- OPM protein: 1z9h
- CDD: cd00299
Available protein structures:
- PDB: IPR004046 PF00043 (ECOD; PDBsum)
- AlphaFold: IPR004046; PF00043

Glutathione S-transferase, C-terminal domain is a structural domain of glutathione S-transferase (GST).

GST conjugates reduced glutathione to a variety of targets including S-crystallin from squid, the eukaryotic elongation factor 1-gamma, the HSP26 family of stress-related proteins and auxin-regulated proteins in plants.

The glutathione molecule binds in a cleft between N and C-terminal domains. The catalytically important residues are proposed to reside in the N-terminal domain. In plants, GSTs are encoded by a large gene family (48 GST genes in Arabidopsis) and can be divided into the phi, tau, theta, zeta, and lambda classes.

== Biological function and classification ==
In eukaryotes, glutathione S-transferases (GSTs) participate in the detoxification of reactive electrophilic compounds by catalysing their conjugation to glutathione. The GST domain is also found in S-crystallins from squid, and proteins with no known GST activity, such as eukaryotic elongation factors 1-gamma and the HSP26 family of stress-related proteins, which include auxin-regulated proteins in plants and stringent starvation proteins in Escherichia coli. The major lens polypeptide of cephalopods is also a GST.

Bacterial GSTs of known function often have a specific, growth-supporting role in biodegradative metabolism: epoxide ring opening and tetrachlorohydroquinone reductive dehalogenation are two examples of the reactions catalysed by these bacterial GSTs. Some regulatory proteins, like the stringent starvation proteins, also belong to the GST family. GST seems to be absent from Archaea in which gamma-glutamylcysteine substitute to glutathione as major thiol.

== Oligomerization ==
Glutathione S-transferases form homodimers, but in eukaryotes can also form heterodimers of the A1 and A2 or YC1 and YC2 subunits. The homodimeric enzymes display a conserved structural fold. Each monomer is composed of a distinct N-terminal sub-domain, which adopts the thioredoxin fold, and a C-terminal all-helical sub-domain. This entry is the C-terminal domain.

== Human proteins containing this domain ==
EEF1E1; EEF1G; GDAP1; GSTA1; GSTA2; GSTA3; GSTA4; GSTA5; GSTM1; GSTM2; GSTM3; GSTM4; GSTM5; GSTO1; GSTP1; GSTT1; GSTT2; GSTZ1; MARS; HPGDS; PTGDS2; PTGES2; VARS;
