= GSTK1 =

Protein-coding gene in the species Homo sapiens

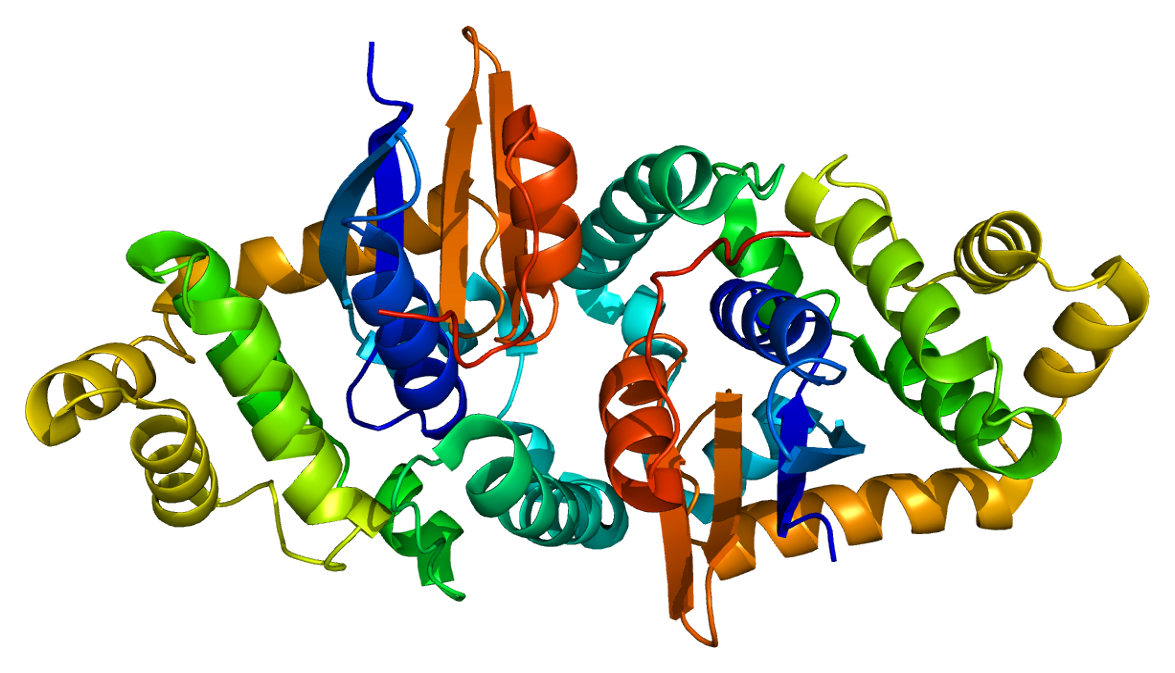
Available structures
PDB	Ortholog search: PDBe RCSB
PDB	List of PDB id codes 1YZX, 3RPN, 3RPP

Identifiers
- Aliases: GSTK1, GST, GST 13-13, GST13, GST13-13, GSTK1-1, hglutathione S-transferase kappa 1
- External IDs: OMIM: 602321; MGI: 1923513; HomoloGene: 41075; GeneCards: GSTK1; OMA:GSTK1 - orthologs

Gene location (Human)
Chr.	Chromosome 7 (human)
Band	7q34	Start	143,244,093 bp
Band	7q34	End	143,270,854 bp

Gene location (Mouse)
Chr.	Chromosome 6 (mouse)
Band	6|6 B2.1	Start	42,222,869 bp
Band	6|6 B2.1	End	42,227,381 bp
RNA expression pattern
Bgee	Human / Mouse (ortholog); Top expressed in: granulocyte; apex of heart; mucosa of transverse colon; right lobe of liver; rectum; monocyte; right adrenal cortex; right uterine tube; left lobe of thyroid gland; right lobe of thyroid gland / Top expressed in: left lobe of liver; epithelium of stomach; right ventricle; duodenum; mucous cell of stomach; adrenal gland; myocardium of ventricle; pyloric antrum; interventricular septum; right kidney; More reference expression data
BioGPS	n/a
Gene ontology
Molecular function	protein-disulfide reductase activity; transferase activity; glutathione peroxidase activity; glutathione transferase activity; signaling receptor binding; protein binding
Cellular component	mitochondrial inner membrane; mitochondrial matrix; peroxisome; extracellular exosome; intracellular anatomical structure; membrane; mitochondrion; peroxisomal matrix; cytosol
Biological process	epithelial cell differentiation; glutathione derivative biosynthetic process; cellular oxidant detoxification; glutathione metabolic process; protein targeting to peroxisome
Sources:Amigo / QuickGO
Orthologs
Species	Human	Mouse
Entrez	373156	76263
Ensembl	ENSG00000197448	ENSMUSG00000029864
UniProt	Q9Y2Q3	Q9DCM2
RefSeq (mRNA)	NM_015917; NM_001143679; NM_001143680; NM_001143681	NM_029555
RefSeq (protein)	NP_001137151; NP_001137152; NP_001137153; NP_057001	NP_083831
Location (UCSC)	Chr 7: 143.24 – 143.27 Mb	Chr 6: 42.22 – 42.23 Mb
PubMed search
- Wikidata
View/Edit Human	View/Edit Mouse

Glutathione S-transferase kappa 1 (GSTK1) is an enzyme that in humans is encoded by the GSTK1 gene which is located on chromosome seven. It belongs to the superfamily of enzymes known as glutathione S-transferase (GST), which are mainly known for cellular detoxification. The GSTK1 gene consists of eight exons and seven introns and although it is a member of the GST family, its structure has been found to be similar to bacterial HCCA (2-hydroxychromene-2-carboxylate) isomerases and bacterial disulphide-bond-forming DsbA oxidoreductase. This similarity has later allowed the enzyme GSTK1 to be renamed to DsbA-L. Research has also suggested that several variations of the GSTK1 gene can be responsible for metabolic diseases and certain types of cancer.

== Structure ==
The GSTK1 enzyme is a homodimer and, like all GSTs, it contains a TRX-like domain and a helical domain. However, the GSTK1 is substantially different in its secondary structure compared to the other GSTs. The helical domain has been observed to be placed between the βαβ and ββα motifs of the TRX-like domain, rather than the TRX-like domain and the C-terminal helical domain being connected together by a short linker of alpha-helixes as normally seen in GSTs. Also, the GSTK1 dimer employs a butterfly shape and not a V-shaped crevice like in the other classes. As for the GSTK1 gene, it is ~5 kb long, has eight exons, is located on chromosome 7q34, and includes an initiator element at the transcription start site instead of a TATA or a CCAAT box.

== Function ==
GSTK1 has been suggested to promote adiponectin multimerization in the endoplasmic reticulum (ER), but this has been contradicted by later studies. GSTK1 can prevent ER stress and ER stress-induced adiponectin down-regulation, implying that GSTK1 assists the ER’s functions. GSTK1 is located in the ER and also in the mitochondria of hepatocytes. This indicates a potential role for GSTK1 in the interaction between the two organelles; though this is poorly understood.

The discovery of GSTK1 in the peroxisome has led to studies based on its function. It has been suggested that, similar to GSTA, GSTK1 may play a role in the buffering of acyl-CoA and xenobiotic-CoA and be involved in their binding activities. GSTK1 may also be responsible for the detoxification of lipid peroxides created in the peroxisome based on the peroxidase activity towards three substrates: tert-butyl hydroperoxide, cumene hydroperoxide, and 15-S-hydroperoxy-5,8,11,13-eicosatetraenoic acid.

== Clinical significance ==
The amount of expression of adiponectin has been observed to be related to diseases such as insulin resistance, obesity, and type 2 diabetes. Decreased amounts of the protein indicates that there is a higher probability of receiving said diseases. Because the GSTK1 is seen to play a role in the multimerization of adiponectin, this enzyme can regulate the concentration of adiponectin and thus enhance insulin sensitivity and protect against diabetes. Also, the GSTK1 gene is unregulated when it is inflicted with oxidative stress and are over expressed in many tumors leading to difficulties during cancer chemotherapy. Moreover, GSTK1 gene expression has been seen to increase significantly in correlation to drug resistance in tumor cells such as erythroleukemia and mammary adenocarcinoma suggesting that it, along with GSTP1 and GSTA4, could be responsible for the drug resistance.

GSTK1 can also be a potential tool to help investigate cancer. Tyrosine phosphorylated proteins are responsible for many of the cell functions such as the cell’s growth, division, adhesion, and motility. These activities are also very related to cancer and thus studying this protein could allow access to information which could classify tumors for prognosis and prediction. Due to GSTK1’s C-terminal SH2 domain, tyrosine phosphorylated proteins can bind to it and allow for easier detection to which the protein can be studied.

== Interactions ==
GSTK1 has been suggested to interact with:

- adiponectin
- Erol-Lα
