= Conj =

Conj may refer to:

== Linguistics ==
- Conjugation (grammar)
- Conjunction (grammar)
- __CONJ__ a part of speech tag

== Mathematics ==
- Conjugacy class, a partition of group into elements that share properties of a group.
- Conjugate (algebra), the image of an element in a quadratic extension field of a field K under the unique non-identity automorphism of the extended field that fixes K.
  - Complex conjugate, one half of a pair of complex numbers, both having the same real part, but with imaginary parts of equal magnitude and opposite signs.
    - conj, a function in programming languages such as C++ or MATLAB that computes the complex conjugate.

== See also ==
- Conjugation (disambiguation)
- Conjunction (disambiguation)
