= MAPEG family =

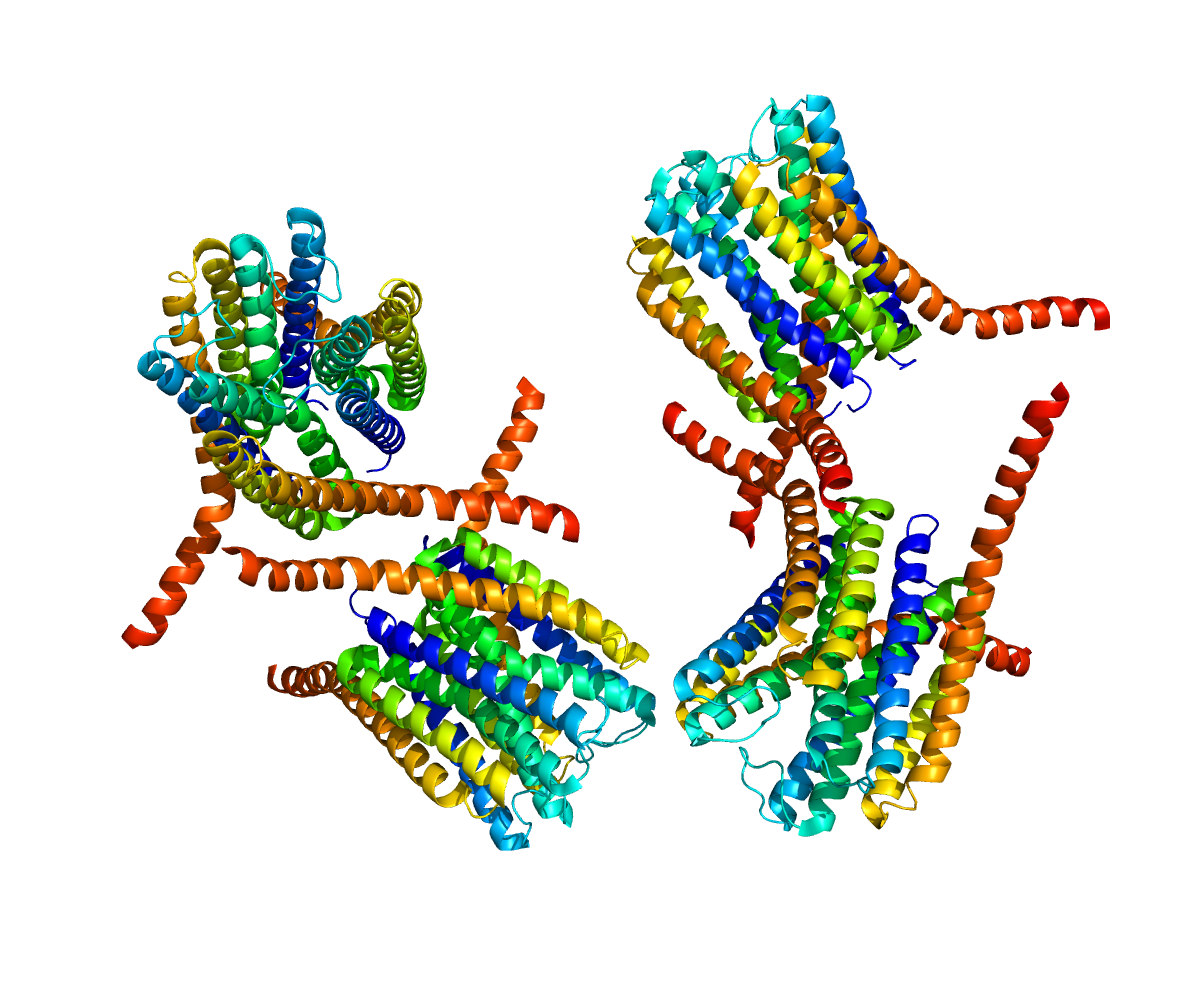
- Crystal structure of human leukotriene C4 synthase.

Identifiers
- Symbol: MAPEG
- Pfam: PF01124
- InterPro: IPR001129
- PROSITE: PS01297
- SCOP2: 2pno / SCOPe / SUPFAM
- OPM superfamily: 178
- OPM protein: 4yl3
Available protein structures:
- PDB: 2PNO IPR001129 PF01124 (ECOD; PDBsum)
- AlphaFold: IPR001129; PF01124

In molecular biology the MAPEG (Membrane-Associated Proteins in Eicosanoid and Glutathione metabolism) family of proteins are a group of membrane associated proteins with highly divergent functions. Included are the 5-lipoxygenase-activating protein (gene FLAP), leukotriene C4 synthase (EC 2.5.1.37), which catalyzes the production of leukotriene C4 (LTC4) from leukotriene A4 (LTA4), and microsomal glutathione S-transferase II (EC 2.5.1.18) (GST-II), which also produces LTC4 from LTA4.

Another example is prostaglandin E synthase. This enzyme catalyses the synthesis of PGE2 from PGH2 (produced by cyclooxygenase from arachidonic acid). Because of structural similarities in the active sites of FLAP, LTC4 synthase, and PGE synthase, substrates for each enzyme can compete with one another and modulate synthetic activity.

== Subfamilies ==
- 5-lipoxygenase-activating protein InterPro: IPR001129

== Human proteins containing this domain ==
- 5-lipoxygenase-activating protein (ALOX5AP))
- LTC4S
- MGST1
- MGST2
- MGST3
- PTGES
