= N-Sulfonylimine =

Class of chemical compounds

N-Sulfonylimine
R represents organic groups (alkyl group, aryl group, or similar) or hydrogen atoms.

N-Sulfonylimines are a class of compounds in organic chemistry. They are derivatives of imines in which the nitrogen atom is directly bonded to a sulfonyl group. Due to the strong electron-withdrawing effect of the sulfonyl group, they function as highly reactive electrophiles and serve as versatile synthons in organic synthesis.

== Structure and Properties ==
The general structural formula of N-sulfonylimines is R^{1}R^{2}C=N-SO_{2}R^{3}. Due to the strong inductive effect and mesomeric effect of the sulfonyl group, the C=N double bond is highly electron-deficient. This renders them excellent acceptors for nucleophilic addition and cycloaddition reactions, while also increasing the stability of the imine bond, making sulfonylimines more resistant to hydrolysis than typical imines. In contrast to often unstable acyl group analogues, N-sulfonylimines (especially those derived from aromatic aldehydes) are frequently stable and isolable. Nevertheless, N-sulfonylimines remain susceptible to hydrolysis. Consequently, the addition of water to the imine initially forms a hydroxymethyl group derivative, which can be remarkably stable in certain cases. However, this intermediate typically decomposes into an aldehyde and a primary sulfonamide. N-Sulfonylimines exhibit a characteristically low barrier to E/Z-isomerism, which is attributed to nitrogen inversion wherein (p-d)-π-conjugation between sulfur and nitrogen stabilizes the transition state for stereomutation.

== Synthesis and Preparation ==
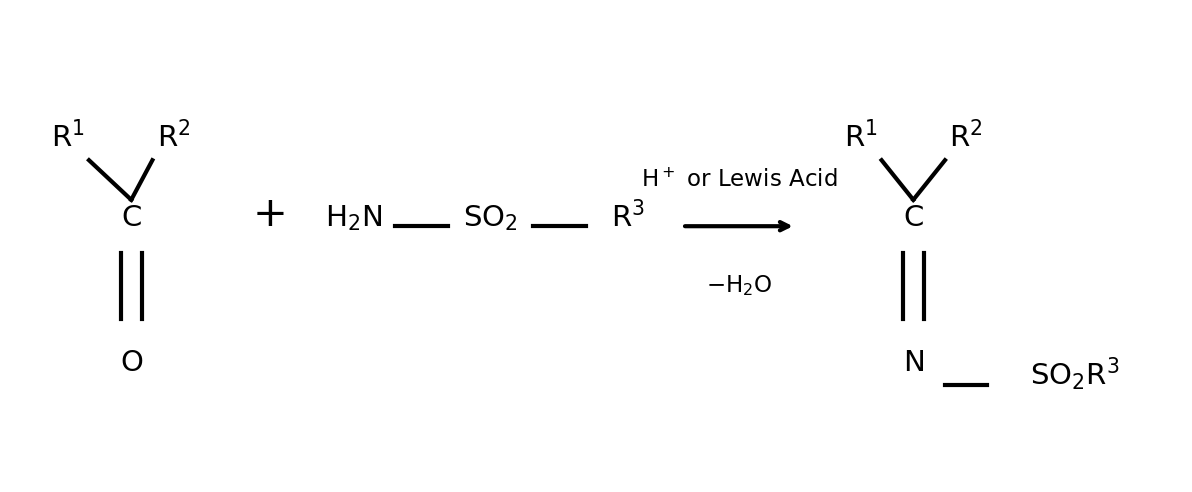
Synthesis of N-sulfonylimines.

Several methods have been established for the preparation of N-sulfonylimines. One common approach is the direct condensation of primary sulfonamides with aldehydes or ketones in the presence of catalysts such as titanium(IV) chloride or aluminum chloride. Heating a mixture of an arylsulfonamide with an ethyl or methyl acetal of an aromatic aldehyde also affords N-sulfonylimines in good yields. Furthermore, N-sulfinylsulfonamides can serve as starting materials for the synthesis of N-sulfonylimines. These N-sulfinylsulfonamides are generally straightforward to prepare from the corresponding sulfonamide and thionyl chloride. Studies have further shown that both N-sulfonylaldimines and N-sulfonylketimines can be prepared from the corresponding aldoximes or ketoximes. Additional methods for preparing N-sulfonylimines include the sulfonylation of imines and N-silylimines, the oxidation of sulfonamides, and the reduction of N-sulfonyl lactams. The reaction of aldehydes with compounds containing an amino group in the presence of pyrrolidine as a catalyst can also be utilized to synthesize N-sulfonylimines. Alternative synthetic methodologies have also been reported.

== Applications ==
N-Sulfonylimines are widely utilized in organic synthesis. For example, they serve as starting materials for the generation of chiral amines via the addition reaction of Grignard compounds or enolates. As electron-deficient dienophiles, they undergo Aza-Diels-Alder reactions to form nitrogen-containing heterocycles. They enable the formation of unsaturated amino acids via ene reactions and are employed in the cyclization of alkenes, a strategy widely utilized in the total synthesis of complex alkaloids such as anatoxin A or fredericamycin A. More broadly, N-sulfonylimines serve as key intermediates in the preparation of various heterocyclic compounds, such as sulfonyl-substituted azoles, oxazolidinones, and thiazoles, which represent core structural motifs in many pharmaceuticals.
