= Most common words in Turkish =

When studying the most commonly used words in Turkish, researchers rely on large-scale text corpora. One of the most comprehensive and academically respected of these is the Turkish National Corpus (TNC).

The TNC contains approximately 50 million words from texts written between 1990 and 2013, and has been constructed following the framework of the British National Corpus in its basic design and implementation. It covers a wide range of genres such as newspapers, magazines, academic articles, literary works, and miscellaneous texts.

== 100 most common words ==
A Frequency Dictionary of Turkish provides a list of the 5,000 most frequently used words in contemporary written and spoken Turkish, based on data from the Turkish National Corpus (TNC). Below is a subset of the top 100 words from this list. The table includes the part of speech, English equivalent, frequency statistics, and etymology for each word.

Word	TNC rank	Part of speech	English equivalent(s)	Frequency	Etymology
bir	1	Determiner, numeral, adverb	(d) a, an (num) one (ad) just	1402146	Turkish
ol	2	Verb	to be; to become	1312151	Turkish
ve	3	Conjunction	and	1178818	Arabic
bu	4	Pronoun, determiner	this	989142	Turkish
da	5	Particle	as well, too, also	881669	Turkish
et	6	Verb, noun	(v) to do, to make (n) meat; flesh	511423	Turkish
o	7	Pronoun, determiner	she / he / it (demonstrative) that	492063	Turkish
yap	8	Verb	to do, to make	358192	Turkish
de	9	Verb	to say	321612	Turkish
ben	10	Pronoun	I, me	316570	Turkish
al	11	Verb	to take, to buy	312199	Turkish
gel	12	Verb	to come	285485	Turkish
için	13	Postposition	for, as a result of	282208	Turkish
çok	14	Adverb, determiner	(adv) very (d) much, many, a lot	261699	Turkish
ne	15	Pronoun	what, whatever	243489	Turkish
ver	16	Verb	to give	236298	Turkish
gibi	17	Postposition	like	231717	Turkish
daha	18	Adverb	more, still	227608	Turkish
mi	19	Particle	question particle	225051	Turkish
kendi	20	Pronoun, adverb	self, own	218435	Turkish
gör	21	Verb	to see	216069	Turkish
var	22	Noun, verb	(n) there is, existent (v) to reach, to arrive at	211317	Turkish
ile	23	Postposition, conjunction	(posp) with (conj) and	202389	Turkish
çık	24	Verb	to go out (of)	198227	Turkish
sonra	25	Adverb	later, after	191249	Turkish
yer	26	Noun	place, ground	182309	Turkish
bul	27	Verb	to find	179439	Turkish
iç	28	Noun, verb	(n) inside (v) to drink	178382	Turkish
ama	29	Conjunction	but, yet, still	176269	Arabic
şey	30	Noun	thing	167699	Arabic
her	31	Determiner	each, every	160771	Persian
zaman	32	Noun	time	160656	Persian
git	33	Verb	to go	156933	Turkish
kadar	34	Postposition	until; as much as	154881	Arabic
yıl	35	Noun	year	154813	Turkish
ara	36	Noun, verb	(n) space; time (v) to look for, to search	152895	Turkish
çalış	37	Verb	to work	150234	Turkish
değil	38	Particle	not	149658	Turkish
en	39	Adverb, noun	(adv) the most (n) width	148762	Turkish
iste	40	Verb	to want	147628	Turkish
bil	41	Verb	to know	146004	Turkish
biz	42	Pronoun	we, us	143327	Turkish
geç	43	Verb, adverb	(v) to pass (adv) late	142923	Turkish
insan	44	Noun	human, person	140522	Arabic
gün	45	Noun	day	136776	Turkish
ya	46	Conjunction	either	134512	Persian
anla	47	Verb	to understand	134073	Turkish
bak	48	Verb	to look at	127182	Turkish
ki	49	Relative pronoun, conjunction	(p) that (conj) so that, anyways	126887	Persian
el	50	Noun	hand	124409	Turkish
yok	51	Noun, interjection	(n) absent, nonexistent (int) no	123810	Turkish
söyle	52	Verb	to say, to tell	123725	Turkish
kal	53	Verb	to stay, to remain	121834	Turkish
sen	54	Pronoun	you (singular, informal)	120946	Turkish
konu	55	Noun	topic, subject	117968	Turkish
ye	56	Verb	to eat	116309	Turkish
başla	57	Verb	to begin, to start	114750	Turkish
i	58	Verb	to be (defective copular verb)	114616	Turkish
yeni	59	Adjective	new	111485	Turkish
iş	60	Noun	work, job, business	105363	Turkish
önce	61	Adverb	before	102311	Turkish
son	62	Noun	last, end, conclusion	102207	Turkish
yan	63	Noun, verb	(n) side (v) to burn	100925	Turkish
üzeri	64	Noun	on, above	98790	Turkish
yaşa	65	Verb	to live	96717	Turkish
büyük	66	Adjective	big, large	95501	Turkish
baş	67	Noun	head	95481	Turkish
diye	68	Adverb	someone or something which is called; in order to; as	93854	Turkish
ülke	69	Noun	country	93600	Turkish
çocuk	70	Noun	child	93583	Turkish
yol	71	Noun, verb	(n) road, path (v) to pluck	92301	Turkish
neden	72	Noun, adverb	(n) reason (adv) why	91434	Turkish
kullan	73	Verb	to use	90836	Turkish
yüz	74	Noun, verb, numeral	(n) face (v) to swim (num) hundred	90361	Turkish
gerek	75	Verb, noun	(v) to be necessary (n) necessity	86896	Turkish
dünya	76	Noun	world, earth	86510	Arabic
gir	77	Verb	to enter	85569	Turkish
yani	78	Conjunction	in other words; well	84656	Arabic
durum	79	Noun	situation, condition	83987	Turkish
biri	80	Pronoun	someone, one of	83813	Turkish
orta	81	Noun	middle	83343	Turkish
böyle	82	Adverb	such, like this	83266	Turkish
düşün	83	Verb	to think	82875	Turkish
göre	84	Postposition	according to	82163	Turkish
iyi	85	Adjective	good	81848	Turkish
getir	86	Verb	to bring	79260	Turkish
ev	87	Noun	house, home	78019	Turkish
kadın	88	Noun	woman	77944	Turkish
yaz	89	Verb, noun	(v) to write (n) summer	77838	Turkish
göz	90	Noun	eye	77751	Turkish
taraf	91	Noun	side	77391	Arabic
aç	92	Verb, adjective	(v) to open (adj) hungry	76768	Turkish
alan	93	Noun, adjective	(n) area, field (adj) recipient	76651	Turkish
göster	94	Verb	to show	75484	Turkish
hiç	95	Adverb	never, nothing, any	74773	Persian
önemli	96	Adjective	important	74563	Turkish
oluş	97	Verb, noun	(v) to come into being (n) becoming, happening	73917	Turkish
hal	98	Noun	state, condition	73630	Arabic
siz	99	Pronoun	you (plural, formal singular)	73216	Turkish
konuş	100	Verb	to talk, to speak	71942	Turkish
