= Microsomal glutathione S-transferase 1 =

Protein-coding gene in the species Homo sapiens

MGST1

Identifiers
- Aliases: MGST1, GST12, MGST, MGST-I, microsomal glutathione S-transferase 1
- External IDs: OMIM: 138330; MGI: 1913850; HomoloGene: 10544; GeneCards: MGST1; OMA:MGST1 - orthologs

Gene location (Human)
Chr.	Chromosome 12 (human)
Band	12p12.3	Start	16,347,142 bp
Band	12p12.3	End	16,609,259 bp

Gene location (Mouse)
Chr.	Chromosome 6 (mouse)
Band	6|6 G1	Start	138,117,314 bp
Band	6|6 G1	End	138,133,753 bp
RNA expression pattern
Bgee	Human / Mouse (ortholog); Top expressed in: right adrenal gland; right adrenal cortex; left adrenal gland; left adrenal cortex; right lobe of liver; mucosa of ileum; adipose tissue; abdominal fat; subcutaneous adipose tissue; pericardium / Top expressed in: left lobe of liver; tunica adventitia of aorta; transitional epithelium of urinary bladder; right lung lobe; granulocyte; subcutaneous adipose tissue; white adipose tissue; intercostal muscle; brown adipose tissue; nose; More reference expression data
BioGPS	n/a
Gene ontology
Molecular function	transferase activity; identical protein binding; glutathione binding; protein homodimerization activity; glutathione peroxidase activity; protein binding; glutathione transferase activity; prostaglandin-E synthase activity
Cellular component	integral component of membrane; mitochondrion; nucleus; peroxisomal membrane; apical part of cell; intracellular membrane-bounded organelle; membrane; endoplasmic reticulum; endoplasmic reticulum membrane; mitochondrial outer membrane; plasma membrane; azurophil granule membrane
Biological process	xenobiotic metabolic process; response to lipopolysaccharide; protein homotrimerization; Leydig cell differentiation; cellular response to lipid hydroperoxide; glutathione derivative biosynthetic process; response to organonitrogen compound; cellular oxidant detoxification; neutrophil degranulation; prostaglandin biosynthetic process; glutathione metabolic process
Sources:Amigo / QuickGO
Orthologs
Species	Human	Mouse
Entrez	4257	56615
Ensembl	ENSG00000008394	ENSMUSG00000008540
UniProt	P10620	Q91VS7
RefSeq (mRNA)	NM_001260511; NM_001260512; NM_001267598; NM_020300; NM_145764 NM_145791; NM_145792	NM_019946; NM_001347489; NM_001361308; NM_001361309; NM_001361307
RefSeq (protein)	NP_001247440; NP_001247441; NP_001254527; NP_064696; NP_665707 NP_665734; NP_665735	NP_001334418; NP_064330; NP_001348237; NP_001348238; NP_001348236
Location (UCSC)	Chr 12: 16.35 – 16.61 Mb	Chr 6: 138.12 – 138.13 Mb
PubMed search
- Wikidata
View/Edit Human	View/Edit Mouse

Microsomal glutathione S-transferase 1 is an enzyme that in humans is encoded by the MGST1 gene.

== Function ==
The MAPEG family (Membrane-Associated Proteins in Eicosanoid and Glutathione metabolism) consists of six human proteins, two of which are involved in the production of leukotrienes and prostaglandin E, important mediators of inflammation. Other family members, demonstrating glutathione S-transferase and peroxidase activities, are involved in cellular defense against toxic, carcinogenic, and pharmacologically active electrophilic compounds. This gene encodes a protein that catalyzes the conjugation of glutathione to electrophiles and the reduction of lipid hydroperoxides. This protein is localized to the endoplasmic reticulum and outer mitochondrial membrane where it is thought to protect these membranes from oxidative stress. Four transcript variants of this gene encode one protein isoform.
