= Glutathione S-transferase Mu 1 =

Protein found in humans

GSTM1
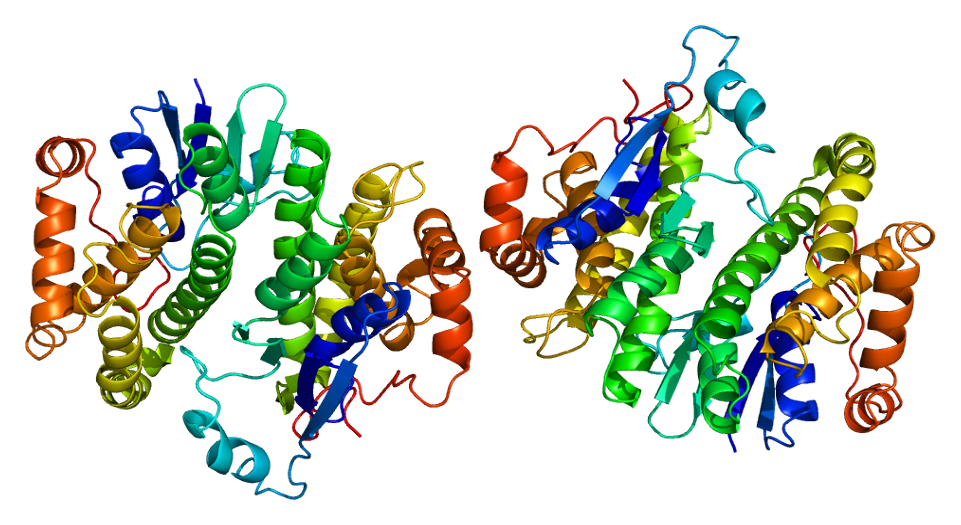

Identifiers
- Aliases: GSTM1, GST1, GSTM1-1, GSTM1a-1a, GSTM1b-1b, GTH4, GTM1, H-B, MU, MU-1, glutathione S-transferase mu 1
- External IDs: OMIM: 138350; MGI: 95861; GeneCards: GSTM1
Available structures
PDB	Ortholog search: PDBe RCSB
PDB	List of PDB id codes 1GTU, 1XW6, 1XWK, 1YJ6, 2F3M
Enzyme activity
EC #	BRENDA	ExPASy	KEGG	MetaCyc
2.5.1.18	↗	↗	↗	↗

Gene location (Human)
Chr.	Chromosome 1 (human)
Band	1p13.3	Start	109,687,814 bp
Band	1p13.3	End	109,709,039 bp

Gene location (Mouse)
Chr.	Chromosome 3 (mouse)
Band	3|3 F2.3	Start	107,889,018 bp
Band	3|3 F2.3	End	107,893,769 bp
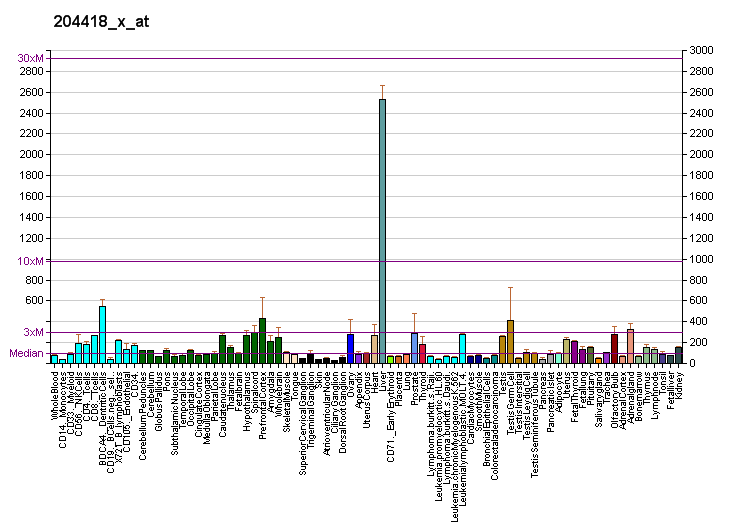

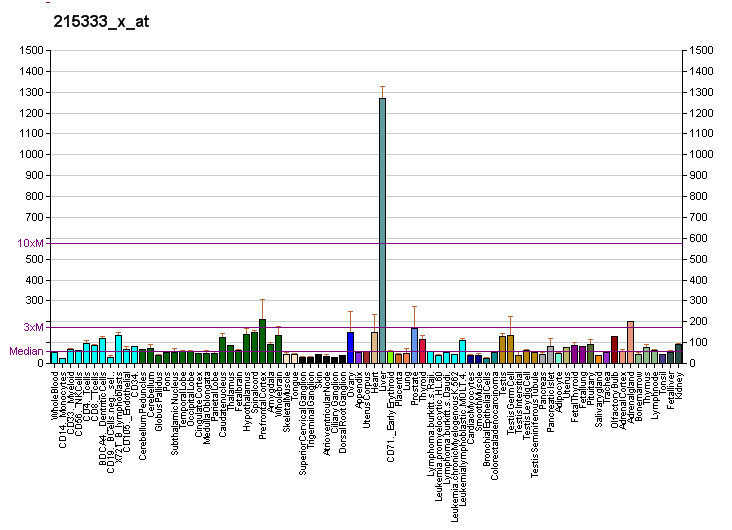

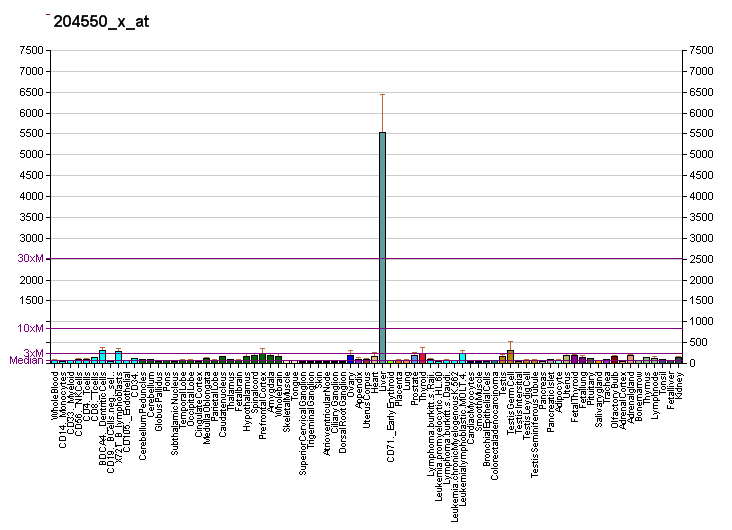
RNA expression pattern
Bgee	Human / Mouse (ortholog); Top expressed in: smooth muscle tissue; gastric mucosa; mucosa of transverse colon; apex of heart; left uterine tube; testicle; duodenum; anterior pituitary; right lobe of liver; right ovary / Top expressed in: uterus; ovary; adrenal gland; white adipose tissue; esophagus; urinary bladder; lung; muscle of thigh; stomach; testicle; More reference expression data
BioGPS	More reference expression data
Gene ontology
Molecular function	enzyme binding; glutathione binding; protein homodimerization activity; transferase activity; glutathione transferase activity
Cellular component	cytoplasm; cytosol; intercellular bridge
Biological process	xenobiotic catabolic process; nitrobenzene metabolic process; cellular detoxification of nitrogen compound; glutathione metabolic process; metabolism; glutathione derivative biosynthetic process
Sources:Amigo / QuickGO
Orthologs
Databases	NCBI: entry; OMA: entry
Species	Human	Mouse
Entrez	2944	14863
Ensembl	ENSG00000134184	ENSMUSG00000040562
UniProt	P09488	P15626
RefSeq (mRNA)	NM_000561; NM_146421	NM_008183
RefSeq (protein)	NP_000552; NP_666533	NP_032209
Location (UCSC)	Chr 1: 109.69 – 109.71 Mb	Chr 3: 107.89 – 107.89 Mb
PubMed search
- Wikidata
View/Edit Human	View/Edit Mouse

Glutathione S-transferase Mu 1 (gene name GSTM1) is a human glutathione S-transferase.

== Function ==
Cytosolic and membrane-bound forms of glutathione S-transferase are encoded by two distinct supergene families. At present, eight distinct classes of the soluble cytoplasmic mammalian glutathione S-transferases have been identified: alpha, kappa, mu, omega, pi, sigma, theta and zeta. This gene encodes a cytoplasmic glutathione S-transferase that belongs to the mu class. The mu class of enzymes functions in the detoxification of electrophilic compounds, including carcinogens, therapeutic drugs, environmental toxins, and products of oxidative stress, by conjugation with glutathione.

The genes encoding the mu class of enzymes are organized in a gene cluster on chromosome 1p13.3, and are known to be highly polymorphic. These genetic variations can change an individual's susceptibility to carcinogens and toxins, as well as affect the toxicity and efficacy of certain drugs. Null mutations of this class mu gene have been linked with an increase in a number of cancers, likely due to an increased susceptibility to environmental toxins and carcinogens. Multiple protein isoforms are encoded by transcript variants of this gene.

== See also ==
- Biliary atresia
