= Piperlongumine =

Names
- Preferred IUPAC name 1-[(2E)-3-(3,4,5-Trimethoxyphenyl)prop-2-enoyl]-5,6-dihydropyridin-2(1H)-one
- Other names Piplartine

Identifiers
CAS Number	20069-09-4
3D model (JSmol)	Interactive image
ChEMBL	ChEMBL465843
ChemSpider	553441
ECHA InfoCard	100.243.690
PubChem CID	637858
UNII	SGD66V4SVJ
CompTox Dashboard (EPA)	DTXSID801029762
- InChI: InChI=1S/C17H19NO5/c1-21-13-10-12(11-14(22-2)17(13)23-3)7-8-16(20)18-9-5-4-6-15(18)19/h4,6-8,10-11H,5,9H2,1-3H3/b8-7+ Key: VABYUUZNAVQNPG-BQYQJAHWSA-N
- SMILES: O=C2\C=C/CCN2C(=O)\C=C\c1cc(OC)c(OC)c(OC)c1

Properties
Chemical formula	C_{17}H_{19}NO_{5}
Molar mass	317.341 g·mol^{−1}
Solubility	DMSO, DMF, ethanol

Hazards
- GHS labelling
Pictograms	(GHS07: Exclamation mark)
Signal word	Warning
Hazard statements	H315, H319, H335
Precautionary statements	P261, P264, P280
- Safety data sheet (SDS)
- Except where otherwise noted, data are given for materials in their standard state (at 25 °C [77 °F], 100 kPa). verify (what is ?) Infobox references

Piperlongumine (also called piplartine or piperlongumin) is an amide alkaloid constituent of the fruit of the long pepper (Piper longum), a pepper plant found in southern India and southeast Asia. When extracted, piperlongumine may cause skin, eye or respiratory tract irritation.

== Traditional medicine and research ==
Long peppers have been used in Ayurveda and traditional Chinese medicine as a treatment.

Targtex, a biotechnology spin-off of the Portuguese Institute for Molecular Biology, developed a piperlongumine hydrogel that is to be applied after the removal of Glioblastoma tumours, with the goal of neutralizing remaining cancer cells. The hydrogel was effective in laboratory and animal studies and is scheduled for Phase I human clinical trials sometime in 2023.
