= GSTM2 =

Protein-coding gene in humans

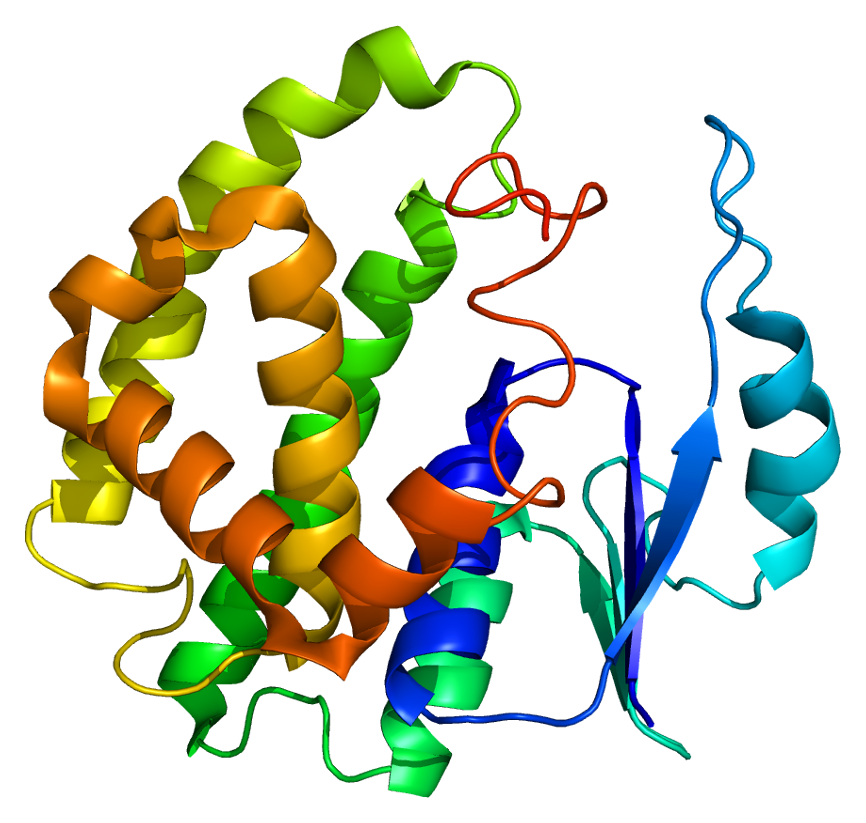

Identifiers
- Aliases: GSTM2, GST4, GSTM, GSTM2-2, GTHMUS, glutathione S-transferase mu 2 (muscle), glutathione S-transferase mu 2
- External IDs: OMIM: 138380; MGI: 1915562; GeneCards: GSTM2
Available structures
PDB	Ortholog search: PDBe RCSB
PDB	List of PDB id codes 1HNA, 1HNB, 1HNC, 1XW5, 1YKC, 2AB6, 2C4J, 2GTU, 3GTU, 3GUR
Enzyme activity
EC #	BRENDA	ExPASy	KEGG	MetaCyc
2.5.1.18	↗	↗	↗	↗

Gene location (Human)
Chr.	Chromosome 1 (human)
Band	1p13.3	Start	109,668,022 bp
Band	1p13.3	End	109,709,551 bp

Gene location (Mouse)
Chr.	Chromosome 3 (mouse)
Band	3|3 F2.3	Start	107,833,650 bp
Band	3|3 F2.3	End	107,839,133 bp
RNA expression pattern
Bgee	Human / Mouse (ortholog); Top expressed in: left ovary; right uterine tube; right ovary; fundus; pituitary gland; tibial nerve; vagina; anterior pituitary; prostate; muscle layer of sigmoid colon / Top expressed in: efferent ductule; interventricular septum; left lobe of liver; lumbar subsegment of spinal cord; Gonadal ridge; lens; right ventricle; ganglionic eminence; testicle; adrenal gland; More reference expression data
BioGPS	n/a
Gene ontology
Molecular function	transferase activity; protein homodimerization activity; glutathione binding; protein binding; enzyme binding; signaling receptor binding; glutathione peroxidase activity; glutathione transferase activity
Cellular component	cytoplasm; cytosol; sarcoplasmic reticulum; extracellular exosome; intercellular bridge
Biological process	xenobiotic catabolic process; glutathione metabolic process; regulation of cardiac muscle contraction by regulation of the release of sequestered calcium ion; negative regulation of ryanodine-sensitive calcium-release channel activity; positive regulation of ryanodine-sensitive calcium-release channel activity; cellular detoxification of nitrogen compound; nitrobenzene metabolic process; cellular response to caffeine; metabolism; regulation of release of sequestered calcium ion into cytosol by sarcoplasmic reticulum; relaxation of cardiac muscle; glutathione derivative biosynthetic process; regulation of skeletal muscle contraction by regulation of release of sequestered calcium ion; cellular oxidant detoxification; linoleic acid metabolic process
Sources:Amigo / QuickGO
Orthologs
Databases	NCBI: entry; OMA: entry
Species	Human	Mouse
Entrez	2946	68312
Ensembl	ENSG00000213366	ENSMUSG00000004035
UniProt	P28161	Q80W21
RefSeq (mRNA)	NM_001142368; NM_000848	NM_026672; NM_001356351
RefSeq (protein)	NP_000839; NP_001135840	NP_080948; NP_001343280
Location (UCSC)	Chr 1: 109.67 – 109.71 Mb	Chr 3: 107.83 – 107.84 Mb
PubMed search
- Wikidata
View/Edit Human	View/Edit Mouse

Glutathione S-transferase Mu 2 is an enzyme that in humans is encoded by the GSTM2 gene.

Cytosolic and membrane-bound forms of glutathione S-transferase are encoded by two distinct supergene families. At present, eight distinct classes of the soluble cytoplasmic mammalian glutathione S-transferases have been identified: alpha, kappa, mu, omega, pi, sigma, theta and zeta.

This gene encodes a glutathione S-transferase that belongs to the mu class. The mu class of enzymes functions in the detoxification of electrophilic compounds, including carcinogens, therapeutic drugs, environmental toxins and products of oxidative stress, by conjugation with glutathione. The genes encoding the mu class of enzymes are organized in a gene cluster on chromosome 1p13.3 and are known to be highly polymorphic. These genetic variations can change an individual's susceptibility to carcinogens and toxins as well as affect the toxicity and efficacy of certain drugs.
