= Conjugal rights =

Conjugal rights may refer to:

- Rights in marriage, related to conjugal responsibilities
- Conjugal visits
- Restitution of conjugal rights
