= GSTP1 =

Protein-coding gene in the species Homo sapiens

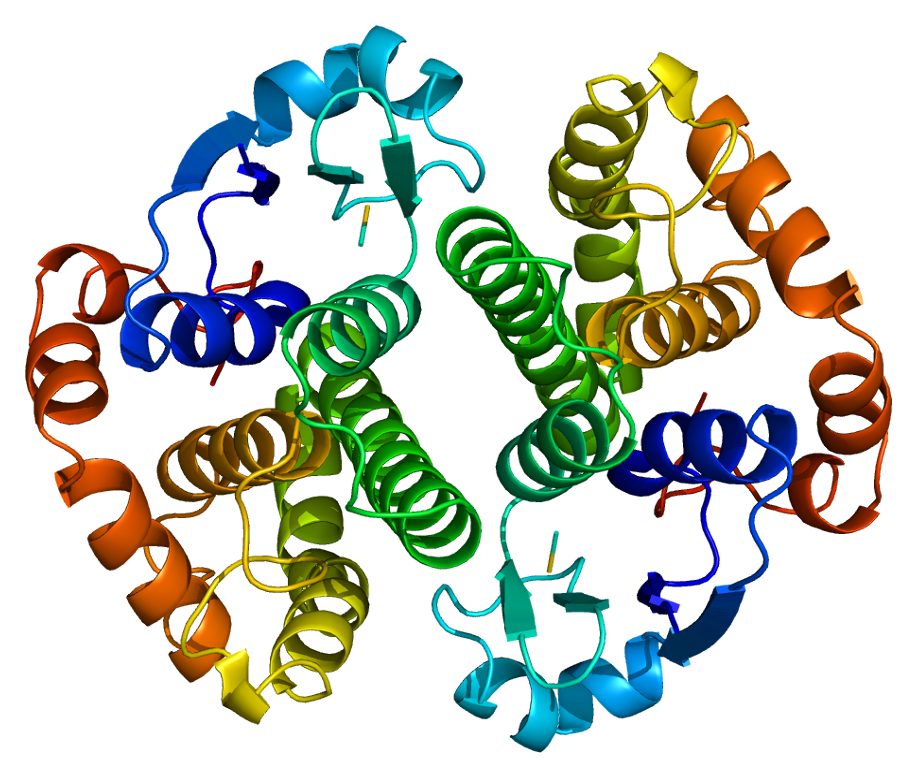
Available structures
| PDB | Human UniProt search: PDBe RCSB |
| PDB | List of PDB id codes 10GS, 11GS, 12GS, 13GS, 14GS, 16GS, 17GS, 18GS, 19GS, 1AQV, 1AQW, 1AQX, 1EOG, 1EOH, 1GSS, 1KBN, 1LBK, 1MD3, 1MD4, 1PGT, 1PX6, 1PX7, 1ZGN, 20GS, 22GS, 2A2R, 2A2S, 2GSS, 2J9H, 2PGT, 3CSH, 3CSI, 3CSJ, 3DD3, 3DGQ, 3GSS, 3GUS, 3HJM, 3HJO, 3HKR, 3IE3, 3KM6, 3KMN, 3KMO, 3N9J, 3PGT, 4GSS, 4PGT, 5GSS, 6GSS, 7GSS, 8GSS, 9GSS |

Identifiers
- Aliases: GSTP1, DFN7, FAEES3, GST3, GSTP, HEL-S-22, PI, glutathione S-transferase pi 1
- External IDs: OMIM: 134660; MGI: 3782108; HomoloGene: 660; GeneCards: GSTP1; OMA:GSTP1 - orthologs

Gene location (Human)
| Chr. | Chromosome 11 (human) |
| Band | 11q13.2 | Start | 67,583,742 bp |
| Band | 11q13.2 | End | 67,586,656 bp |
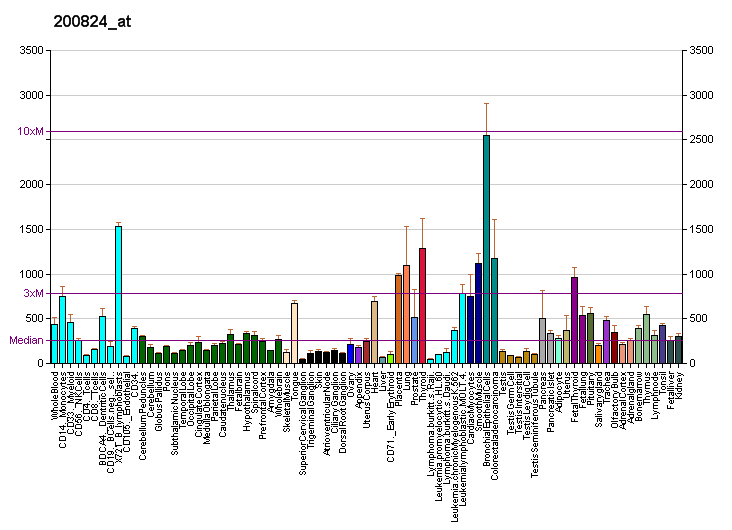
RNA expression pattern
| Bgee | Human / Mouse (ortholog); Top expressed in: right uterine tube; olfactory zone of nasal mucosa; right lobe of thyroid gland; left lobe of thyroid gland; ectocervix; skin of abdomen; skin of leg; right lung; upper lobe of left lung; anterior pituitary / n/a; More reference expression data |
| BioGPS | More reference expression data |
Gene ontology
| Molecular function | transferase activity; JUN kinase binding; kinase regulator activity; glutathione binding; nitric oxide binding; protein binding; S-nitrosoglutathione binding; dinitrosyl-iron complex binding; glutathione transferase activity; protein kinase binding; glutathione peroxidase activity |
| Cellular component | vesicle; TRAF2-GSTP1 complex; plasma membrane; intracellular anatomical structure; mitochondrion; extracellular exosome; nucleus; extracellular region; extracellular space; cytoplasm; cytosol; secretory granule lumen; ficolin-1-rich granule lumen |
| Biological process | negative regulation of monocyte chemotactic protein-1 production; cellular response to cell-matrix adhesion; response to amino acid; response to estradiol; negative regulation of interleukin-1 beta production; negative regulation of acute inflammatory response; glutathione metabolic process; negative regulation of tumor necrosis factor-mediated signaling pathway; negative regulation of leukocyte proliferation; common myeloid progenitor cell proliferation; nitric oxide storage; negative regulation of extrinsic apoptotic signaling pathway; negative regulation of apoptotic process; response to L-ascorbic acid; negative regulation of I-kappaB kinase/NF-kappaB signaling; cellular response to epidermal growth factor stimulus; central nervous system development; cellular response to glucocorticoid stimulus; response to nutrient levels; negative regulation of MAP kinase activity; animal organ regeneration; regulation of ERK1 and ERK2 cascade; cellular response to insulin stimulus; negative regulation of MAPK cascade; negative regulation of ERK1 and ERK2 cascade; negative regulation of stress-activated MAPK cascade; oligodendrocyte development; positive regulation of superoxide anion generation; negative regulation of tumor necrosis factor production; metabolism; response to ethanol; cellular response to lipopolysaccharide; negative regulation of JUN kinase activity; negative regulation of fibroblast proliferation; negative regulation of nitric-oxide synthase biosynthetic process; glutathione derivative biosynthetic process; response to toxic substance; regulation of stress-activated MAPK cascade; negative regulation of biosynthetic process; cellular oxidant detoxification; negative regulation of protein kinase activity; xenobiotic metabolic process; negative regulation of smooth muscle cell chemotaxis; linoleic acid metabolic process; negative regulation of vascular associated smooth muscle cell proliferation; neutrophil degranulation; response to reactive oxygen species; cellular response to oxidative stress; xenobiotic catabolic process |
Sources:Amigo / QuickGO
Orthologs
| Species | Human | Mouse |
| Entrez | 2950 | 100042625 |
| Ensembl | ENSG00000084207 | n/a |
| UniProt | P09211 | n/a |
| RefSeq (mRNA) | NM_000852 | XM_036155425 |
| RefSeq (protein) | NP_000843 | n/a |
| Location (UCSC) | Chr 11: 67.58 – 67.59 Mb | n/a |
| PubMed search |
- Wikidata
| View/Edit Human | View/Edit Mouse |

Glutathione S-transferase P is an enzyme that in humans is encoded by the GSTP1 gene.

== Function ==
Glutathione S-transferases (GSTs) are a family of enzymes that play an important role in detoxification by catalyzing the conjugation of many hydrophobic and electrophilic compounds with reduced glutathione. Based on their biochemical, immunologic, and structural properties, the soluble GSTs are categorized into four main classes: alpha, mu, pi, and theta. The glutathione S-transferase pi gene (GSTP1) is a polymorphic gene encoding active, functionally different GSTP1 variant proteins that are thought to function in xenobiotic metabolism and play a role in susceptibility to cancer, and other diseases.

== Interactions ==
GSTP1 has been shown to interact with Fanconi anemia, complementation group C and MAPK8.

GST-Pi is expressed in many human tissues, particularly in the biliary tree, renal distal convoluted tubules and lungs.

== Possible drug target ==
Triple-negative breast cancer cells rely on glutathione-S-transferase Pi1, and inhibitors are being studied. Piperlongumine has been found to silence the gene.
