= 2-hydroxychromene-2-carboxylate isomerase =

Class of enzymes

Identifiers
- EC no.: 5.99.1.4

Databases
- IntEnz: IntEnz view
- BRENDA: BRENDA entry
- ExPASy: NiceZyme view
- KEGG: KEGG entry
- MetaCyc: metabolic pathway
- PRIAM: profile
- PDB structures: RCSB PDB PDBe PDBsum
Search
- PMC: articles
- PubMed: articles
- NCBI: proteins

2-hydroxychromene-2-carboxylate isomerase (EC 5.99.1.4, HCCA isomerase, 2HC2CA isomerase, 2-hydroxychromene-2-carboxylic acid isomerase) is an enzyme with systematic name 2-hydroxy-2H-chromene-2-carboxylate---(3E)-4-(2-hydroxyphenyl)-2-oxobut-3-enoate isomerase. This enzyme catalyses the following chemical reaction

2-hydroxy-2H-chromene-2-carboxylate $\rightleftharpoons$ (3E)-4-(2-hydroxyphenyl)-2-oxobut-3-enoate

This enzyme is involved in naphthalene degradation.
