= GSTM3 =

Protein found in humans

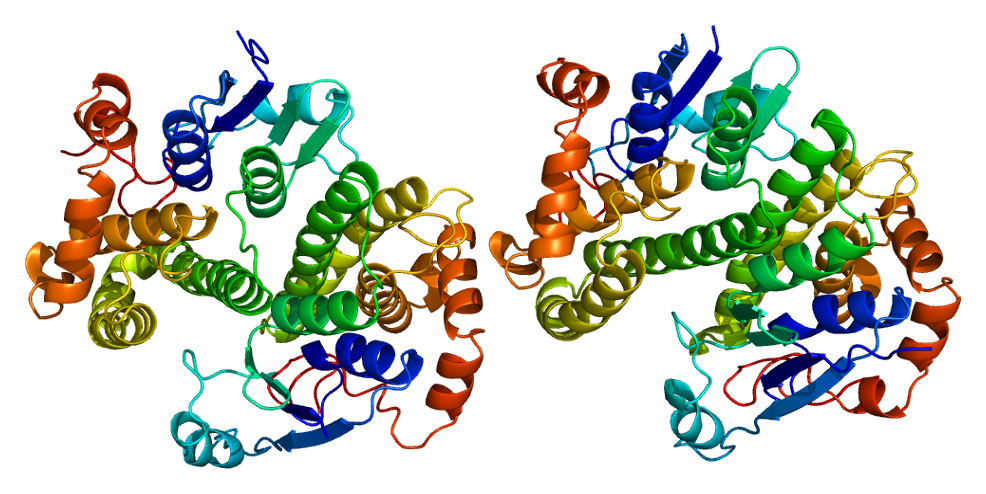

Identifiers
- Aliases: GSTM3, GST5, GSTB, GSTM3-3, GTM3, glutathione S-transferase mu 3 (brain), glutathione S-transferase mu 3
- External IDs: OMIM: 138390; MGI: 1309466; GeneCards: GSTM3
Available structures
PDB	Ortholog search: PDBe RCSB
PDB	List of PDB id codes 3GTU
Enzyme activity
EC #	BRENDA	ExPASy	KEGG	MetaCyc
2.5.1.18	↗	↗	↗	↗

Gene location (Human)
Chr.	Chromosome 1 (human)
Band	1p13.3	Start	109,733,932 bp
Band	1p13.3	End	109,741,038 bp

Gene location (Mouse)
Chr.	Chromosome 3 (mouse)
Band	3|3 F2.3	Start	107,803,137 bp
Band	3|3 F2.3	End	107,806,002 bp
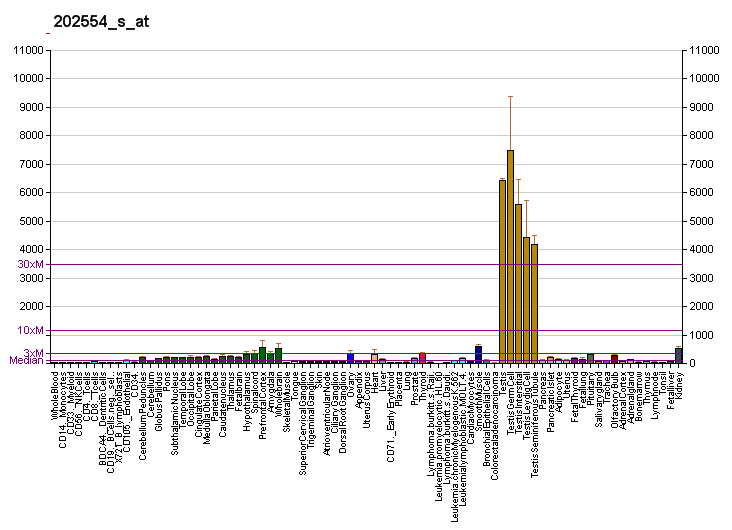
RNA expression pattern
Bgee	Human / Mouse (ortholog); Top expressed in: right testis; left testis; male germ cell; sperm; seminal vesicula; corpus epididymis; renal medulla; right ovary; left ovary; apex of heart / Top expressed in: seminiferous tubule; spermatid; efferent ductule; spermatocyte; CA3 field; olfactory epithelium; entorhinal cortex; perirhinal cortex; choroid plexus of fourth ventricle; optic nerve; More reference expression data
BioGPS	More reference expression data
Gene ontology
Molecular function	transferase activity; enzyme binding; glutathione transferase activity; protein homodimerization activity; glutathione binding; identical protein binding; protein binding
Cellular component	cytoplasm; cytosol; sperm fibrous sheath; extracellular exosome; nucleus; intercellular bridge
Biological process	cellular detoxification of nitrogen compound; metabolism; nitrobenzene metabolic process; xenobiotic catabolic process; glutathione derivative biosynthetic process; glutathione metabolic process; response to estrogen; establishment of blood-nerve barrier
Sources:Amigo / QuickGO
Orthologs
Databases	NCBI: entry; OMA: entry
Species	Human	Mouse
Entrez	2947	14866
Ensembl	ENSG00000134202	ENSMUSG00000004032
UniProt	P21266; Q6FGJ9	P48774
RefSeq (mRNA)	NM_000849	NM_010360
RefSeq (protein)	NP_000840; NP_000840.2	NP_034490
Location (UCSC)	Chr 1: 109.73 – 109.74 Mb	Chr 3: 107.8 – 107.81 Mb
PubMed search
- Wikidata
View/Edit Human	View/Edit Mouse

Glutathione S-transferase M3 (brain), also known as GSTM3, is an enzyme which in humans is encoded by the GSTM99 gene.

== Function ==
Cytosolic and membrane-bound forms of glutathione S-transferase are encoded by two distinct supergene families. At present, eight distinct classes of the soluble cytoplasmic mammalian glutathione S-transferases have been identified: alpha, kappa, mu, omega, pi, sigma, theta, and zeta. This gene encodes a glutathione S-transferase that belongs to the mu class. The mu class of enzymes functions in the detoxification of electrophilic compounds, including some carcinogens, therapeutic drugs, environmental toxins and products of oxidative stress, by conjugation with glutathione. The genes encoding the mu class of enzymes are organized in a gene cluster on chromosome 1p13.3 and are known to be highly polymorphic. These genetic variations can change an individual's susceptibility to carcinogens and toxins as well as affect the toxicity and efficacy of certain drugs. Mutations of this class mu gene have been linked with a slight increase in a number of cancers, likely due to exposure with environmental toxins.
