= GSTO2 =

Protein-coding gene in the species Homo sapiens

Available structures
PDB	Ortholog search: PDBe RCSB
PDB	List of PDB id codes 3Q18, 3Q19, 3QAG

Identifiers
- Aliases: GSTO2, GSTO 2-2, bA127L20.1, glutathione S-transferase omega 2
- External IDs: OMIM: 612314; MGI: 1915464; HomoloGene: 57057; GeneCards: GSTO2; OMA:GSTO2 - orthologs
- EC number: 1.8.5.1

Gene location (Human)
Chr.	Chromosome 10 (human)
Band	10q25.1	Start	104,268,873 bp
Band	10q25.1	End	104,304,950 bp

Gene location (Mouse)
Chr.	Chromosome 19 (mouse)
Band	19|19 D1	Start	47,853,973 bp
Band	19|19 D1	End	47,874,763 bp
RNA expression pattern
Bgee	Human / Mouse (ortholog); Top expressed in: body of pancreas; skin of arm; islet of Langerhans; skin of abdomen; right testis; right uterine tube; left testis; skin of leg; anterior pituitary; pancreatic ductal cell / Top expressed in: spermatid; spermatocyte; seminiferous tubule; hair; morula; embryo; embryo; thyroid gland; brown adipose tissue; transitional epithelium of urinary bladder; More reference expression data
BioGPS	n/a
Gene ontology
Molecular function	transferase activity; oxidoreductase activity; methylarsonate reductase activity; protein binding; glutathione dehydrogenase (ascorbate) activity; identical protein binding; glutathione transferase activity
Cellular component	cytosol; extracellular exosome; cytoplasm
Biological process	metabolism; cellular response to arsenic-containing substance; glutathione derivative biosynthetic process; L-ascorbic acid metabolic process; xenobiotic metabolic process; cellular oxidant detoxification; glutathione metabolic process; toxin catabolic process
Sources:Amigo / QuickGO
Orthologs
Species	Human	Mouse
Entrez	119391	68214
Ensembl	ENSG00000065621	ENSMUSG00000025069
UniProt	Q9H4Y5	Q8K2Q2
RefSeq (mRNA)	NM_001191013; NM_001191014; NM_001191015; NM_183239	NM_026619; NM_030051
RefSeq (protein)	NP_001177942; NP_001177943; NP_001177944; NP_899062	NP_080895; NP_084327
Location (UCSC)	Chr 10: 104.27 – 104.3 Mb	Chr 19: 47.85 – 47.87 Mb
PubMed search
- Wikidata
View/Edit Human	View/Edit Mouse

Glutathione S-transferase omega-2 is an enzyme that in humans is encoded by the GSTO2 gene.
