= GSTA4 =

Protein-coding gene in the species Homo sapiens

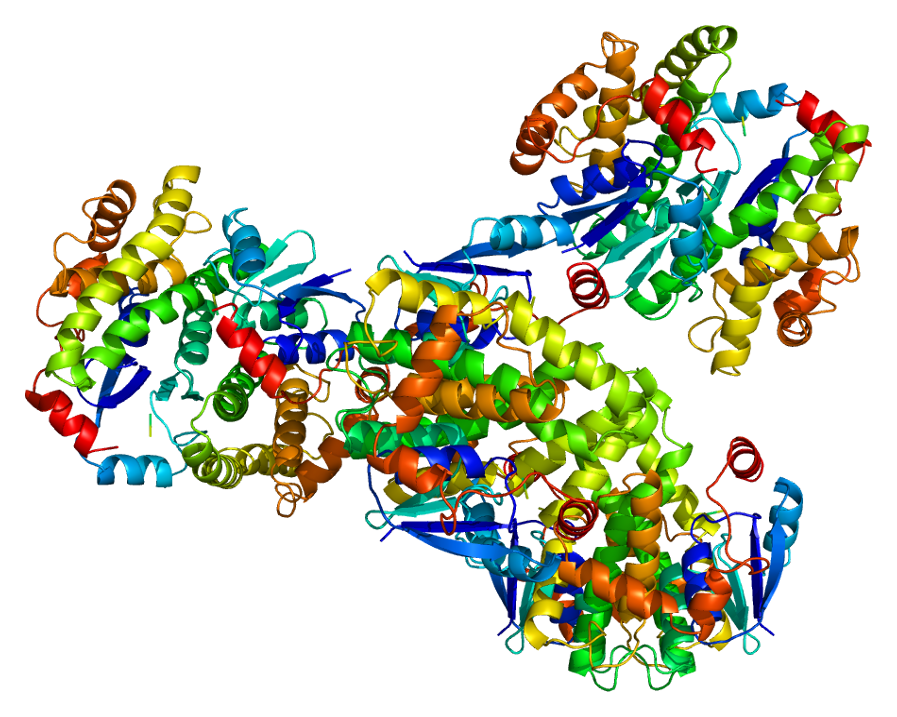
Available structures
PDB	Human UniProt search: PDBe RCSB
PDB	List of PDB id codes 1GUL, 1GUM, 3IK7

Identifiers
- Aliases: GSTA4, GSTA4-4, GTA4, glutathione S-transferase alpha 4
- External IDs: OMIM: 605450; HomoloGene: 55585; GeneCards: GSTA4; OMA:GSTA4 - orthologs

Gene location (Human)
Chr.	Chromosome 6 (human)
Band	6p12.2	Start	52,977,948 bp
Band	6p12.2	End	52,995,304 bp
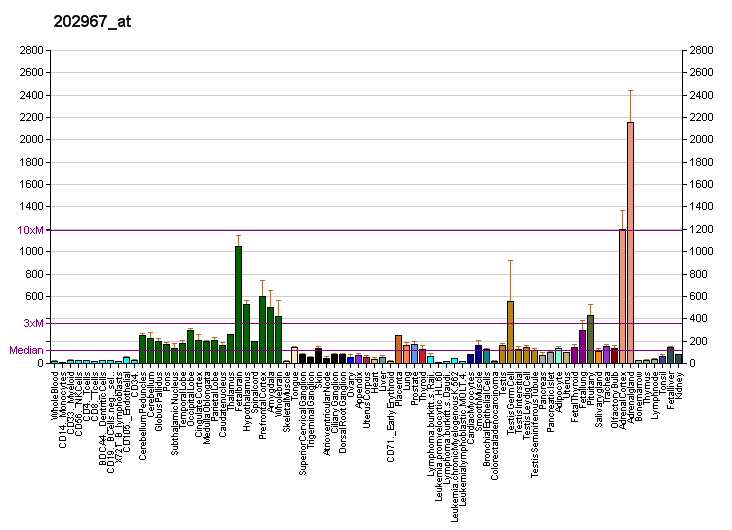
RNA expression pattern
Bgee	Human / Mouse (ortholog); Top expressed in: right adrenal gland; right adrenal cortex; left adrenal gland; left adrenal cortex; ganglionic eminence; vulva; skin of thigh; human penis; cerebellar hemisphere; right hemisphere of cerebellum / n/a; More reference expression data
BioGPS	More reference expression data
Gene ontology
Molecular function	transferase activity; glutathione transferase activity; protein binding; protein homodimerization activity; identical protein binding
Cellular component	cytoplasm; cytosol
Biological process	metabolism; glutathione derivative biosynthetic process; glutathione metabolic process; xenobiotic metabolic process
Sources:Amigo / QuickGO
Orthologs
Species	Human	Mouse
Entrez	2941	n/a
Ensembl	ENSG00000170899	n/a
UniProt	O15217	n/a
RefSeq (mRNA)	NM_001512	n/a
RefSeq (protein)	NP_001503	n/a
Location (UCSC)	Chr 6: 52.98 – 53 Mb	n/a
PubMed search		n/a
- Wikidata
View/Edit Human

Glutathione S-transferase A4, also known as GSTA4, is an enzyme which in humans is encoded by the GSTA4 gene.

== Function ==
Cytosolic and membrane-bound forms of glutathione S-transferase are encoded by two distinct supergene families. These enzymes are involved in cellular defense against toxic, carcinogenic, and pharmacologically active electrophilic compounds. At present, eight distinct classes of the soluble cytoplasmic mammalian glutathione S-transferases have been identified: alpha, kappa, mu, omega, pi, sigma, theta and zeta. This gene encodes a glutathione S-transferase belonging to the alpha class. The alpha class genes, which are located in a cluster on chromosome 6, are highly related and encode enzymes with glutathione peroxidase activity that function in the detoxification of lipid peroxidation products.

GSTA4 shows very high activity with reactive carbonyl compounds such as alk-2-enals. GSTA4 is highly effective in catalyzing the conjugate addition of reduced glutathione to 4-hydroxynonenal, an important product of peroxidative degradation of arachidonic acid and a commonly used biomarker for oxidative damage in tissue.

== Clinical significance ==
Reactive electrophiles produced by oxidative metabolism have been linked to a number of degenerative diseases including Parkinson's disease, Alzheimer's disease, cataract formation, and atherosclerosis hence reduced expression of the GSTA4 enzyme may have pathophysiological consequences. The expression of this gene is decreased drastically among burn and trauma victims.
