= GSTT1 =

Protein-coding gene in the species Homo sapiens

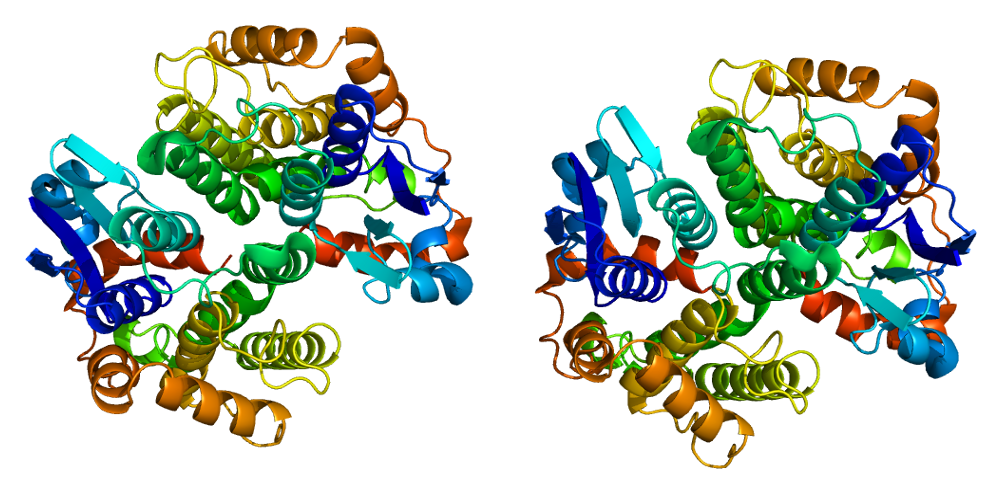
Available structures
PDB	Human UniProt search: PDBe RCSB
PDB	List of PDB id codes 2C3N, 2C3Q, 2C3T

Identifiers
- Aliases: GSTT1, glutathione S-transferase theta 1
- External IDs: OMIM: 600436; GeneCards: GSTT1; OMA:GSTT1 - orthologs

Gene location (Human)
Chr.	Chromosome 22 (human)
Band	22q11.23	Start	24,376,133 bp
Band	22q11.23	End	24,384,680 bp
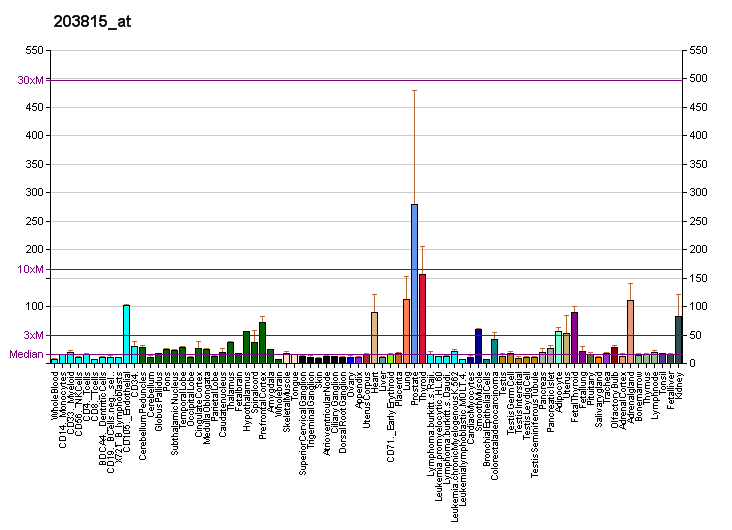
RNA expression pattern
Bgee	Human / Mouse (ortholog); Top expressed in: vena cava; thoracic diaphragm; adrenal gland; external globus pallidus; jejunal mucosa; right ventricle; coronary artery; Skeletal muscle tissue of rectus abdominis; lateral nuclear group of thalamus; cingulate gyrus / n/a; More reference expression data
BioGPS	More reference expression data
Gene ontology
Molecular function	transferase activity; glutathione peroxidase activity; glutathione transferase activity; protein binding
Cellular component	cytoplasm; cytosol; extracellular exosome
Biological process	glutathione derivative biosynthetic process; glutathione metabolic process; cellular oxidant detoxification
Sources:Amigo / QuickGO
Orthologs
Species	Human	Mouse
Entrez	2952	n/a
Ensembl	ENSG00000277656	n/a
UniProt	P30711	n/a
RefSeq (mRNA)	NM_000853; NM_001293807; NM_001293808; NM_001293809; NM_001293810 NM_001293811; NM_001293812; NM_001293813; NM_001293814	n/a
RefSeq (protein)	NP_000844; NP_001280736; NP_001280737; NP_001280738; NP_001280739 NP_001280740; NP_001280741; NP_001280742; NP_001280743	n/a
Location (UCSC)	Chr 22: 24.38 – 24.38 Mb	n/a
PubMed search		n/a
- Wikidata
View/Edit Human

Glutathione S-transferase theta-1 is an enzyme that in humans is encoded by the GSTT1 gene.

Glutathione S-transferase (GST) theta 1 (GSTT1) is a member of a superfamily of proteins that catalyze the conjugation of reduced glutathione to a variety of electrophilic and hydrophobic compounds. Human GSTs can be divided into five main classes: alpha, mu, pi, theta, and zeta. The theta class includes GSTT1 and GSTT2. The GSTT1 and GSTT2 share 55% amino acid sequence identity and both of them were claimed to have an important role in human carcinogenesis. The GSTT1 gene is located approximately 50kb away from the GSTT2 gene. The GSTT1 and GSTT2 genes have a similar structure, being composed of five exons with identical exon/intron boundaries.
