= GSTM4 =

Protein-coding gene in humans

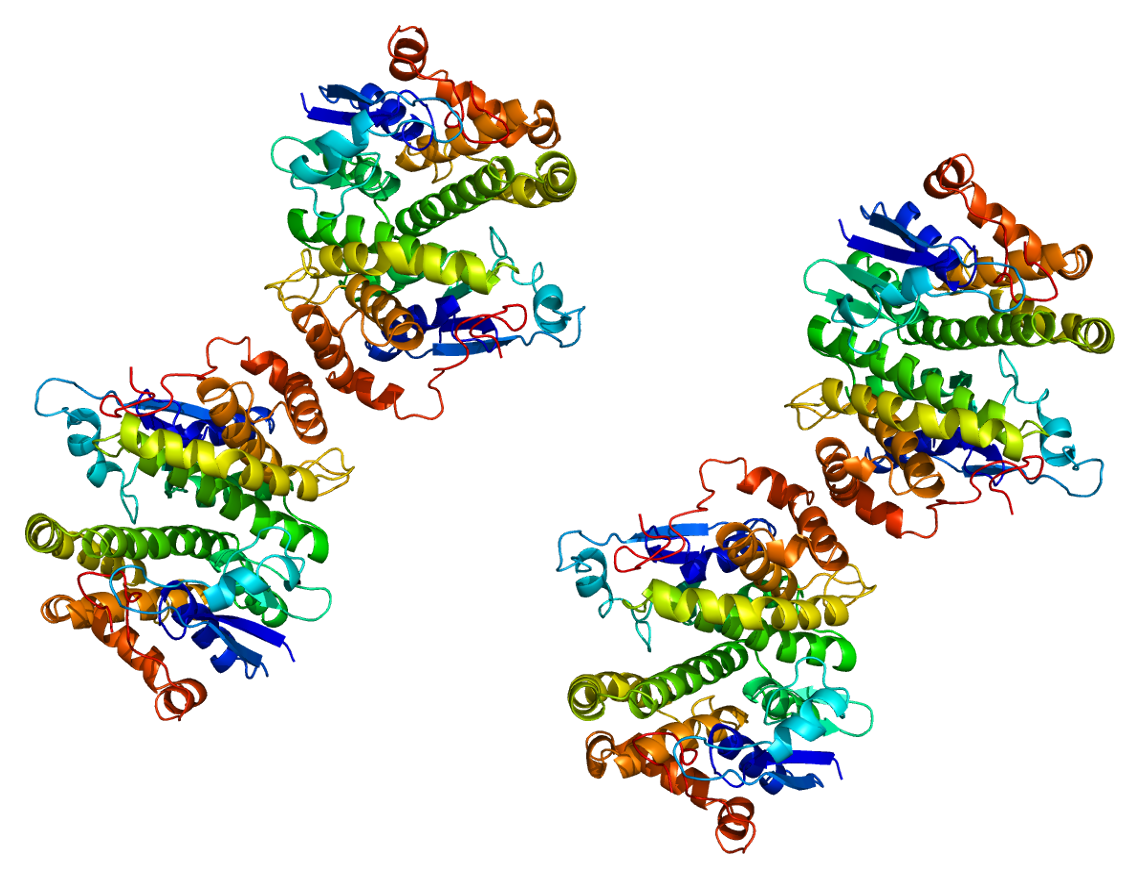

Identifiers
- Aliases: GSTM4, GSTM4-4, GTM4, glutathione S-transferase mu 4
- External IDs: OMIM: 138333; MGI: 95862; GeneCards: GSTM4
Available structures
PDB	Ortholog search: PDBe RCSB
PDB	List of PDB id codes 4GTU
Enzyme activity
EC #	BRENDA	ExPASy	KEGG	MetaCyc
2.5.1.18	↗	↗	↗	↗
4.4.1.20	↗	↗	↗	↗

Gene location (Human)
Chr.	Chromosome 1 (human)
Band	1p13.3	Start	109,656,099 bp
Band	1p13.3	End	109,674,836 bp

Gene location (Mouse)
Chr.	Chromosome 3 (mouse)
Band	3|3 F2.3	Start	107,947,724 bp
Band	3|3 F2.3	End	107,952,210 bp
RNA expression pattern
Bgee	Human / Mouse (ortholog); Top expressed in: muscle of thigh; mucosa of transverse colon; left ovary; apex of heart; right ovary; muscle layer of sigmoid colon; gastrocnemius muscle; rectum; right lobe of liver; right lobe of thyroid gland / Top expressed in: transitional epithelium of urinary bladder; yolk sac; left lobe of liver; duodenum; proximal tubule; right kidney; facial motor nucleus; muscle of thigh; epithelium of small intestine; brown adipose tissue; More reference expression data
BioGPS	n/a
Gene ontology
Molecular function	transferase activity; enzyme binding; glutathione transferase activity; protein binding; protein homodimerization activity; glutathione binding
Cellular component	cytoplasm; cytosol; intercellular bridge
Biological process	metabolism; glutathione metabolic process; glutathione derivative biosynthetic process; nitrobenzene metabolic process; xenobiotic catabolic process; long-chain fatty acid biosynthetic process
Sources:Amigo / QuickGO
Orthologs
Databases	NCBI: entry; OMA: entry
Species	Human	Mouse
Entrez	2948	14865
Ensembl	ENSG00000168765	ENSMUSG00000027890
UniProt	Q03013	Q8R5I6
RefSeq (mRNA)	NM_000850; NM_147148; NM_147149	NM_001160411; NM_026764
RefSeq (protein)	NP_000841; NP_671489	NP_001153883; NP_081040
Location (UCSC)	Chr 1: 109.66 – 109.67 Mb	Chr 3: 107.95 – 107.95 Mb
PubMed search
- Wikidata
View/Edit Human	View/Edit Mouse

Glutathione S-transferase Mu 4 is an enzyme that in humans is encoded by the GSTM4 gene.

Cytosolic and membrane-bound forms of glutathione S-transferase are encoded by two distinct supergene families. At present, eight distinct classes of the soluble cytoplasmic mammalian glutathione S-transferases have been identified: alpha, kappa, mu, omega, pi, sigma, theta and zeta. This gene encodes a glutathione S-transferase that belongs to the mu class. The mu class of enzymes functions in the detoxification of electrophilic compounds, including carcinogens, therapeutic drugs, environmental toxins and products of oxidative stress, by conjugation with glutathione. The genes encoding the mu class of enzymes are organized in a gene cluster on chromosome 1p13.3 and are known to be highly polymorphic. These genetic variations can change an individual's susceptibility to carcinogens and toxins as well as affect the toxicity and efficacy of certain drugs. Diversification of these genes has occurred in regions encoding substrate-binding domains, as well as in tissue expression patterns, to accommodate an increasing number of foreign compounds. Multiple transcript variants, each encoding a distinct protein isoform, have been identified.

In the August 2009 issue of Oncogene journal, researchers at Huntsman Cancer Institute (HCI) at the University of Utah demonstrated that expression levels of GSTM4 could predict response to chemotherapy in patients with Ewing sarcoma. The study found that patients who did not respond to chemotherapy had high levels of GSTM4.
