= Conjunction =

Conjunction may refer to:

- Conjunction (grammar), a part of speech
- Logical conjunction, a mathematical operator
  - Conjunction introduction, a rule of inference of propositional logic
- Conjunction (astronomy), in which two astronomical bodies appear close together in the sky
- Conjunction (astrology), astrological aspect in horoscopic astrology
- Conjunctions (journal), an American literary journal
