= MGST2 =

Protein-coding gene in the species Homo sapiens

Identifiers
- Aliases: MGST2, GST2, MGST-II, microsomal glutathione S-transferase 2
- External IDs: OMIM: 601733; MGI: 2448481; HomoloGene: 1811; GeneCards: MGST2; OMA:MGST2 - orthologs

Gene location (Human)
Chr.	Chromosome 4 (human)
Band	4q31.1	Start	139,665,768 bp
Band	4q31.1	End	139,740,745 bp

Gene location (Mouse)
Chr.	Chromosome 3 (mouse)
Band	3|3 C	Start	51,567,781 bp
Band	3|3 C	End	51,590,098 bp
RNA expression pattern
Bgee	Human / Mouse (ortholog); Top expressed in: mucosa of transverse colon; secondary oocyte; mucosa of esophagus; rectum; right lobe of liver; gallbladder; olfactory zone of nasal mucosa; right adrenal cortex; left adrenal gland; apex of heart / Top expressed in: gastric mucosa; epithelium of stomach; mucous cell of stomach; pyloric antrum; granulocyte; duodenum; Paneth cell; jejunum; ileum; left colon; More reference expression data
BioGPS	n/a
Gene ontology
Molecular function	enzyme activator activity; leukotriene-C4 synthase activity; transferase activity; glutathione transferase activity; protein binding; glutathione peroxidase activity
Cellular component	integral component of membrane; intracellular membrane-bounded organelle; organelle membrane; plasma membrane; cytoplasm; endoplasmic reticulum membrane; endoplasmic reticulum; nuclear envelope; membrane
Biological process	glutathione derivative biosynthetic process; leukotriene metabolic process; leukotriene biosynthetic process; glutathione biosynthetic process; response to lipopolysaccharide; positive regulation of catalytic activity; response to organonitrogen compound; xenobiotic metabolic process; cellular oxidant detoxification; lipid metabolism; membrane lipid catabolic process; positive regulation of inflammatory response
Sources:Amigo / QuickGO
Orthologs
Species	Human	Mouse
Entrez	4258	211666
Ensembl	ENSG00000085871	ENSMUSG00000074604
UniProt	Q99735	A2RST1
RefSeq (mRNA)	NM_001204366; NM_001204367; NM_001204368; NM_002413	NM_174995; NM_001310482
RefSeq (protein)	NP_001191295; NP_001191296; NP_001191297; NP_002404	NP_001297411; NP_778160
Location (UCSC)	Chr 4: 139.67 – 139.74 Mb	Chr 3: 51.57 – 51.59 Mb
PubMed search
- Wikidata
View/Edit Human	View/Edit Mouse

Microsomal glutathione S-transferase 2 is an enzyme that in humans is encoded by the MGST2 gene.

The MAPEG (Membrane-Associated Proteins in Eicosanoid and Glutathione metabolism) family consists of six human proteins, several of which are involved in the production of leukotrienes and prostaglandin E, important mediators of inflammation. This gene encodes a protein that catalyzes the conjugation of leukotriene A4 and reduced glutathione to produce leukotriene C4.
