= Conjugation =

Conjugation or conjugate may refer to:

== Linguistics ==
- Grammatical conjugation, the modification of a verb from its basic form
- Emotive conjugation or Russell's conjugation, the use of loaded language

== Mathematics ==
- Complex conjugation, the change of sign of the imaginary part of a complex number
- Conjugate (square roots), the change of sign of a square root in an expression
- Conjugate element (field theory), a generalization of the preceding conjugations to roots of a polynomial of any degree
- Conjugate transpose, the elementwise complex conjugate of a matrix's transpose
- In group theory, various notions are called conjugation:
  - Matrix similarity, also called matrix conjugation
  - Conjugation (group theory), the analogous operation in arbitrary groups
  - Conjugacy class, a collection of group elements related by conjugation
  - Inner automorphism, the function that conjugation by a fixed element defines
  - Conjugate closure, the image of a subgroup under the overgroup's inner automorphisms
  - Topological conjugation, which identifies equivalent dynamical systems
- Conjugate words in combinatorics
- Harmonic conjugate in complex analysis
- Convex conjugate, the ("dual") lower-semicontinuous convex function resulting from the Legendre–Fenchel transformation of a "primal" function
- Conjugate (graph theory), an alternative term for a line graph, i.e. a graph representing the edge adjacencies of another graph
- Isogonal conjugate, in geometry
- Conjugate gradient method, an algorithm for the numerical solution of particular systems of linear equations
- Conjugate points, in differential geometry

== Probability and statistics ==
- Conjugate prior, in Bayesian statistics, a family of probability distributions that contains a prior and the posterior distributions for a particular likelihood function (particularly for one-parameter exponential families)
- Conjugate pairing of probability distributions, in the Fourier-analytic theory of characteristic functions and statistical mechanics

== Science ==
- Sexual conjugation, a type of isogamy in unicellular eukaryotes
- Bacterial conjugation, a mechanism of exchange of genetic material between bacteria
- Conjugate (anatomy), a type of pelvic measurement
- Conjugate vaccine, in immunology
- Conjugation (biochemistry), covalently linking a biomolecule with another molecule
- Conjugate (acid-base theory), a system describing a conjugate acid-base pair
- Conjugated system, a system of atoms covalently bonded with alternating single and multiple bonds
- Conjugate variables (thermodynamics), pairs of variables that always change simultaneously
- Conjugate quantities, observables that are linked by the Heisenberg uncertainty principle
- Conjugate focal plane, in optics
- Charge conjugation

== See also ==
- Conjugal (disambiguation)
- Conjoint
