= GSTA2 =

Protein-coding gene in the species Homo sapiens

Available structures
PDB	Ortholog search: PDBe RCSB
PDB	List of PDB id codes 1AGS, 2VCT, 2WJU, 4ACS

Identifiers
- Aliases: GSTA2, GST2, GSTA2-2, GTA2, GTH2, glutathione S-transferase alpha 2
- External IDs: OMIM: 138360; MGI: 95863; HomoloGene: 47952; GeneCards: GSTA2; OMA:GSTA2 - orthologs

Gene location (Human)
Chr.	Chromosome 6 (human)
Band	6p12.2	Start	52,750,087 bp
Band	6p12.2	End	52,763,475 bp

Gene location (Mouse)
Chr.	Chromosome 9 (mouse)
Band	9 E1|9 43.65 cM	Start	78,238,300 bp
Band	9 E1|9 43.65 cM	End	78,263,070 bp
RNA expression pattern
Bgee	Human / Mouse (ortholog); Top expressed in: body of pancreas; duodenum; olfactory zone of nasal mucosa; gallbladder; islet of Langerhans; liver; human kidney; right lobe of liver; right testis; left testis / Top expressed in: epithelium of stomach; right kidney; conjunctival fornix; human kidney; transitional epithelium of urinary bladder; left lobe of liver; mucous cell of stomach; esophagus; skin of external ear; retinal pigment epithelium; More reference expression data
BioGPS	n/a
Gene ontology
Molecular function	transferase activity; glutathione transferase activity; protein binding
Cellular component	cytoplasm; cytosol; extracellular exosome
Biological process	metabolism; epithelial cell differentiation; glutathione derivative biosynthetic process; glutathione metabolic process; interleukin-12-mediated signaling pathway; xenobiotic metabolic process
Sources:Amigo / QuickGO
Orthologs
Species	Human	Mouse
Entrez	2939	14858
Ensembl	ENSG00000244067	ENSMUSG00000057933
UniProt	P09210	P10648
RefSeq (mRNA)	NM_000846	NM_008182
RefSeq (protein)	NP_000837	NP_032208
Location (UCSC)	Chr 6: 52.75 – 52.76 Mb	Chr 9: 78.24 – 78.26 Mb
PubMed search
- Wikidata
View/Edit Human	View/Edit Mouse

Glutathione S-transferase A2 is an enzyme that in humans is encoded by the GSTA2 gene.

Cytosolic and membrane-bound forms of glutathione S-transferase are encoded by two distinct supergene families. These enzymes function in the detoxification of electrophilic compounds, including carcinogens, therapeutic drugs, environmental toxins and products of oxidative stress, by conjugation with glutathione. The genes encoding these enzymes are known to be highly polymorphic. These genetic variations can change an individual's susceptibility to carcinogens and toxins as well as affect the toxicity and efficacy of some drugs. At present, eight distinct classes of the soluble cytoplasmic mammalian glutathione S-transferases have been identified: alpha, kappa, mu, omega, pi, sigma, theta and zeta. This gene encodes a glutathione S-transferase belonging to the alpha class. The alpha class genes, located in a cluster mapped to chromosome 6, are the most abundantly expressed glutathione S-transferases in liver. In addition to metabolizing bilirubin and certain anti-cancer drugs in the liver, the alpha class of these enzymes exhibit glutathione peroxidase activity thereby protecting the cells from reactive oxygen species and the products of peroxidation.
