= MGST3 =

Protein-coding gene in humans

Identifiers
- Aliases: MGST3, GST-III, microsomal glutathione S-transferase 3
- External IDs: OMIM: 604564; MGI: 1913697; GeneCards: MGST3
Enzyme activity
EC #	BRENDA	ExPASy	KEGG	MetaCyc
4.4.1.20	↗	↗	↗	↗

Gene location (Human)
Chr.	Chromosome 1 (human)
Band	1q24.1	Start	165,631,213 bp
Band	1q24.1	End	165,661,796 bp

Gene location (Mouse)
Chr.	Chromosome 1 (mouse)
Band	1|1 H2.3	Start	167,199,535 bp
Band	1|1 H2.3	End	167,221,410 bp
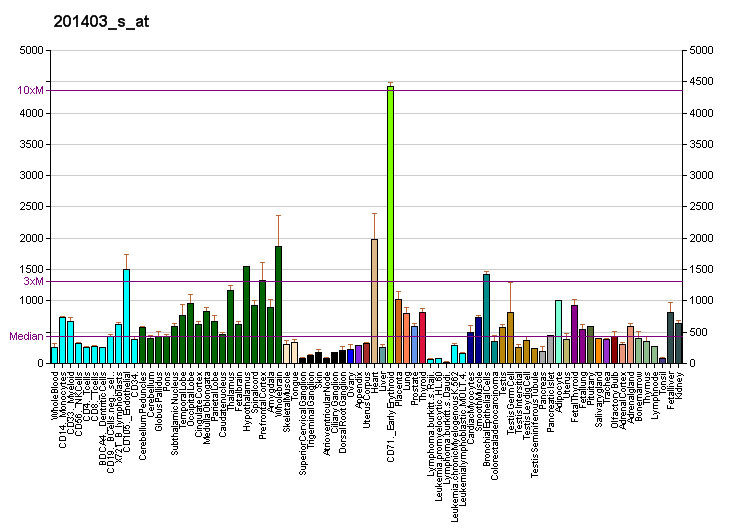
RNA expression pattern
Bgee	Human / Mouse (ortholog); Top expressed in: corpus epididymis; jejunal mucosa; Skeletal muscle tissue of rectus abdominis; pons; right ventricle; thoracic diaphragm; apex of heart; duodenum; Skeletal muscle tissue of biceps brachii; mucosa of sigmoid colon / Top expressed in: fetal liver hematopoietic progenitor cell; mucous cell of stomach; epithelium of stomach; pyloric antrum; olfactory epithelium; digastric muscle; temporal muscle; right ventricle; interventricular septum; duodenum; More reference expression data
BioGPS	More reference expression data
Gene ontology
Molecular function	transferase activity; protein binding; glutathione transferase activity; leukotriene-C4 synthase activity; glutathione peroxidase activity; oxidoreductase activity; lyase activity
Cellular component	integral component of membrane; organelle membrane; extracellular exosome; endoplasmic reticulum membrane; nuclear envelope; endoplasmic reticulum; membrane; intracellular membrane-bounded organelle
Biological process	xenobiotic metabolic process; glutathione derivative biosynthetic process; response to organonitrogen compound; cellular oxidant detoxification; lipid metabolism; leukotriene biosynthetic process
Sources:Amigo / QuickGO
Orthologs
Databases	NCBI: entry; OMA: entry
Species	Human	Mouse
Entrez	4259	66447
Ensembl	ENSG00000143198	ENSMUSG00000026688
UniProt	O14880	Q9CPU4
RefSeq (mRNA)	NM_004528	NM_025569; NM_029392
RefSeq (protein)	NP_004519	NP_079845
Location (UCSC)	Chr 1: 165.63 – 165.66 Mb	Chr 1: 167.2 – 167.22 Mb
PubMed search
- Wikidata
View/Edit Human	View/Edit Mouse

Microsomal glutathione S-transferase 3 is an enzyme that in humans is encoded by the MGST3 gene.

The MAPEG (Membrane-Associated Proteins in Eicosanoid and Glutathione metabolism) family consists of six human proteins, several of which are involved the production of leukotrienes and prostaglandin E, important mediators of inflammation. This gene encodes an enzyme that catalyzes the conjugation of leukotriene A4 and reduced glutathione to produce leukotriene C4. This enzyme also demonstrates glutathione-dependent peroxidase activity towards lipid hydroperoxides.
