= GSTT2 =

Protein-coding gene in the species Homo sapiens

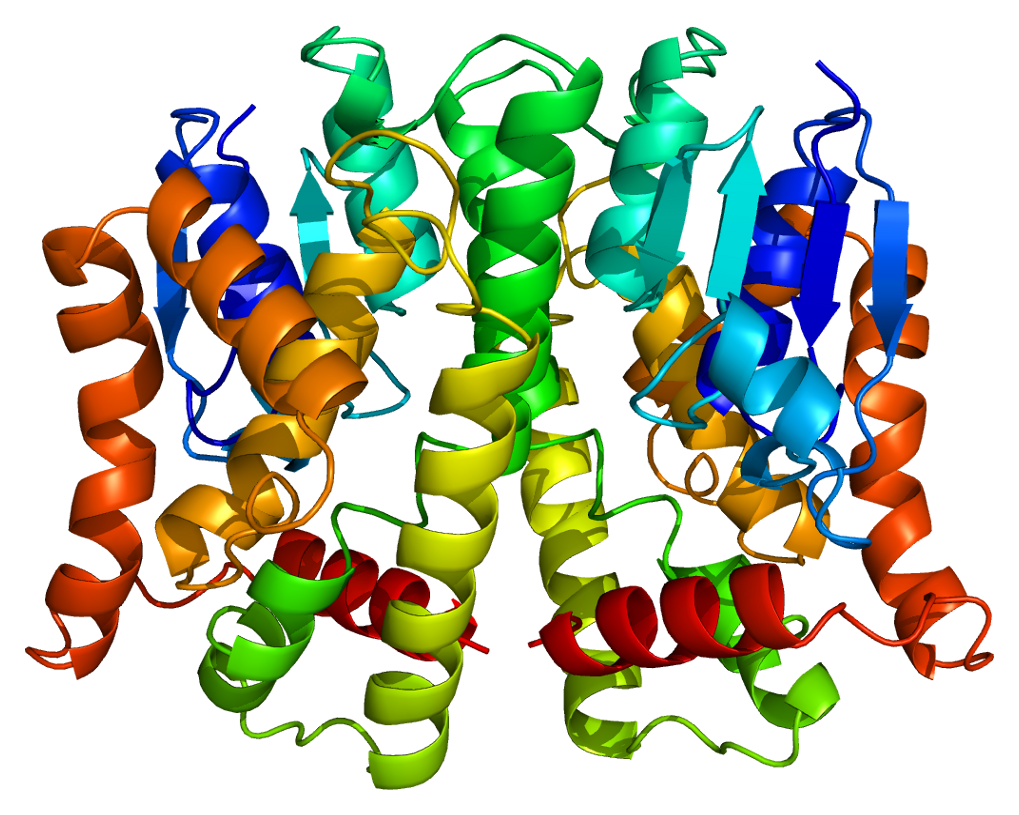
Available structures
PDB	Ortholog search: PDBe RCSB
PDB	List of PDB id codes 4MPF

Identifiers
- Aliases: GSTT2, GSTT2B, glutathione S-transferase theta 2 (gene/pseudogene)
- External IDs: OMIM: 600437; MGI: 106188; HomoloGene: 37358; GeneCards: GSTT2; OMA:GSTT2 - orthologs

Gene location (Human)
Chr.	Chromosome 22 (human)
Band	22q11.23	Start	23,980,058 bp
Band	22q11.23	End	23,983,915 bp

Gene location (Mouse)
Chr.	Chromosome 10 (mouse)
Band	10 C1|10 38.58 cM	Start	75,666,948 bp
Band	10 C1|10 38.58 cM	End	75,673,258 bp
RNA expression pattern
Bgee	Human / Mouse (ortholog); Top expressed in: testicle; stromal cell of endometrium; superior frontal gyrus; prefrontal cortex; fundus; right adrenal cortex; apex of heart; primary visual cortex; left adrenal gland; ascending aorta / Top expressed in: right kidney; human kidney; proximal tubule; duodenum; left lobe of liver; spermatocyte; yolk sac; cervix; embryo; transitional epithelium of urinary bladder; More reference expression data
BioGPS	n/a
Gene ontology
Molecular function	transferase activity; glutathione transferase activity
Cellular component	extracellular exosome; cytoplasm
Biological process	glutathione metabolic process
Sources:Amigo / QuickGO
Orthologs
Species	Human	Mouse
Entrez	2953	14872
Ensembl	ENSG00000099984; ENSG00000277897	ENSMUSG00000033318
UniProt	P0CG29	Q61133
RefSeq (mRNA)	NM_000854; NM_001302670	NM_010361
RefSeq (protein)	NP_000845; NP_001289599	NP_034491
Location (UCSC)	Chr 22: 23.98 – 23.98 Mb	Chr 10: 75.67 – 75.67 Mb
PubMed search
- Wikidata
View/Edit Human	View/Edit Mouse

Glutathione S-transferase theta-2 is an enzyme that in humans is encoded by the GSTT2 gene.

Glutathione S-transferase (GSTs) theta 2 (GSTT2) is a member of a superfamily of proteins that catalyze the conjugation of reduced glutathione to a variety of electrophilic and hydrophobic compounds. Human GSTs can be divided into five main classes: Alpha, Mu, Pi, Theta, and Zeta. The theta class members GSTT1 and GSTT2 share 55% amino acid sequence identity and both are thought to have an important role in human carcinogenesis. The theta genes have a similar structure, being composed of five exons with identical exon/intron boundaries.
