= GSTA3 =

Protein-coding gene in the species Homo sapiens

Available structures
PDB	Ortholog search: PDBe RCSB
PDB	List of PDB id codes 1TDI, 2VCV

Identifiers
- Aliases: GSTA3, GSTA3-3, GTA3, glutathione S-transferase alpha 3
- External IDs: OMIM: 605449; MGI: 95856; HomoloGene: 37355; GeneCards: GSTA3; OMA:GSTA3 - orthologs

Gene location (Human)
Chr.	Chromosome 6 (human)
Band	6p12.2	Start	52,896,639 bp
Band	6p12.2	End	52,909,698 bp

Gene location (Mouse)
Chr.	Chromosome 1 (mouse)
Band	1 A4|1 6.5 cM	Start	21,310,813 bp
Band	1 A4|1 6.5 cM	End	21,335,885 bp
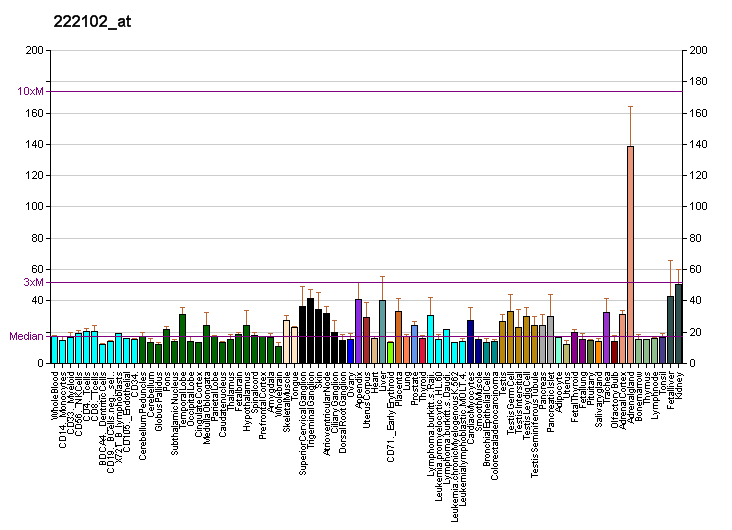
RNA expression pattern
Bgee	Human / Mouse (ortholog); Top expressed in: right uterine tube; right adrenal gland; right adrenal cortex; bronchial epithelial cell; left adrenal cortex; placenta; kidney tubule; testicle; epithelium of nasopharynx; skin of abdomen / Top expressed in: left lobe of liver; right lung lobe; stroma of bone marrow; lacrimal gland; white adipose tissue; right kidney; parotid gland; human kidney; olfactory epithelium; gastric mucosa; More reference expression data
BioGPS	More reference expression data
Gene ontology
Molecular function	glutathione transferase activity; transferase activity
Cellular component	extracellular exosome; cytoplasm; cytosol
Biological process	metabolism; glutathione derivative biosynthetic process; glutathione metabolic process; xenobiotic metabolic process
Sources:Amigo / QuickGO
Orthologs
Species	Human	Mouse
Entrez	2940	14859
Ensembl	ENSG00000174156	ENSMUSG00000025934
UniProt	Q16772	P30115
RefSeq (mRNA)	NM_000847; NM_001363542	NM_001077353; NM_001288617; NM_010356
RefSeq (protein)	NP_000838; NP_001350471	NP_001070821; NP_001275546; NP_034486
Location (UCSC)	Chr 6: 52.9 – 52.91 Mb	Chr 1: 21.31 – 21.34 Mb
PubMed search
- Wikidata
View/Edit Human	View/Edit Mouse

Glutathione S-transferase A3 is an enzyme that in humans is encoded by the GSTA3 gene.

Cytosolic and membrane-bound forms of glutathione S-transferase are encoded by two distinct supergene families. These enzymes are involved in cellular defense against toxic, carcinogenic, and pharmacologically active electrophilic compounds. At present, eight distinct classes of the soluble cytoplasmic mammalian glutathione S-transferases have been identified: alpha, kappa, mu, omega, pi, sigma, theta and zeta. This gene encodes a glutathione S-transferase belonging to the alpha class genes that are located in a cluster mapped to chromosome 6. Genes of the alpha class are highly related and encode enzymes with glutathione peroxidase activity. However, during evolution, this alpha class gene diverged accumulating mutations in the active site that resulted in differences in substrate specificity and catalytic activity. The enzyme encoded by this gene catalyzes the double bond isomerization of precursors for progesterone and testosterone during the biosynthesis of steroid hormones. An additional transcript variant has been identified, but its full length sequence has not been determined.
