= Glutathione S-transferase A1 =

Protein-coding gene in the species Homo sapiens

GSTA1
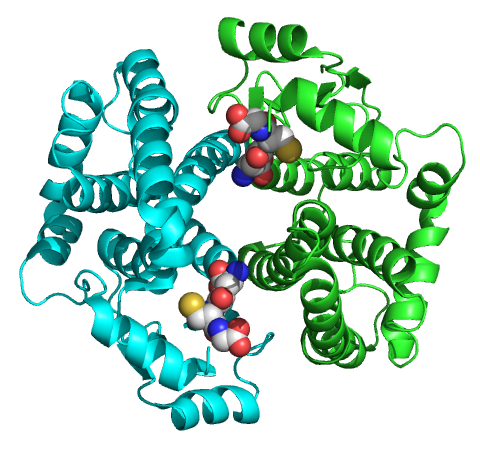

Identifiers
- Aliases: GSTA1, GST2, GSTA1-1, GTH1, GST-epsilon, glutathione S-transferase alpha 1
- External IDs: OMIM: 138359; MGI: 95863; GeneCards: GSTA1
Available structures
PDB	Ortholog search: PDBe RCSB
PDB	List of PDB id codes 1GSD, 1GSE, 1GSF, 1GUH, 1K3L, 1K3O, 1K3Y, 1PKW, 1PKZ, 1PL1, 1PL2, 1USB, 1XWG, 1YDK, 2R3X, 2R6K, 3I69, 3I6A, 3IK9, 3KTL, 3L0H, 3Q74, 3U6V, 3ZFB, 3ZFL, 4HJ2
Enzyme activity
EC #	BRENDA	ExPASy	KEGG	MetaCyc
2.5.1.18	↗	↗	↗	↗

Gene location (Human)
Chr.	Chromosome 6 (human)
Band	6p12.2	Start	52,791,371 bp
Band	6p12.2	End	52,803,860 bp

Gene location (Mouse)
Chr.	Chromosome 9 (mouse)
Band	9 E1|9 43.65 cM	Start	78,238,300 bp
Band	9 E1|9 43.65 cM	End	78,263,070 bp
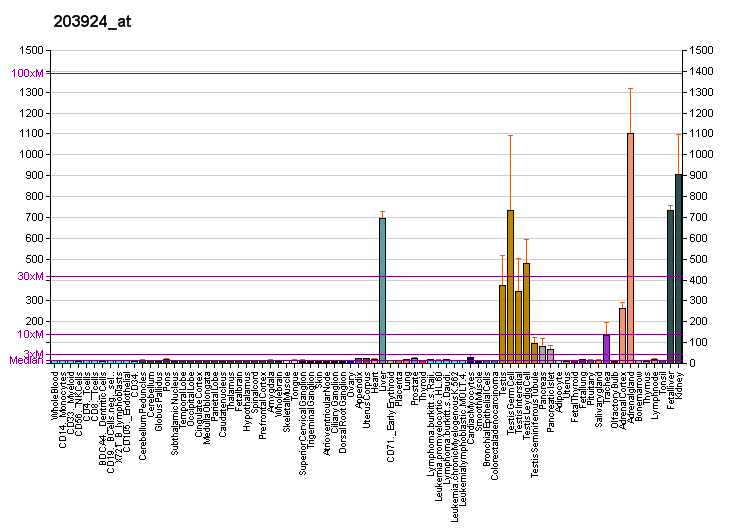
RNA expression pattern
Bgee	Human / Mouse (ortholog); Top expressed in: bronchial epithelial cell; jejunal mucosa; right adrenal gland; right adrenal cortex; left adrenal cortex; epithelium of nasopharynx; olfactory zone of nasal mucosa; nasal epithelium; duodenum; mucosa of ileum / Top expressed in: epithelium of stomach; right kidney; conjunctival fornix; human kidney; transitional epithelium of urinary bladder; left lobe of liver; mucous cell of stomach; esophagus; skin of external ear; retinal pigment epithelium; More reference expression data
BioGPS	More reference expression data
Gene ontology
Molecular function	transferase activity; glutathione peroxidase activity; glutathione transferase activity; steroid delta-isomerase activity; peroxidase activity; oxidoreductase activity; isomerase activity
Cellular component	cytoplasm; extracellular exosome; cytosol
Biological process	metabolism; epithelial cell differentiation; glutathione derivative biosynthetic process; glutathione metabolic process; cellular oxidant detoxification; linoleic acid metabolic process; prostaglandin metabolic process; xenobiotic metabolic process
Sources:Amigo / QuickGO
Orthologs
Databases	NCBI: entry; OMA: entry
Species	Human	Mouse
Entrez	2938	14858
Ensembl	ENSG00000243955	ENSMUSG00000057933
UniProt	P08263	P10648
RefSeq (mRNA)	NM_145740; NM_001319059	NM_008182
RefSeq (protein)	NP_001305988; NP_665683	NP_032208
Location (UCSC)	Chr 6: 52.79 – 52.8 Mb	Chr 9: 78.24 – 78.26 Mb
PubMed search
- Wikidata
View/Edit Human	View/Edit Mouse

Glutathione S-transferase A1 is an enzyme that in humans is encoded by the GSTA1 gene.

Cytosolic and membrane-bound forms of glutathione S-transferase are encoded by two distinct supergene families. These enzymes function in the detoxification of electrophilic compounds, including carcinogens, therapeutic drugs, environmental toxins and products of oxidative stress, by conjugation with glutathione. The genes encoding these enzymes are known to be highly polymorphic. These genetic variations can change an individual's susceptibility to carcinogens and toxins as well as affect the toxicity and efficacy of some drugs. At present, eight distinct classes of the soluble cytoplasmic mammalian glutathione S-transferases have been identified: alpha, kappa, mu, omega, pi, sigma, theta and zeta. This gene encodes a glutathione S-transferase belonging to the alpha class. The alpha class genes, located in a cluster mapped to chromosome 6, are the most abundantly expressed glutathione S-transferases in liver (hepatocytes) and kidney (proximal tubules). In addition to metabolizing bilirubin and certain anti-cancer drugs in the liver, the alpha class of these enzymes exhibit glutathione peroxidase activity, thereby protecting the cells from reactive oxygen species and the products of peroxidation.

== Release of GST-A1 as an indication of cellular necrosis ==
Increases in serum and urinary GST-A1 have been found in association with hepatocyte and renal proximal tubular necrosis respectively, and have potential for monitoring injury to these tissues.
