= 15-hydroxyprostaglandin dehydrogenase =

15-hydroxyprostaglandin dehydrogenase may refer to:

- 15-hydroxyprostaglandin-D dehydrogenase (NADP+)
- 15-hydroxyprostaglandin-I dehydrogenase (NADP+)
- 15-hydroxyprostaglandin dehydrogenase (NAD+)
- 15-hydroxyprostaglandin dehydrogenase (NADP+)
