= 5-Hydroxyeicosanoid dehydrogenase =

Class of enzymes

5-Hydroxyeicosanoid dehydrogenase (5-HEDH) or more formally, nicotinamide adenine dinucleotide phosphate (NADP^{+})-dependent dehydrogenase, is an enzyme that metabolizes between two eicosanoid metabolites of arachidonate 5-lipoxygenase (5-LOX): 5-hydroxyeicosatetraenoic acid (5-(S)-HETE), and its 5-keto analog 5-oxo-eicosatetraenoic acid (5-oxo-ETE). It also acts in the reverse direction, metabolizing 5-oxo-ETE to 5(S)-HETE. Since 5-oxo-ETE is 30–100-fold more potent than 5(S)-HETE in stimulating various cell types, 5-HEDH is regarded as a regulator and promoter of the influence that 5-LOX and its metabolites have on cell function. Although 5-HEDH has been evaluated in a wide range of intact cells and in crude microsome preparations, it has not yet been evaluated for its structure or gene, and most studies on it have been limited to human tissues.

== Substrates ==
The substrate specificity of 5-HEDH has been evaluated in a variety of intact cells and in crude microsome preparations isolated from cultured human blood monocytes differentiated into macrophages. These studies indicate that the enzyme efficiently oxidizes long chain unsaturated fatty acids possessing a hydroxy residue at carbon 5 and a trans double bond at carbon 6 to their corresponding 5-oxo products. It is therefore most efficient in metabolizing 5(S)-HETE to 5-oxo-ETE and, with somewhat lesser efficiency, in metabolizing other 5(S)-hydroxyl-6-trans unsaturated fatty acids such as 5(S)-hydroxy-eicosapentaenoic acid, 5(S)-hydroxy-eicosatrienoic acid, 5(S)-hydroxy-eicosadeinoic acid, 5(S)-hydroxy-eicosamonoenoic acid, 5(S)-hydroxy-octadecadienoic acid, 5(S),15(S)-dihydroxyeicosatetraenoic acid, and the 6-trans isomer of leukotriene B4 (which is a 5(S),12(S)-dihydroxyeicosatetraeonic acid) to their corresponding oxo analogs. 5-HEDH has relatively little ability to oxidize 5(S)-hydroxyl-tetradecadienoic acid, the R stereoisomer of 5(S)-HETE (5(R)-HETE), or a racemic mixture of 8-HETE, and does not oxidize 12(S)-HETE, 15(S)-HETE, leukotriene B4, a racemate mixture of 9-HETE, a racemate mixture of 11-HETE, or a 5(S)-hydroxy-6-trans 12 carbon dienoic fatty acid. 5-HEDH is therefore hydroxy dehydrogenase that acts in a stereospecific manner to oxidize 5(S)-hydoxy residues in 6-trans unsaturated intermediate but not short-chain fatty acids.

== Enzymology ==
5-HEDH is an NADPH dehydrogenase oxidoreductase enzyme. It transfers a hydrogen cation (or hydron) H^{+} from 5(S)-hydroxy (i.e. 5(S)-OH) residues of its fatty acid targets to nicotinamide adenine dinucleotide phosphate^{+} (NADP^{+}) to form 5-oxo (i.e. 5-O=) counterparts of its targets plus reduced NADP^{+}, i.e. NADPH. The reaction (where R indicates a long chain [14 or more carbons] fatty acid) is:

NADP^{+} + 5(S)-hydroxy fatty acid (i.e. 5(S)-OH-R) $\rightleftharpoons$ NADPH + H^{+} + oxo fatty acid (i.e. 5-O=R)

The reaction appears to follow a ping-pong mechanism. It is fully reversible, readily converting 5-oxo targets to their corresponding 5(S)-hydroxy counterparts. The direction of this reaction is dependent on the level of NADP^{+} relative to that of NADPH:

1. cells bearing high NADP^{+}/NADPH ratios convert 5-hydroxy fatty acids which they make or are presented with to 5(S) fatty acids;
2. cells bearing low NADP^{+}/NADPH ratios convert little or none of the 5-hydroxy fatty acids which they make or are presented with to 5-oxo fatty acids and rapidly reduce the 5-oxo fatty acids which they are presented with to the corresponding 5(S)-hydroxy fatty acids.

== Alternate 5-oxo-ETE producing pathways ==
The immediate metabolic precursor to 5(S)-HETE, 5(S)-hydroperoxy-6S,8Z,11Z,14Z-eicosatetraenoic acid 5(S)-HpETE, can be converted to 5-oxo-ETE in a non-enzymatic dehydration reaction or chemical lipid peroxidation reactions. The physiological occurrence and relevancy of these reaction pathways has not been ascertained.

== Cellular distribution ==
Since 5-HEDH has not been defined biochemically or genetically, studies on its distribution have been limited to examining the ability of cells or cell microsomes to make 5-oxo-ETE from 5(S)-HETE. A wide variety of cell types possess this activity including blood neutrophils, monocytes, eosinophils, B lymphocytes, and platelets; airway epithelial cells, airway smooth muscle cells, vascular endothelial cells, and monocytes differentiated in vitro to dendritic cells; and cancer cell lines derived from many of these cells or from prostate, breast, and colon cancer cells.

== Activity and regulation ==
Cells typically maintain low NADP^{+}/NADPH ratios by rapidly reducing NADP^{+} to NADPH using glutathione reductase in a cyclical NADPH replenishing reaction. These cells rapidly reduce ambient 5-oxo-ETE to 5(S)-HETE. However, cells suffering oxidative stress generate excesses in toxic reactive oxygen species such as hydrogen peroxide (H_{2}O_{2}). Cells use glutathione peroxidase to detoxify this H_{2}O_{2} by converting it to H_{2}O in a reaction that consumes glutathione by converting it to glutathione disulfide; the cells then metabolize glutathione disulfide back to glutathione in a glutathione reductase-dependent reaction that converts NADPH to NADP^{+}. While cells suffering oxidative stress can replenish NADPH by reducing NADP^{+} through the pentose phosphate pathway, they often develop very high NADP^{+}/NADPH ratios and therefore preferentially convert 5-(S)-HETE to 5-oxo-ETE. Cells that function as phagocytes have a second pathway that dramatically raises NADP^{+}/NADPH ratios. Neutrophils and macrophages, for example, after phagocytosing bacteria or otherwise strongly stimulated to activate their respiratory burst generate reactive oxygen species including H_{2}O_{2} by activating NADPH. The latter cell types have particularly high levels of 5-HEDH and therefore are particularly important producers of 5-oxo-ETE when so stimulated. The death of neutrophils and tumor cells also strongly promotes the oxidation of 5-HETE to 5-oxo-ETE, probably as a result of associated oxidative stress.

== Function ==
5-HEDH functions as a highly specific oxidizer of 5(S)-HETE to 5-oxo-ETE; no functional importance has yet been ascribed to its ability in similarly oxidizing other 5(S)-hydroxyl fatty acids. 5-Oxo-ETE stimulates a wide range of biological activities far more potently and powerfully than 5(S)-HETE. For example, it is 30–100-fold more potent in stimulating cells that promote inflammation and allergy reactions such as neutrophils, monocytes, macrophages, eosinophils, and basophils and is more potent than 5-HETE in stimulating various types of cancer cells to grow. Furthermore, 5-oxo-ETE appears to be involved in various animal and human reactions: injected into the skin of rabbits, it causes a severe edema with an inflammatory cell infiltrate resembling an urticaria-like lesion; it is present in bronchoalveolar lavage fluid from cats undergoing experimentally induced asthma; it stimulates the local accumulation of eosinophils, neutrophils, and monocytes when injected into the skin of humans; and it has been extracted from scales of psoriatic patients. Most if not all of these allergic and inflammatory conditions as well as rapidly growing cancerous lesions are associated with oxidative stress. Studies therefore suggest that 5-HEDH contributes to the development and progression of these reactions and diseases by being responsible for generating 5-oxo-ETE. It also possible that the cells involved in these pathological states favor the reversed action of 5-HEDH, conversion of 5-oxo-ETE to 5(S)-HETE, as a consequence of reductions in oxidative stress and thereby NADP^{+}/NADPH ratios; such cells might then actually "detoxify" 5-oxo-ETE and contribute to resolving the pathological states.

== Other eicosanoid oxoreductases ==
A 15-hydroxyicosatetraenoate dehydrogenase metabolizes 15-hydroxyicosatetraenoic acid (i.e. 15(S)-hydroxy-5Z,8Z,11Z,13E-eicosatetraenoic acid or 15-HETE) to its 15-keto analog, 15-oxo-ETE, using NAD^{+} and NADH rather than NADP^{+} and NADPH as its co-factors. 15-Oxo-ETE appears to have a somewhat different spectrum of activities than its precursor, 15-HETE (see 15-Hydroxyicosatetraenoic acid § 15-Oxo-ETE). Other eicosanoid oxoreductases that use NAD^{+} and NADH as co-factors include: 12-hydroxyicosatetraenoate dehydrogenase which metabolizes 12-hydroxyeicosatetraenoic acid (12-HETE) and LTB4 to their corresponding 12-oxo analogs and 11-hydroxy-TXB2 dehydrogenase, which metabolizes TXB2 to its 11-oxo analog; and 15-hydroxyprostaglandin dehydrogenase (NAD+) which metabolizes (5Z,13E)-(15S)-11alpha,15-dihydroxy-9-oxoprost-13-enoate to its 15-oxo analog. Other eicosanoid oxireductases that use NADP^{+} and NADPH as cofactors include LTB4 12-hydroxy dehydrogenase which metabolizes LTB4 to its 12-oxo analog, and 15-hydroxyprostaglandin-D dehydrogenase (NADP+), 15-hydroxyprostaglandin-I dehydrogenase (NADP+), and 15-hydroxyprostaglandin dehydrogenase (NADP+) which metabolize PGD2, PGI2, and (13E)-(15S)-11alpha,15-dihydroxy-9-oxoprost-13-enoate, respectively, to their corresponding 15-oxo analogs.
