= Mead acid =

20-Carbon polyunsaturated fatty acid

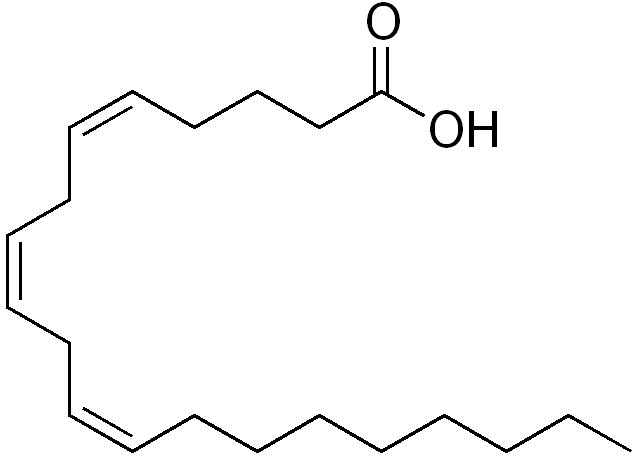

Names
- Preferred IUPAC name (5Z,8Z,11Z)-Icosa-5,8,11-trienoic acid

Identifiers
| CAS Number | 20590-32-3 |
| 3D model (JSmol) | Interactive image |
| ChEBI | CHEBI:72865 |
| ChemSpider | 4471956 |
| PubChem CID | 5312531 |
| UNII | JQS194YH3X |
| CompTox Dashboard (EPA) | DTXSID10920487 |
- InChI: InChI=1S/C20H34O2/c1-2-3-4-5-6-7-8-9-10-11-12-13-14-15-16-17-18-19-20(21)22/h9-10,12-13,15-16H,2-8,11,14,17-19H2,1H3,(H,21,22)/b10-9-,13-12-,16-15- Key: UNSRRHDPHVZAHH-YOILPLPUSA-N; InChI=1/C20H34O2/c1-2-3-4-5-6-7-8-9-10-11-12-13-14-15-16-17-18-19-20(21)22/h9-10,12-13,15-16H,2-8,11,14,17-19H2,1H3,(H,21,22)/b10-9-,13-12-,16-15- Key: UNSRRHDPHVZAHH-YOILPLPUBD
- SMILES: CCCCCCCC\C=C/C\C=C/C\C=C/CCCC(=O)O

Properties
| Chemical formula | C_{20}H_{34}O_{2} |
| Molar mass | 306.48276 |
- Except where otherwise noted, data are given for materials in their standard state (at 25 °C [77 °F], 100 kPa). verify (what is ?) Infobox references

Mead acid is an omega-9 fatty acid, first characterized by James F. Mead. As with some other omega-9 polyunsaturated fatty acids, animals can make Mead acid de novo. Its elevated presence in the blood is an indication of essential fatty acid deficiency. Mead acid is found in large quantities in cartilage.

== Chemistry ==
Mead acid, also referred to as eicosatrienoic acid, is chemically a carboxylic acid with a 20-carbon chain and three methylene-interrupted cis double bonds, as is typical for polyunsaturated fatty acids. The first double bond is located at the ninth carbon from the omega end. In physiological literature, it is given the name 20:3 (n-9). (See Fatty acid § Nomenclature for an explanation of the naming system.) In the presence of lipoxygenase, cytochrome p450, or cyclooxygenase, mead acid can form various hydroxyeicosatetraenoic acid (HETE) and hydroperoxy (HpETE) products.

== Physiology ==
Two fatty acids, linoleic acid and alpha-linolenic acid, are considered essential fatty acids (EFAs) in humans and other mammals. Both are 18 carbon fatty acids unlike mead acid, which has 20 carbons. Linoleic is an ω-6 fatty acid whereas linolenic is ω-3 and mead is ω-9. One study examined patients with intestinal fat malabsorption and suspected EFA deficiency; they were found to have blood-levels of mead acid about 13-fold higher than reference subjects. Under severe conditions of essential fatty acid deprivation, mammals will elongate and desaturate oleic acid to make mead acid, (20:3, n−9). This has been documented to a lesser extent in vegetarians and semi-vegetarians following an unbalanced diet.

Mead acid has been found to decrease osteoblastic activity. This may be important in treating conditions where inhibition of bone formation is desired.

== Role in inflammation ==
Cyclooxygenases are enzymes known to play a large role in inflammatory processes through oxidation of unsaturated fatty acids, most notably, the formation of prostaglandin H2 from arachidonic acid (AA). AA has the same chain length as Mead acid but an additional ω-6 double bond. When physiological levels of arachidonic acid are low, other unsaturated fatty acids including mead and linoleic acid are oxidized by COX. Cyclooxygenase breaks the bisallylic C-H bond of AA to synthesize prostaglandin H2, but breaks a stronger allylic C-H bond when it encounters Mead acid instead.

Mead acid is also converted to leukotrienes C3 and D3.

Mead acid is metabolized by 5-lipoxygenase to 5-hydroxyeicosatrienoic acid (5-HETrE) and then by 5-hydroxyeicosanoid dehydrogenase to 5-oxoeicosatrienoic acid (5-oxo-ETrE). 5-Oxo-ETrE is as potent as its arachidonic acid-derived analog, 5-oxo-eicosatetraenoic acid (5-oxo-ETE), in stimulating human blood eosinophils and neutrophils; it presumably does so by binding to the 5-oxo-ETE receptor (OXER1) and therefore may be, like 5-oxo-ETE, a mediator of human allergic and inflammatory reactions.

== See also ==
- Polyunsaturated fat – lists of ω-3 and ω-6 fatty acids; some others.
- Eicosanoid
- Prostaglandin
