= C20H21N3O =

The molecular formula C_{20}H_{21}N_{3}O (molar mass: 319.40 g/mol, exact mass: 319.1685 u) may refer to:

- Cilansetron
- Imidafenacin
- Lysergic acid pyrrolinide
- ML148
- LEK-8842
