= 5-Oxo-eicosatetraenoic acid =

Names
- Preferred IUPAC name (6E,8Z,11Z,14Z)-5-Oxoicosa-6,8,11,14-tetraenoic acid
- Other names: 5-Oxo-6E,8Z,11Z,14Z-eicosatetraenoate; 5-oxo-ETE; 5-oxoETE; 5-KETE

Identifiers
CAS Number	106154-18-1
3D model (JSmol)	Interactive image
ChEBI	CHEBI:52449
ChEMBL	ChEMBL18028
ChemSpider	4446283
KEGG	C14732
PubChem CID	5283159
- InChI: InChI=1S/C20H30O3/c1-2-3-4-5-6-7-8-9-10-11-12-13-14-16-19(21)17-15-18-20(22)23/h6-7,9-10,12-14,16H,2-5,8,11,15,17-18H2,1H3,(H,22,23)/b7-6-,10-9-,13-12-,16-14+ Key: MEASLHGILYBXFO-XTDASVJISA-N
- SMILES: CCCCC\C=C/C\C=C/C\C=C/C=C/C(=O)CCCC(O)=O

Properties
Chemical formula	C_{20}H_{30}O_{3}
Molar mass	318.457 g·mol^{−1}
- Except where otherwise noted, data are given for materials in their standard state (at 25 °C [77 °F], 100 kPa). Infobox references

5-Oxo-eicosatetraenoic acid (i.e. 5-oxo-6E,8Z,11Z,14Z-eicosatetraenoic acid; also termed 5-oxo-ETE and 5-oxoETE) is a nonclassic eicosanoid metabolite of arachidonic acid and the most potent naturally occurring member of the 5-HETE family of cell signaling agents. Like other cell signaling agents, 5-oxo-ETE is made by a cell and then feeds back to stimulate its parent cell (see Autocrine signaling) and/or exits this cell to stimulate nearby cells (see Paracrine signaling). 5-Oxo-ETE can stimulate various cell types particularly human leukocytes but possesses its highest potency and power in stimulating the human eosinophil type of leukocyte. It is therefore suggested to be formed during and to be an important contributor to the formation and progression of eosinophil-based allergic reactions; it is also suggested that 5-oxo-ETE contributes to the development of inflammation, cancer cell growth, and other pathological and physiological events.

== Biochemistry and production ==
In the most common means for its production, cells make 5-oxo-ETE in a four step pathway that involves their stimulus-induced activation of the following pathway: a) the release of arachidonic acid (i.e. 5Z,8Z,11Z,14Z-eicosatetraenoic acid) from its storage sites in membrane phospholipids due to the activation of phospholipase A2 enzymes; b) oxygenation of this arachidonic acid by activated arachidonate 5-lipoxygenase (ALOX5) to form 5(S)-hydroperoxy-6E,8Z,11Z,14Z-eicosatetraenoic acid (5(S)-HpETE); c) reduction of this 5(S)-HpETE by ubiquitous cellular peroxidases to form 5(S)-hydroxy-6E,8Z,11Z,14Z-eicosatetraenoic acid (5(S)-HETE); and (d) the oxidation of 5(S)-HETE by a microsome-bound nicotinamide adenine dinucleotide phosphate (NADP^{+})-dependent dehydrogenase enzyme viz., 5-hydroxyeicosanoid dehydrogenase (5-HEDH), to form 5-oxo-ETE:

a) Phospholipid-bound arachidonic acid → free arachidonic acid
b) Free arachidonic acid + O_{2} → 5(S)-HpETE
c) 5(S)-HpETE → 5(S)-HETE
d) 5(S)-HETE + NADP^{+} $\rightleftharpoons$ 5-oxo-ETE + NADPH

5-HEDH has little or no ability to metabolize the R stereoisomer of 5(S)-HETE viz., 5(R)-HETE, to 5-oxo-ETE. Furthermore, it acts in a fully reversible manner, readily converting 5-oxo-ETE back to 5(S)-HETE. Since cells typically maintain very high levels of NADPH compared to their NADP^{+} levels, they generally have little or no ability to convert 5(S)-HEE to 5-oxo-ETE, and when confronted with 5-oxo-ETE rapidly metabolize it to 5(S)-HETE. However, cells undergoing aging, senescence, apoptosis, oxidative stress, or other conditions that raise their levels of reactive oxygen species (e.g. superoxide anion, oxygen radicals, and peroxides) either physiologically (e.g. human phagocytes engulfing bacteria) or pathologically (e.g. oxidatively challenged B-lymphocytes) use up NADP^{+}, have low NADPH/NADP^{+} ratios, and therefore readily convert 5(S)-HETE to 5-oxo-ETE. Thus, many pathological conditions that involve oxidative stress such as occurs in rapidly growing cancers may be important promoters of 5-oxo-ETE accumulation in vivo.

5-Oxo-ETE can also be made from either 5(S)-HpETE (and possibly 5(R)-HpEPE) by the action of cytochrome P450 (CYP) enzymes such as CYP1A1, CYP1A2, CYP1B1, and CYP2S1, or from 5(S)-HETE (and probably 5(R)-HETE) by the non-enzymatic attack with heme or various other dehydrating agents. It may also form by the conversion of 5-(S)-HpETE or 5(R)-HpETE to 5-oxo-ETE due to the action of a mouse macrophage 50–60 kilodalton cytosolic protein. The contribution of the latter three pathways to the physiological production of 5-oxo-ETE has not been fully evaluated.

An isomer of 5-oxo-ETE, 5-oxo-(7E,9E,11Z,14Z)-eicosatetraenoic acid, forms non-enzymatically as a byproduct of hydrolyses of the 5-lipoxgenase metabolite, leukotriene A4. This byproduct differs from 5-oxo-ETE not only in the position and geometry of its double bounds but also in its activity: it stimulates human neutrophils apparently by acting on one or more LTB4 receptors rather than OXER1.

== Tissue sources ==
=== Cellular production ===
Human neutrophils, monocytes, eosinophils, B-lymphocytes, dendritic cells, platelets, airway epithelial cells and smooth muscle cells, vascular endothelial cells, and skin keratinocytes have been found and/or suggested to make 5-oxo-ETE from endogenous or exogenous 5-HETE, particularly under conditions of oxidative stress; cell lines derived from human cancers such as those from breast, prostate, lung, colon, and various types of leukemia have likewise been shown to be producers of 5-oxo-ETE.

=== Transcellular production ===
Cells of one type may release the 5(S)-HETE that they make to nearby cells of a second type which then oxidize the 5(S)-HETE to 5-oxo-ETE. This transcellular production typically involves the limited variety of cell types that express active 5-lipoxygenase, lack HEDH activity because of their high levels of NADPH compared to NADP^{+} levels, and therefore accumulate 5(S)-HETE, not 5-oxo-ETE, upon stimulation. This 5(S)-ETE can leave these cells, enter various cell types that possess 5-HEDH activity along with lower NADPH to NADP^{+} levels, and thereby be converted to 5-oxo-ETE. Transcellular production of 5-oxo-eicosatetraenoates has been demonstrated in vitro with human neutrophils as the 5(S)-HETE producing cells and human PC-3 prostate cancer cells, platelets, and monocyte-derived dendritic cells as the oxidizing cells. It is theorized that this transcellular metabolism occurs in vivo and provides a mechanism for controlling 5-oxo-ETE production by allowing it to occur or be augmented at sites were 5-lipoxygenase-containing cells congregate with cell types possessing 5-HEDH and favorable NADPH/NADP^{+} ratios; such sites, it is theorized, might include those involving allergy, inflammation, oxidative stress, and rapidly growing cancers.

== Metabolism ==
As indicated in the previous section, 5-oxo-ETE is readily converted to 5(S)-HETE by 5-HEDH in cells containing very low NADPH/NADP^{+} ratios. Human neutrophils, an important model cell for investigating 5-oxo-ETE production, take up 5-oxo-ETE and reduce it to 5(S)-HETE; they also form appreciable amounts of 5(S)-20-dihydroxy-ETE and small amounts of 5-oxo,20-hydroxy-ETE probably by the action of the ω-hydroxylase cytochrome P450 enzyme, CYP453A on 5(S)-HETE and 5-oxo-ETE, respectively. The cells also incorporate the 5(S)-HETE product of 5-oxo-ETE but little or no 5-oxo-ETE itself as an ester into various phospholipid and glycerolipid pools; however, isolated neutrophil plasma membranes, which lack appreciable 5-HEDH activity, do esterify 5-oxo-ETE into these lipid pools.

Several other pathways can metabolize 5-oxo-ETE. First, human eosinophils use arachidonate 15-lipoxygenase-1 (or possibly arachidonate 15-lipoxygenase-2 to metabolize 5-oxo-ETE to 5-oxo-15-(S)-hydroperoxy-ETE which is rapidly reduced to 5-oxo-15(S)-hydroxy-ETE; 5-oxo-15(S)-hydroxyl-ETE is about one-third as potent as 5-oxo-ETE in stimulating cells. Second, human platelets use 12-lipoxygenase to metabolize 5-oxo-ETE to 5-oxo-12(S)-hydroperoxy-eicosatetraenoate, which is rapidly converted to 5-oxo-12(S)-hydroxy-eicosatetraenoate (5-oxo-12(S)-hydroxy-ETE); 5-oxo-12(S)-hydroxyl-ETE is a weak antagonist of 5-oxo-ETE. Third, mouse macrophages use a) a cytochrome P450 enzyme to metabolize 5-oxo-ETE to 5-oxo-18-hydroxy-ETE (5-oxo-18-HETE) which is either attacked by a 5-keto-reductase (possibly 5-HEDH) to form 5,18-dihydroxy-eicosatetraenoic acid (5,18-diHETE) or by a Δ6-reductase to form 5-oxo-18-hydroxy-eicosatrienoic acid (5-oxo-18-HETrE) which is then reduced by a 5-keto-reductase (possibly 5-HEDH) to 5,18-dihydroxy-eicosatrienoic acid (5,18-diHETrE); b) a cytochrome P450 enzyme converts 5-oxo-ETE to 5-oxo-19-hydroxy-eicosatetraenoic acid (5-oxo-19-HETE) which is then either reduced by a keto reductase (possibly 5-HEDH) to 5,19-dihydroxy-eicosatetraenoic acid (5,19-diHETE) or by a Δ6 reductase to 5-oxo-19-hydroxy-eicosatrienoic acid (5-oxo-19-HETrE); or c) leukotriene C4 synthase to metabolize 5-oxo-ETE to 5-oxo-7-glutathionyl-8,11,14-eicosatrienoic acid (FOG7). FOG7 simulates cells by a different mechanism than 5-oxo-ETE; the biological activity of the other mouse-derived metabolites has not been reported.

== Mechanism of action ==
=== The OXER1 receptor ===
Studies in human neutrophils first detected a plasma membrane-localized site which reversibly bound 5-oxo-ETE and had the attributes of a Gi alpha subunit-linked G protein-coupled receptor based on the ability of 5-oxo-ETE to activate this class of membrane G proteins by a pertussis toxin-sensitive mechanism. Subsequently, this receptor was cloned by several groups who termed it the oxoeicosanoid receptor 1 (OXER1), OXE, OXE-R, hGPCR48, HGPCR48, or R527 (its gene is termed OXE1 or OXER1), and found it coupled with and activated the G protein complex composed of the Gi alpha subunit (Gαi) and G beta-gamma complex (Gβγ). When bound by 5-oxo-ETE, the OXER1 triggers this G protein complex to dissociate into its Gαi and Gβγ components; dissociated Gβγ is responsible for activating many of the signal pathways that lead to the cellular functional responses elicited by 5-oxo-ETE. These signaling pathways include those evoking rises in calcium ion levels as well as others that activate MAPK/ERK, p38 mitogen-activated protein kinases, cytosolic phospholipase A2, PI3K/Akt, protein kinase C beta (PKCβ), and/or (PKCε). Most actions of the 5-oxo-ETE appear mediated by OXER1; however, some of its cell-stimulating actions appear to be OXER1-independent, as indicated in the following section. Other compounds can also stimulate cells through OXER1. Many of these compounds differ slightly from 5-oxo-ETE in structure by the replacement of one atom by an atom of a different element, by the loss of one or more atoms, and/or by the presence of a functional group not found in 5-oxo-ETE. These compounds are termed 5-oxo-ETE analogs or members of the 5-oxo-ETE family of agonists. 5-HETE and 5-hydroxy-15(S)-hydroxyeicosatetraenoic acid are examples of such analogs. 5-Oxo-ETE and many of its analogs are produced by human cells, other mammalian cells such as those from cats and opossums, and the cells of several species of fish. Based on the presence of its mRNA, the OXER1 receptor is assumed to be highly expressed in human blood eosinophils, neutrophils, spleen, lung, liver and kidney and at lower levels in human basophils, monocytes, lung macrophages, and various human cancer cell lines, and a cell line derived from the human adrenal cortex; however, the cells of mice and rats appear to lack a clear OXER1.

=== Other GPCR receptors ===
Mouse MA-10 cells respond to 5-oxo-ETE but lack OXER1. It has been suggested that these cells' responses to 5-oxo-ETE are mediated by an ortholog to OXER1, mouse niacin receptor 1, Niacr1, which is a G protein-coupled receptor for niacin, or, alternatively, by one or more of the mouse hydroxycarboxylic acid (HCA) family of the G protein-coupled receptors, HCA1 (GPR81), HCA2 (GPR109A), and HCA3 (GPR109B), which are G protein-coupled receptors for fatty acids.

=== PPARγ ===
5-Oxo-ETE and 5-oxo-15(S)-hydroxy-ETE but not 5-hydroxy members of the 5-HETE family such as 5-(S)-HETE activate peroxisome proliferator-activated receptor gamma (PPARγ). This activation does not proceed through OXER1; rather, it involves the direct binding of the oxo analog to PPARγ with 5-oxo-15-(S)-hydroxy-ETE being more potent than 5-oxo-ETE in binding and activating PPARγ. The Activation of OXER1 receptor and PPARγ by the oxo analogs can have opposing effects on cell function. For example, 5-oxo-ETE-bound OXER1 stimulates whereas 5-oxo-ETE-bound PPARγ inhibits the proliferation of various types of human cancer cell lines; this results in 5-oxo-ETE and 5-oxo-15-(S)-HETE having considerably less potency than anticipated in stimulating these cancer cells to proliferate relative to the potency of 5-(S)-HETE, a relationship not closely following the potencies of these three compounds in activating OXER1.

=== Other mechanisms ===
5-Oxo-ETE relaxes pre-contracted human bronchi by a mechanism that does not appear to involve OXER1 but is otherwise undefined.

== Target cells ==
=== Inflammatory cells ===
5-Oxo-ETE is a potent in vitro stimulator and/or enhancer of chemotaxis (i.e. directional migration) and, depending on the cell type, various other responses such as degranulation (i.e. release of granule-bound enzymes), oxidative metabolism (i.e. generation of reactive oxygen species), and production of mediators such as various arachidonic acid metabolites and platelet-activating factor in human eosinophils, basophils, neutrophils, and monocytes. Furthermore, the injection of 5-oxo-ETE into the skin of humans causes the local accumulation of circulating blood cells, particularly eosinophils but also to lesser extents neutrophils and monocyte-derived macrophages. The activity of 5-oxo-ETE on the two cell types known to be involved in allergy-based inflammation, eosinophils and basophils, suggests that it may be involved in promoting allergic reactions possibly by attracting through chemotaxis these cells to nascent sites of allergy and/or through stimulating these cells to release granule-bound enzymes, reactive oxygen species, or other promoters of allergic reactions. 5-Oxo-ETE's activity on human cells involved in non-allergic inflammatory diseases viz., neutrophils and monocytes, as well as its ability to attract these cell types to the skin of humans suggest that 5-oxo-ETE may also be involved in the broad category of non-allergic inflammatory diseases including those involving host defense against pathogens.

=== Lung airway smooth muscle cells ===
5-Oxo-ETE contracts smooth muscle and organ-cultured bronchi isolated from guinea pigs but relaxes bronchi isolated from human lung; the relaxation of human bronchi caused by 5-oxo-ETE may not involve its OXER1. These results suggest that 5-oxo-ETE is not directly involved in the bronchoconstriction) that occurs in eosinophil-based allergic asthma reactions in humans.

=== Cancer cells ===
5-Oxo-ETE (or other 5-HETE family member) stimulates the growth and/or survival of human cell lines derived from cancers of the prostate, breast, lung, ovary, colon and pancreas These preclinical studies suggest that 5-oxo-ETE (or other 5-HETE family member) may contribute to the cited cancers progression in humans.

=== Steroidogenic cells ===
5-oxo-ETE stimulates human H295R adrenocortical cells to increase transcription of steroidogenic acute regulatory protein messenger RNA and produce aldosterone and progesterone by an apparent OXER1-dependent pathway.

=== Other cell types ===
5-Oxo-ETE induces an isotonic volume reduction in guinea pig intestinal crypt epithelial cells.

== Interaction with other stimuli ==
5-Oxo-ETE and another potential mediator of human allergic reactions, platelet-activating factor, act in synergy to stimulate human eosinophils and neutrophils: the combined agents elicit responses that are greater than the simple sum of their individual actions and do so at relatively low. 5-Oxo-ETE also greatly increases the potencies of complement component 5a, LTB4, and FMLP in stimulating human eosinophils to degranulate and its degranulating activity is greatly increase by pretreating human eosinophils with granulocyte-macrophage colony stimulating factor or human neutrophils with either the latter cytokine or with granulocyte colony-stimulating factor, tumor necrosis factor α, or various nucleotides including ATP. Pretreament of eosinophils with interleukin 5 (a key mediator in eosinophil activation) also increases their in vitro chemotactic response to 5-oxo-ETE. 5-Oxo-ETE also acts in synergy with two chemokines, CCL2 and CCL8, in stimulating monocyte chemotaxis. The interactions of 5-oxo-ETE with these mediators of allergy (e.g. platelet-activating factor, interleukin 5) in eosinophils further suggests that it plays a role in allergic diseases while its interactions with mediators of inflammatory reactions (e.g. tumor necrosis factor α, the colony stimulating factors, and the two CCL chemokines) in neutrophils and monocytes further suggest that it plays a role in inflammatory responses and host defense mechanisms.

== Clinical significance ==
Essentially all of the studies on 5-oxo-ETE's activities and target cells, similar to those on other members of the 5(S)-HETE family of agonists, are best classified as pre-clinical development studies: they have not yet been determined to be important in human pathophysiology. Translation studies are needed to learn if the preclinical studies implicating 5-Oxo-ETE and other 5(S)-HETE family members in allergic diseases, inflammatory diseases, cancer, steroid production, bone remodeling, parturition, and other pathophysiological events, as outlined here and on the 5-HETE page, are relevant to humans and therefore of clinical significance.

=== Potential involvement in allergy ===
The clinical significance of 5-oxo-ETE has been most frequently studied as a possible mediator of eosinophil-based allergic reactions. When administered as an intradermal injection, it causes the infiltration of eosinophils at the injection site in monkeys. In humans, it induces the infiltration of eosinophils that is accompanied by significant levels of neutrophil and macrophage infiltrations. These 5-oxo-ETE injections caused a significantly larger eosinophil infiltrate in asthmatic compared to healthy humans. Studies in rhesus monkeys that were sensitized to an allergen, showed that the intradermal injection of the original allergen caused a localized accumulation of eosinophils; this infiltration was blocked by ~50% in animals pretreated with an orally taken OXER1 receptor antagonist. This same receptor antagonist likewise blocked the infiltration of eosinophils into the lung in rhesus monkeys that were sensitized to and then challenged with the original allergen. Increased levels of 5-oxo-ETE have been detected in the exhaled breath condensate of humans who developed an asthma-like bronchoconstriction response to the inhalation of house dust mite allergen: the levels of these increases were higher in individuals who developed a more severe late asthmatic response. Similarly, increased levels of 5-oxo-ETE have been detected in the bronchoalveolar lavage fluid following the inhalation of house dust mite allergen to house dust mite-sensitized mice. Finally, the epithelial cells obtained from the nasal polyps of humans produce 5-oxo-ETE and, when applied to cultures of nasal polyp tissue, 5-oxo-ETE stimulates the production of eosinophil cationic protein, a protein associated with eosinophil-based inflammation and asthma. These results indicate that: 1) 5-oxo-ETE causes skin eosinophil-based allergic-like reactions; 2) its actions, at least in monkeys, involve stimulating the OXER1; 3) 5-oxo-ETE (or a similarly acting 5-oxo-ETE analog) may contribute to human skin (e.g. atopic dermatitis), lung (e.g. asthma), and nasal (e.g. allergic rhinitis) allergic reactions; and 4) OXER1 antagonists may be useful in treating these skin, lung, and, possibly, nasal reactions in humans.

== See also ==
- ALOX15
- 5-Hydroxyeicosanoid dehydrogenase
- 5-HETE
- OXER1
