= Leukotriene A4 synthase =

Leukotriene A4 synthase may refer to the following enzymes:

- Arachidonate 5-lipoxygenase
- Arachidonate 12-lipoxygenase
