= GPR31 =

Protein in humans

Identifiers
- Aliases: GPR31, 12-HETER, HETER, HETER1, G protein-coupled receptor 31
- External IDs: OMIM: 602043; MGI: 1354372; GeneCards: GPR31

Gene location (Human)
| Chr. | Chromosome 6 (human) |
| Band | 6q27 | Start | 167,155,247 bp |
| Band | 6q27 | End | 167,157,980 bp |

Gene location (Mouse)
| Chr. | Chromosome 17 (mouse) |
| Band | 17 A1|17 8.76 cM | Start | 13,269,901 bp |
| Band | 17 A1|17 8.76 cM | End | 13,271,183 bp |
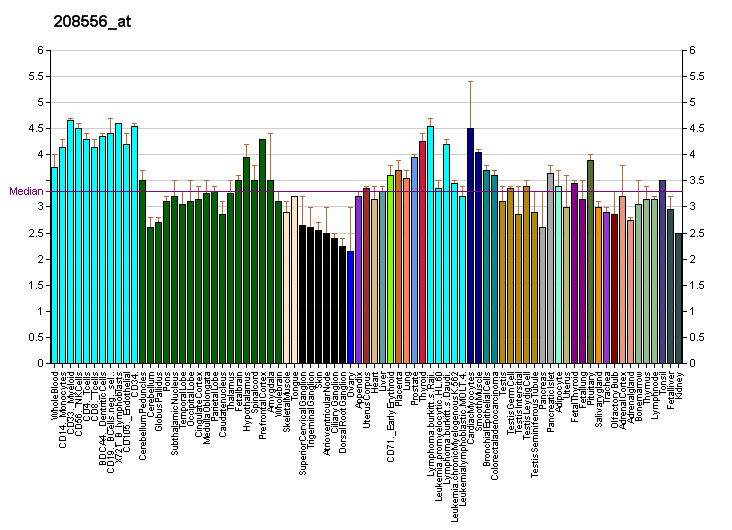
RNA expression pattern
| Bgee | Human / Mouse (ortholog); Top expressed in: lymph node; appendix; duodenum; gallbladder; rectum; tonsil; gonad; fallopian tube; spleen / Top expressed in: embryo; jejunum; adrenal gland; ileum; duodenum; muscle of thigh; islet of Langerhans; heart; More reference expression data |
| BioGPS | More reference expression data |
Gene ontology
| Molecular function | G protein-coupled receptor activity; signal transducer activity |
| Cellular component | integral component of plasma membrane; integral component of membrane; plasma membrane; membrane |
| Biological process | G protein-coupled receptor signaling pathway; signal transduction |
Sources:Amigo / QuickGO
Orthologs
| Databases | NCBI: entry; OMA: entry |
| Species | Human | Mouse |
| Entrez | 2853 | 436440 |
| Ensembl | ENSG00000120436 | ENSMUSG00000071311 |
| UniProt | O00270 | F8VQN3 |
| RefSeq (mRNA) | NM_005299 | NM_001013832 |
| RefSeq (protein) | NP_005290 | NP_001013854 |
| Location (UCSC) | Chr 6: 167.16 – 167.16 Mb | Chr 17: 13.27 – 13.27 Mb |
| PubMed search |
- Wikidata
| View/Edit Human | View/Edit Mouse |

G-protein coupled receptor 31 also known as 12-(S)-HETE receptor is a protein that in humans is encoded by the GPR31 gene. The human gene is located on chromosome 6q27 and encodes a G-protein coupled receptor protein composed of 319 amino acids.

== Function ==
The GPR31 receptor shares a close amino acid sequence similarity with the oxoeicosanoid receptor 1, a G-protein coupled receptor encoded by the GPR170 gene.

=== Ligand binding and activation ===
The oxoeicosanoid receptor 1 is the receptor for a group of arachidonic acid metabolites produced by 5-lipoxygenase, such as 5-Hydroxyicosatetraenoic acid (5-HETE), 5-oxoicosanoic acid (5-oxo-ETE), and other members of this family, which are potent bioactive cell stimuli. In contrast, the GPR31 receptor binds to a different arachidonic acid metabolite, 12-hydroxyeicosatetraenoic acid (12-HETE), synthesized by 12-lipoxygenase. This conclusion is supported by studies that cloned the receptor from the PC-3 prostate cancer cell line. The cloned receptor, when expressed in other cell types, bound 12-HETE with high affinity (Kd = 5 nM) and mediated the effects of low concentrations of the S but not R stereoisomer of 12-HETE.

In a [35S]GTPγS binding assay, which estimates a receptor's binding affinity by measuring its stimulation of [35S]GTPγS binding, 12(S)-HETE activated GPR31 with an EC50 (effective concentration causing a 50% of maximal [35S]GTPγS binding) of less than 0.3 nM. In comparison, the EC50 was 42 nM for 15(S)-HETE, 390 nM for 5(S)-HETE, and undetectable for 12(R)-HETE.

It is currently unknown whether GPR31 interacts with structural analogs of 12(S)-HETE, such as 12-oxo-ETE (a metabolite of 12(S)-HETE), various 5,12-diHETEs including LTB4, or other bioactive metabolites like the hepoxilins. Further research is required to determine whether GPR31 exclusively binds and mediates the effects of 12(S)-HETE or, like the oxoeicosanoid receptor 1, interacts with a broader family of analogs.

=== Signaling pathways ===
Like the oxoeicosanoid receptor, GPR31 activates the MEK-ERK1/2 signaling pathway, but unlike oxoeicosanoid receptor 1, it does not cause an increase in cytosolic Ca^{2+} concentration. It also activates NFκB. GPR31 exhibits stereospecificity and other properties expected of a true G-protein coupled receptor (GPCR).

=== Additional receptors activated by 12(S)-HETE ===
12(S)-HETE also: a) binds to and activates the leukotriene B4 receptor-2 (BLT2), a GPCR for the 5-lipoxygenase-derived metabolite LTB4; b) binds to, but inhibits, the GPCR for prostaglandin H2 and thromboxane A2, two arachidonic acid metabolites; c) binds with high affinity to a 50 kilodalton (kDa) subunit of a 650 kDa cytosolic and nuclear protein complex; and d) binds with low affinity to and activates intracellular peroxisome proliferator-activated receptor gamma.

=== Complications in determining GPR31 function ===
These alternate binding sites complicate the determination of 12(S)-HETE's reliance on GPR31 for cell activation and the overall function of GPR31. Studies utilizing GPR31 Gene knockout models will be crucial for understanding its role in vivo.

== Tissue distribution ==
GPR31 receptor mRNA is highly expressed in the PC-3 prostate cancer cell line and to a lesser extent the DU145 prostate cancer cell line and to human umbilical vein endothelial cells (HUVEC), human umbilical vein endothelial cells (HUVEC), human brain microvascular endothelial cells (HBMEC), and human pulmonary aortic endothelial cells (HPAC). Its mRNA is also express but at rather low levels in several other human cell lines including: K562 cells (human myelogenous leukemia cells); Jurkat cells (T lymphocyte cells); Hut78 cells (T cell lymphoma cells), HEK 293 cells (primary embryonic kidney cells), MCF-7 cells (mammary adenocarcinoma cellss), and EJ cells (bladder carcinoma cells).

Mice express an ortholog to human GPR31 in their circulating blood platelets.

== Clinical significance ==
=== Prostate cancer ===
The GPR31 receptor appears to mediate the responses of PC-3 prostate cancer cells to 12(S)-HETE in stimulating the MEK-ERK1/2 and NFκB pathways and therefore may contribute to the growth-promoting and metastasis-promoting actions that 12(S)-HETE is proposed to have in human prostate cancer. However, LNCaP and PC3 human prostate cancer cells also express BLT2 receptors; in LNCaP cells, BLT2 receptors stimulate the expression of the growth- and metastasis-promoting androgen receptor; in PC3 cells, BLT2 receptors stimulate the NF-κB pathway to inhibit the apoptosis induced by cell detachment from surfaces (i.e. Anoikis; and, in BLT2-overexpressing PWR-1E non-malignant prostate cells, 12(S)-HETE diminished anoikis-associated apoptotic cell death. Thus, the roles of 12(S)-HETE in human prostate cancer, if any, may involve its activation of either or both GPR31 and BLT2 receptors.

=== Other diseases ===
The many other actions of 12(S)-HETE (see 12-Hydroxyeicosatetraenoic acid) and any other ligands found to interact with this receptor will require studies similar those conducted on PC3 cells and mesenteric arteries to determine the extent to which they interact with BLT2, TXA2/PGH2, and PPARgamma receptors and thereby may contribute in part or whole to their activity. Clues implicating the GPR31, as opposed to the other receptors in the actions of 12(S)-HETE include findings that GPR31 receptors do not respond to 12(R)-HETE nor induce rises in cytosolic Ca2+ whereas the other receptors mediate one or both of these actions. These studies will be important because, in addition to prostate cancer, preliminary studies suggest that the GPR31 receptor is implicated in several other diseases such as malignant megakaryocytis (Acute megakaryoblastic leukemia), arthritis, Alzheimer's disease, progressive B-cell chronic lymphocytic leukemia, Diabetic neuropathy, and high grade astrocytoma.
