= SW209415 =

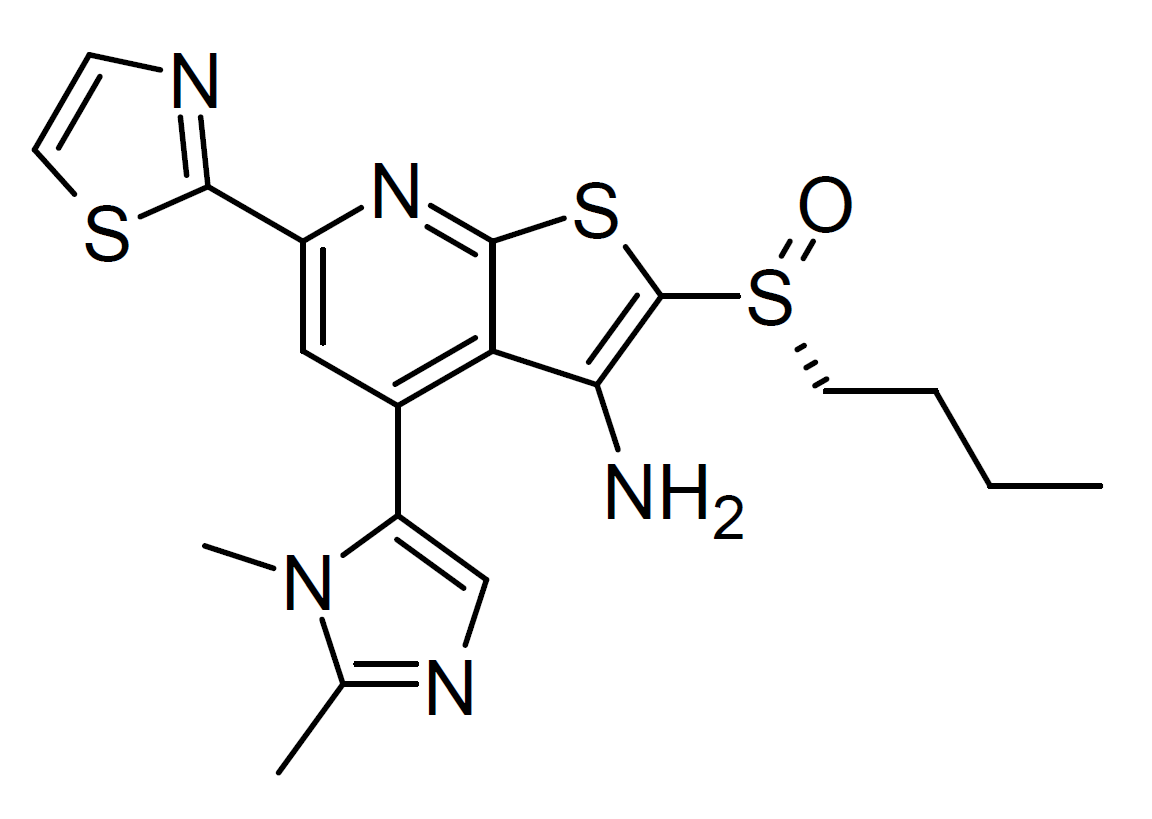

Clinical data
- Drug class: 15-PGDH inhibitor

Identifiers
- IUPAC name: (R)-2-(butylsulfinyl)-4-(1,2-dimethyl-1H-imidazol-5-yl)-6-(thiazol-2-yl)thieno[2,3-b]pyridin-3-amine
- PubChem CID: 129281194
- ChemSpider: 76789060
- ChEMBL: ChEMBL4070789

Chemical and physical data
- Formula: C_{19}H_{21}N_{5}OS_{3}
- Molar mass: 431.59 g·mol^{−1}
- 3D model (JSmol): Interactive image
- SMILES: Cn1c(cnc1C)c1cc(nc2sc([S@](=O)CCCC)c(N)c21)c1sccn1
- InChI: InChI=1S/C19H21N5OS3/c1-4-5-8-28(25)19-16(20)15-12(14-10-22-11(2)24(14)3)9-13(23-18(15)27-19)17-21-6-7-26-17/h6-7,9-10H,4-5,8,20H2,1-3H3/t28-/m1/s1; Key:LKPKDKDBZLBUIC-MUUNZHRXSA-N

SW209415 is a drug that acts as a potent inhibitor of the enzyme 15-hydroxyprostaglandin dehydrogenase (15-PGDH), which increases levels of prostaglandin E2 and promotes tissue regeneration. The (R) or (+) enantiomer is the more active. It has similar potency in vitro to the earlier and better studied related compound SW033291, but its solubility is far higher and its pharmacokinetic properties and bioavailability significantly improved, making it more suitable for development for potential clinical applications. It is being researched for improved healing of broken bones and accelerating recovery from bone marrow transplant.
