= Onvoloxastat =

Clinical data
- Other names: CAD-1005; CAD1005; VLX-1005; VLX1005; ML355; ML-355
- Routes of administration: Oral
- Drug class: 12-Lipoxygenase inhibitor

Identifiers
- IUPAC name: N-(1,3-benzothiazol-2-yl)-4-[(2-hydroxy-3-methoxyphenyl)methylamino]benzenesulfonamide
- CAS Number: 1532593-30-8
- PubChem CID: 70701426
- IUPHAR/BPS: 8752
- DrugBank: DB18307
- UNII: JKU4XCC48Y
- ChEBI: CHEBI:195557
- ChEMBL: ChEMBL3113165
- PDB ligand: ZR5 (PDBe, RCSB PDB)

Chemical and physical data
- Formula: C_{21}H_{19}N_{3}O_{4}S_{2}
- Molar mass: 441.52 g·mol^{−1}
- 3D model (JSmol): Interactive image
- SMILES: COC1=CC=CC(=C1O)CNC2=CC=C(C=C2)S(=O)(=O)NC3=NC4=CC=CC=C4S3
- InChI: InChI=1S/C21H19N3O4S2/c1-28-18-7-4-5-14(20(18)25)13-22-15-9-11-16(12-10-15)30(26,27)24-21-23-17-6-2-3-8-19(17)29-21/h2-12,22,25H,13H2,1H3,(H,23,24); Key:OWHBVKBNNRYMIN-UHFFFAOYSA-N

Onvoloxastat (INN; developmental code names CAD-1005, VLX-1005, and ML355) is a 12-lipoxygenase (12-LOX; ALOX12) inhibitor which is under development for the treatment of heparin-induced thrombocytopenia and thrombosis syndrome (HITTS), acute kidney injury, and diabetes. It is taken orally.

== Pharmacology ==
The drug is a potent, highly selective, non-competitive, and reversible 12-LOX inhibitor (IC_{50} = 340 nM). It shows anti-inflammatory, antiplatelet, and antithrombotic effects in preclinical research. 12-LOX has been found to play a key role in the hyperinflammation induced by severe SARS-CoV-2 infection and onvoloxastat can reduce these responses and improve survival in rodents. The drug also antagonizes lipopolysaccharide (LPS)-induced inflammation.

== History ==
Onvoloxastat was first described in the scientific literature by 2010. It was developed by Cadrenal Therapeutics and Veralox Therapeutics, among other organizations. As of July 2026, the drug is in phase 2 clinical trials for HITTS and is in the preclinical research stage of development for acute kidney injury, type 1 diabetes, and type 2 diabetes. It was among the first selective 12-LOX inhibitors to be discovered and has been described as the "state-of-the-art" inhibitor of this enzyme.
