= SW033291 =

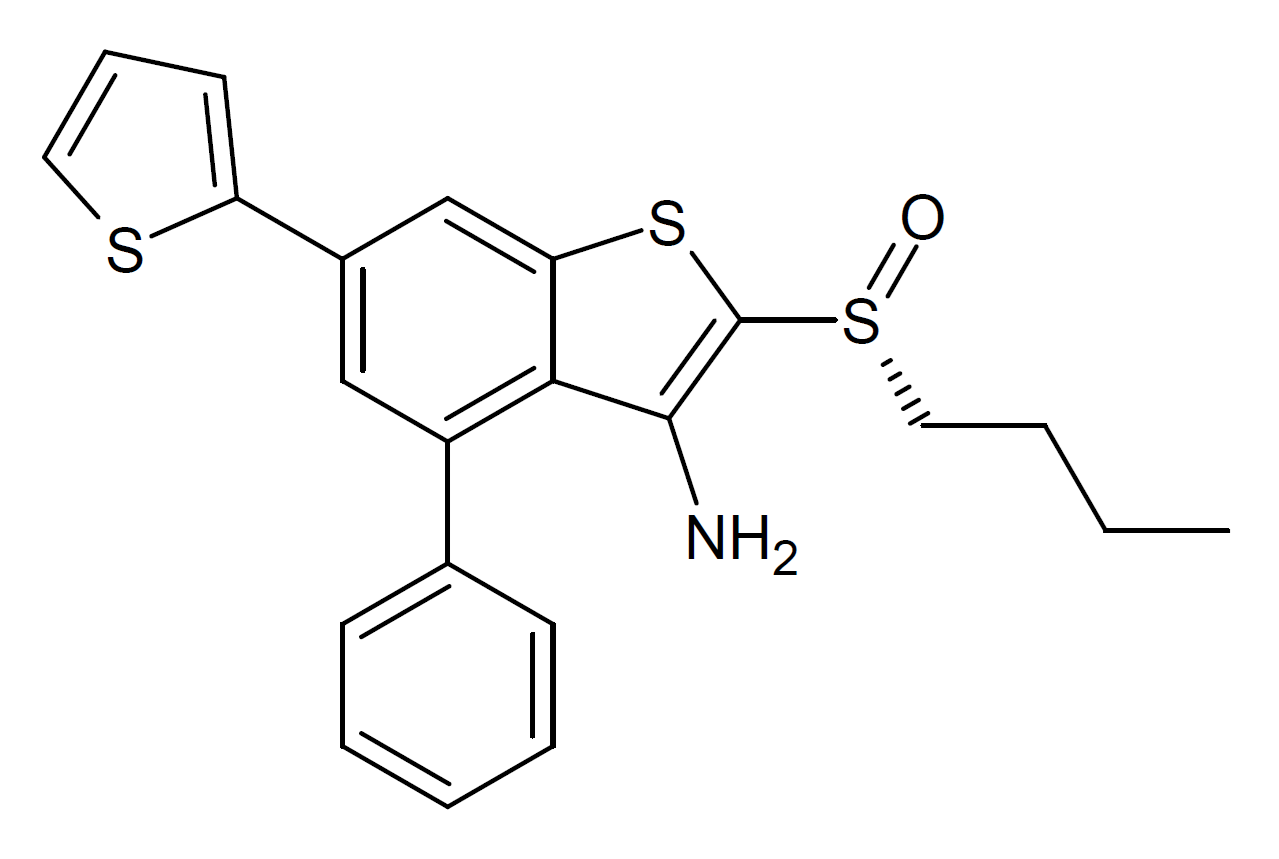

Clinical data
- Drug class: 15-PGDH inhibitor

Identifiers
- IUPAC name: 2-butylsulfinyl-4-phenyl-6-thiophen-2-yl-1-benzothiophen-3-amine
- CAS Number: 459147-39-8 1714961-54-2 (R enantiomer)
- PubChem CID: 117944082

Chemical and physical data
- Formula: C_{22}H_{21}NOS_{3}
- Molar mass: 411.60 g·mol^{−1}
- 3D model (JSmol): Interactive image
- SMILES: CCCCS(=O)C1=C(C2=C(C=C(C=C2S1)C3=CC=CS3)C4=CC=CC=C4)N
- InChI: InChI=1S/C22H21NOS3/c1-2-3-12-27(24)22-21(23)20-17(15-8-5-4-6-9-15)13-16(14-19(20)26-22)18-10-7-11-25-18/h4-11,13-14H,2-3,12,23H2,1H3; Key:KLWRXRJDKBUYCJ-UHFFFAOYSA-N

SW033291 (PGDHi) is a drug which acts as a potent inhibitor of the enzyme 15-hydroxyprostaglandin dehydrogenase (15-PGDH). The (R) or (+) enantiomer is more active, though much of the earlier research used the racemic mix. It increases levels of prostaglandin E2 and promotes tissue regeneration, and has shown beneficial effects for numerous potential medical applications in animal studies, including recovery from bone marrow transplant, acute kidney injury, liver damage, diabetes, heart failure, cartilage regrowth, sarcopenia, and neurological conditions such as Alzheimer's disease and traumatic brain injury.

== See also ==
- SW209415
