= SW222746 =

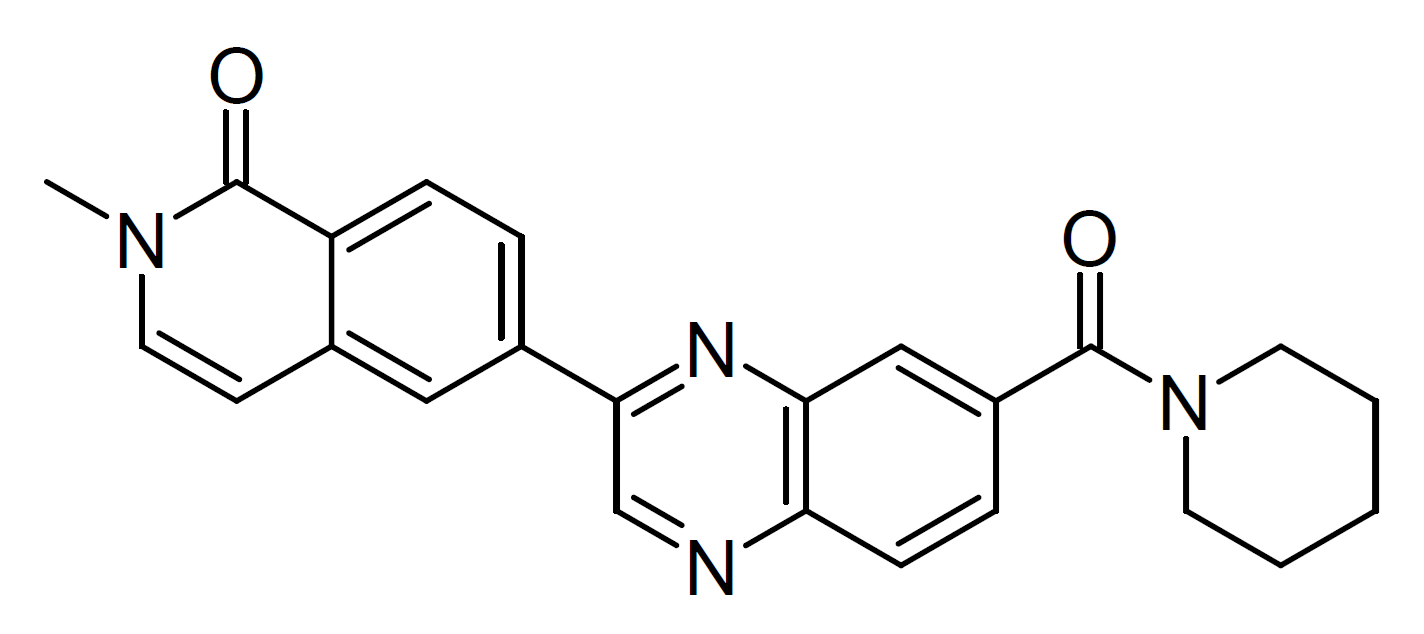

Clinical data
- Drug class: 15-PGDH inhibitor

Identifiers
- IUPAC name: 2-methyl-6-[7-(piperidine-1-carbonyl)quinoxalin-2-yl]isoquinolin-1-one
- CAS Number: 2241676-74-2
- PubChem CID: 135300446
- ChemSpider: 128921368
- ChEMBL: ChEMBL5220884
- PDB ligand: RLD (PDBe, RCSB PDB)

Chemical and physical data
- Formula: C_{24}H_{22}N_{4}O_{2}
- Molar mass: 398.466 g·mol^{−1}
- 3D model (JSmol): Interactive image
- SMILES: CN1C=CC2=C(C1=O)C=CC(=C2)C3=CN=C4C=CC(=CC4=N3)C(=O)N5CCCCC5
- InChI: InChI=1S/C24H22N4O2/c1-27-12-9-16-13-17(5-7-19(16)24(27)30)22-15-25-20-8-6-18(14-21(20)26-22)23(29)28-10-3-2-4-11-28/h5-9,12-15H,2-4,10-11H2,1H3; Key:URHPFANOQLIROT-UHFFFAOYSA-N

SW222746 is a drug which acts as a potent inhibitor of the enzyme 15-hydroxyprostaglandin dehydrogenase (15-PGDH). It increases levels of prostaglandin E2 and stimulates tissue regeneration, and has good oral bioavailability. It has been researched in animal studies for treatment of muscle wasting in the elderly.
