= ML148 =

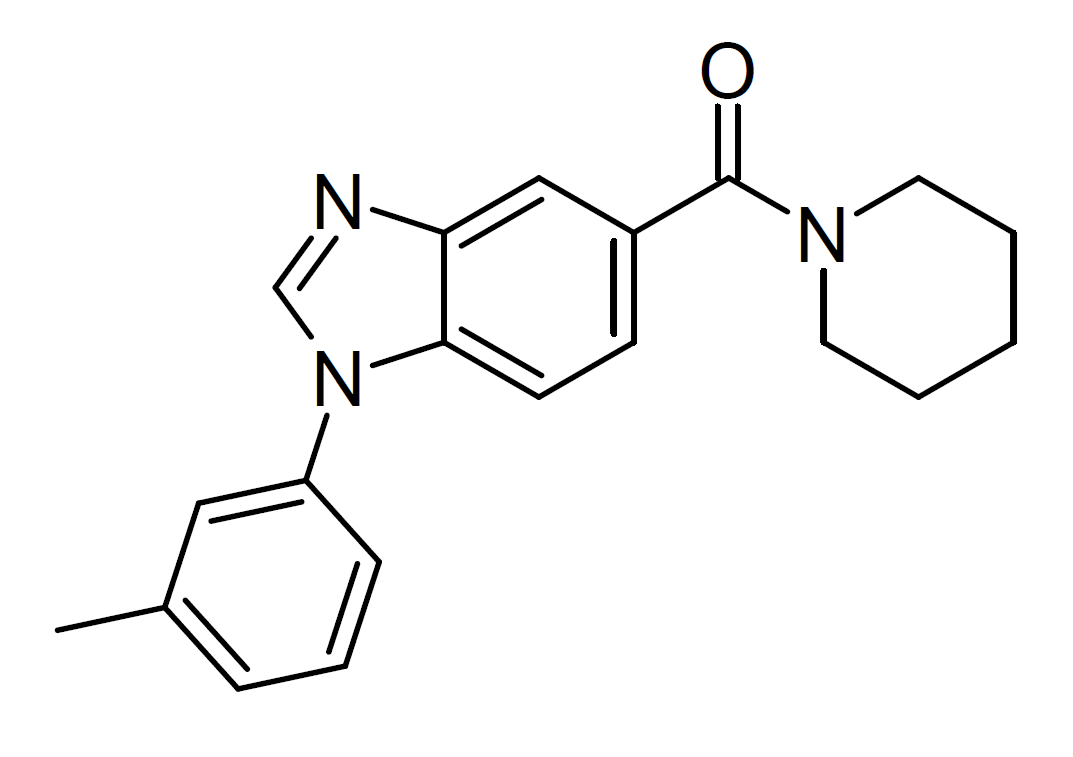

Clinical data
- Drug class: 15-PGDH inhibitor

Identifiers
- IUPAC name: [1-(3-methylphenyl)benzimidazol-5-yl]-piperidin-1-ylmethanone
- CAS Number: 451496-96-1
- PubChem CID: 3243760
- ChemSpider: 2494586
- ChEBI: CHEBI:92799
- ChEMBL: ChEMBL1343061

Chemical and physical data
- Formula: C_{20}H_{21}N_{3}O
- Molar mass: 319.408 g·mol^{−1}
- 3D model (JSmol): Interactive image
- SMILES: CC1=CC(=CC=C1)N2C=NC3=C2C=CC(=C3)C(=O)N4CCCCC4
- InChI: InChI=1S/C20H21N3O/c1-15-6-5-7-17(12-15)23-14-21-18-13-16(8-9-19(18)23)20(24)22-10-3-2-4-11-22/h5-9,12-14H,2-4,10-11H2,1H3; Key:YQNOQZALLOQMPY-UHFFFAOYSA-N

ML148 is a drug which acts as a reasonably potent and selective inhibitor of the enzyme 15-hydroxyprostaglandin dehydrogenase (15-PGDH), with an IC_{50} of 56 nM. It increases levels of prostaglandin E2 and stimulates tissue regeneration. It was one of the earliest selective 15-PGDH inhibitors developed, and is now mainly significant as a lead compound which was used to develop more potent derivatives such as HW201877, but is still used in research as its simple chemical structure and straightforward synthesis makes it a cost-effective alternative to more complex compounds.
