= HW201877 =

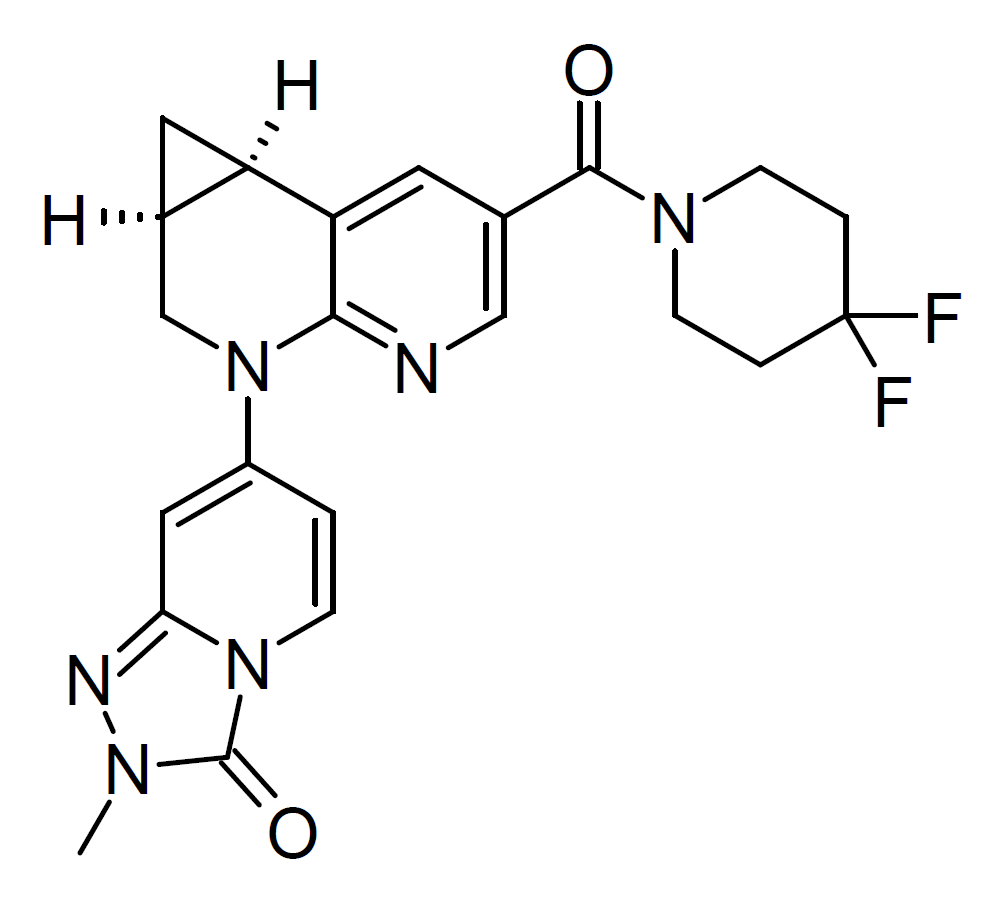

Clinical data
- Drug class: 15-PGDH inhibitor

Identifiers
- IUPAC name: 7-[(1aS,7bR)-6-(4,4-difluoropiperidine-1-carbonyl)-1,1a,2,7b-tetrahydro-3H-cyclopropa[c][1,8]naphthyridin-3-yl]-2-methyl[1,2,4]triazolo[4,3-a]pyridin-3(2H)-one
- CAS Number: 2927452-83-1
- PubChem CID: 169836897
- ChemSpider: 133325048

Chemical and physical data
- Formula: C_{22}H_{22}F_{2}N_{6}O_{2}
- Molar mass: 440.455 g·mol^{−1}
- 3D model (JSmol): Interactive image
- SMILES: O=C1N2C=CC(=CC2=NN1C)N1C[C@H]2C[C@H]2c2cc(cnc12)C(=O)N1CCC(F)(F)CC1
- InChI: InChI=1S/C22H22F2N6O2/c1-27-21(32)29-5-2-15(10-18(29)26-27)30-12-14-9-16(14)17-8-13(11-25-19(17)30)20(31)28-6-3-22(23,24)4-7-28/h2,5,8,10-11,14,16H,3-4,6-7,9,12H2,1H3/t14-,16-/m1/s1; Key:KDAKIHHOWNCOTC-GDBMZVCRSA-N

HW201877 is a drug which acts as a potent inhibitor of the enzyme 15-hydroxyprostaglandin dehydrogenase (15-PGDH). It increases levels of prostaglandin E2 and stimulates tissue regeneration, and has been researched in animal studies for treatment of conditions such as inflammatory bowel disease and idiopathic pulmonary fibrosis.
