= 15-hydroxyicosatetraenoate dehydrogenase =

Class of enzymes

Identifiers
- EC no.: 1.1.1.232
- CAS no.: 117910-46-0

Databases
- IntEnz: IntEnz view
- BRENDA: BRENDA entry
- ExPASy: NiceZyme view
- KEGG: KEGG entry
- MetaCyc: metabolic pathway
- PRIAM: profile
- PDB structures: RCSB PDB PDBe PDBsum
- Gene Ontology: AmiGO / QuickGO
Search
- PMC: articles
- PubMed: articles
- NCBI: proteins

In enzymology, a 15-hydroxyicosatetraenoate dehydrogenase (EC 1.1.1.232) is an enzyme that catalyzes the chemical reaction

(15S)-15-hydroxy-5,8,11-cis-13-trans-icosatetraenoate + NAD(P)+ $\rightleftharpoons$ 15-oxo-5,8,11-cis-13-trans-icosatetraenoate + NAD(P)H + H^{+}

The 3 substrates of this enzyme are 15-hydroxyicosatetraenoic acid (i.e. 15(S)-15-hydroxy-5,8,11-cis-13-trans-icosatetraenoate), NAD^{+}, and NADP^{+}, whereas its 4 products are 15-oxo-5,8,11-cis-13-trans-icosatetraenoate, NADH, NADPH, and H^{+}.

This enzyme belongs to the family of oxidoreductases, specifically those acting on the CH-OH group of donor with NAD^{+} or NADP^{+} as acceptor. The systematic name of this enzyme class is (15S)-15-hydroxy-5,8,11-cis-13-trans-icosatetraenoate:NAD(P)^{+} 15-oxidoreductase. This enzyme is also called 15-hydroxyeicosatetraenoate dehydrogenase. This enzyme participates in arachidonic acid metabolism.
