= Endothelium-derived hyperpolarizing factor =

In blood vessels Endothelium-Derived Hyperpolarizing Factor or EDHF is proposed to be a substance and/or electrical signal that is generated or synthesized in and released from the endothelium; its action is to hyperpolarize vascular smooth muscle cells, causing these cells to relax, thus allowing the blood vessel to expand in diameter.

== Introduction ==
The endothelium maintains vascular homeostasis through the release of active vasodilators. Although nitric oxide (NO) is recognized as the primary factor at level of arteries, increased evidence for the role of another endothelium-derived vasodilator known as endothelium-derived hyperpolarizing factor (EDHF) has accumulated in the last years. Experiments show that when NO and prostacyclin (vasodilators) are inhibited there is still another factor causing the vessels to dilate Despite the ongoing debate of its intriguingly variable nature and mechanisms of action, the contribution of EDHF to the endothelium-dependent relaxation is currently appreciated as an important feature of “healthy” endothelium. Since EDHF's contribution is greatest at level of small arteries, the changes in the EDHF action are of critical importance for the regulation of organ blood flow, peripheral vascular resistance, and blood pressure, and in particular when production of NO is compromised. Moreover, depending on the type of cardiovascular disorders altered, EDHF responses may contribute to, or compensate for, endothelial abnormalities associated with pathogenesis of certain diseases. It is widely accepted EDHF plays an important role in vasotone, especially in micro vessels. Its effect varies, depending on the size of the vessel.

=== Pathways of EDHF ===
There are two general pathways that explain EDH

- Diffusible factors are endothelium-derived substances that are able to pass through internal elastic lamina (IEL), reach underlying vascular smooth muscle cells at a concentration sufficient to activate ion channels, and initiate smooth muscle hyperpolarization and relaxation.
- Contact-mediated mechanisms bestow endothelial hyperpolarization that passively spreads to the smooth muscle through inter-cellular coupling, and, therefore, EDH is considered as a solely electrical event.

== Discovering the chemical identity ==
Although the phenomenon of EDHF has been observed and reported in scientific literature, to date the chemical identity of the factor(s) has not been determined.

- In some cases, members of a class of arachidonic acid derivatives, the epoxyeicosatrienoic acids (EETs), have been found to mediate the vasodilation. These compounds are formed by epoxidation of any one of four double bonds of the arachidonic acid carbon backbone by cytochrome P450 epoxygenase enzymes.
- In addition, in some cases hydrogen peroxide has been suggested to function as an EDHF in some vascular beds; although the validity of this observation is debated because it may have an inhibitory action on K+ channels, at least, in some vascular beds.
- It has been suggested that EDHF is potassium ions (K^{+}), as the activation of endothelial K-Ca^{+} channels causes an efflux of K^{+} from endothelial cells toward the extracellular space. An increase in extracellular K^{+} has been shown to activate an ouabain-sensitive electrogenic Na^{+}–K^{+}-ATPase followed by hyperpolarization and smooth muscle cell relaxation. However, the involvement of K^{+} ions in EDHF-mediated relaxation does not necessarily involve the activation Na^{+}–K^{+}-ATPase channels. It is more likely that K^{+} ions and gap junctions can be involved in EDHF-mediated relaxation simultaneously, and may also act synergistically.
- Subsequently, it was suggested that EDHF is a sulfur signal that results in activation of K channels via sulfhydration of a cysteine residue (formation of a cysteine persulfide) (https://doi.org/10.1161/CIRCRESAHA.111.240242)
- C-type natriuretic peptide (CNP) has been shown to exert a variety of cardiovascular effects including vasodilation and hyperpolarization of arteries through the opening of K_{Ca}^{+}-channels. CNP is widely distributed in the cardiovascular system and it has been found at high concentrations, in particular in endothelial cells. Endothelium-derived CNP has been proposed to act as an EDHF via specific C-subtype of natriuretic peptide receptor, however the evidence in favour of CNP's acting as EDHF has yet to be determined.
- An alternative explanation for the EDHF phenomenon is that direct intercellular communication via gap junctions allows passive spread of agonist-induced endothelial hyperpolarization through the vessel wall. In some arteries, eicosanoids and K+ ions may themselves initiate a conducted endothelial hyperpolarization, thus suggesting that electrotonic signalling may represent a general mechanism through which the endothelium participates in the regulation of vascular tone.

== EDHF and hypertension ==
Recently, EDHF has been implicated in gender-related differences in blood pressure control. The generation of animals that lack both endothelial nitric oxide synthase (eNOS) and COX-1 (Cyclooxygenase-1, a protein that acts as an enzyme to speed up the production of certain chemical messengers), has allowed a direct assessment of the involvement of EDHF to endothelium-dependent relaxation in small arteries. In mice lacking both eNOS and COX-1, EDHF-mediated response appeared to compensate the absence of endothelial NO in females but not in males. In female mice, the deletion of eNOS and COX-1 did not affect mean arterial blood pressure, while males become hypertensive. In accordance with this study, EDHF has been suggested to be more important in female arteries to confer endothelium-dependent dilatation, while NO played a predominant role in arteries from males. The latter finding indeed concurs with previous reports in several vascular beds, including mesenteric and tail arteries from rats as well as genital arteries from rabbits. These findings together suggest that under pathological conditions EDHF could compensate for the loss of NO in female rather than in male arteries

== Summary ==
Based on current evidence, the term of endothelium-derived hyperpolarising factor should represent a mechanism rather than a specific factor. The mechanism(s) of endothelium-dependent hyperpolarization (i.e., EDHF-mediated relaxation) seems to be heterogeneous depending on several factors (e.g., size and vascular bed), surrounding environment (oxidative stress, hypercholesterolemia) and demand (compensatory). Different endothelial mediators or pathways involved in EDHF-mediated relaxation may also work simultaneously and/or substitute each other. It implies a reasonable physiological sense, although to some extent and when EDHF acts as backup mechanism for endothelium-dependent relaxation in the presence of compromised NO contribution. Thus, alternatives for EDHF-typed responses (H_{2}O_{2}, K^{+} etc.) will provide a guarantee for compensation of endothelial function. However, once the involvement of a certain endothelium-derived vasodilator for a given vascular bed is confirmed, it is preferred that they be described by their proper name (i.e., endothelium-derived H_{2}O_{2}, or CNP), and no longer be termed as “EDHF”. Although the role of EDHF in the genesis of Cardiovascular Disease remains to be further elucidated, the EDHF contribution and its importance at the level of small arteries delivers a theoretical opportunity to control systemic blood pressure. There is an increasing experimental evidence to suggest that treatment of the EDHF system could provide a means to control blood pressure and blood flow to target organs in compatible way achieved by manipulations of NO system.

Since “EDHF story” is particularly heterogeneous and based mainly on animal studies, the most important and demanding current task is to strengthen our knowledge about EDHF action in human arteries in health and disease.

== See also ==
- Endothelium-derived relaxing factor
