= Oxoeicosanoid receptor 1 =

Protein-coding gene in the species Homo sapiens

OXER1

Identifiers
- Aliases: OXER1, GPCR, GPR170, TG1019, oxoeicosanoid (OXE) receptor 1, oxoeicosanoid receptor 1
- External IDs: GeneCards: OXER1

Gene location (Human)
Chr.	Chromosome 2 (human)
Band	2p21	Start	42,762,499 bp
Band	2p21	End	42,764,135 bp
RNA expression pattern
Bgee	Human / Mouse (ortholog); Top expressed in: right lobe of liver; mucosa of transverse colon; blood; right ovary; granulocyte; left ovary; monocyte; body of pancreas; ascending aorta; human kidney / n/a; More reference expression data
BioGPS	n/a
Gene ontology
Molecular function	signal transducer activity; G protein-coupled receptor activity; 5-oxo-6E,8Z,11Z,14Z-icosatetraenoic acid binding; 5-hydroxy-6E,8Z,11Z,14Z-icosatetraenoic acid binding; 5(S)-hydroxyperoxy-6E,8Z,11Z,14Z-icosatetraenoic acid binding
Cellular component	integral component of membrane; plasma membrane; membrane
Biological process	signal transduction; G protein-coupled receptor signaling pathway; adenylate cyclase-inhibiting G protein-coupled receptor signaling pathway
Sources:Amigo / QuickGO
Orthologs
Databases	NCBI: entry; OMA: entry
Species	Human	Mouse
Entrez	165140	n/a
Ensembl	ENSG00000162881	n/a
UniProt	Q8TDS5	n/a
RefSeq (mRNA)	NM_148962	n/a
RefSeq (protein)	NP_683765	n/a
Location (UCSC)	Chr 2: 42.76 – 42.76 Mb	n/a
PubMed search		n/a
- Wikidata
View/Edit Human

Oxoeicosanoid receptor 1 (OXER1) also known as G-protein coupled receptor 170 (GPR170) is a protein that in humans is encoded by the OXER1 gene located on human chromosome 2p21; it is the principal receptor for the 5-Hydroxyicosatetraenoic acid family of carboxy fatty acid metabolites derived from arachidonic acid. The receptor has also been termed hGPCR48, HGPCR48, and R527 but OXER1 is now its preferred designation. OXER1 is a G protein-coupled receptor (GPCR) that is structurally related to the hydroxy-carboxylic acid (HCA) family of G protein-coupled receptors whose three members are HCA1 (GPR81), HCA2 (Niacin receptor 1), and HCA3 (Niacin receptor 2); OXER1 has 30.3%, 30.7%, and 30.7% amino acid sequence identity with these GPCRs, respectively. It is also related (30.4% amino acid sequence identity) to the recently defined receptor, GPR31, for the hydroxyl-carboxy fatty acid 12-HETE.

== Species and tissue distribution ==
Orthologs of OXER1 are found in various mammalian species including opossums and several species of fish; however, mice and rats lack a clear ortholog of OXER1. This represents an important hindrance to studies on the function of OXER1 since these two mammalian species are the most common and easiest models for investigating the in vivo functions of receptors in mammals and by extrapolation humans. Since mouse cells make and respond to members of the 5-HETE family of agonists, it is most likely that mice do have a receptor that substitutes for OXER1 by mediating their responses to this agonist family. Recently, A G protein-couple receptor of the hydroxy carboxylic acid subfamily, Niacin receptor 1, has been proposed to mediate the responses of mouse tissues to 5-oxo-ETE.

OXER1 is highly expressed by human white blood cells, particularly eosinophils and to a lesser extent neutrophils, basophils, and monocytes; by bronchoalveolar macrophages isolated from human bronchoalveolar lavage washings; and by the human H295R adrenocortical cell line. Various types of human cancer cells lines express OXER1; these include those of the prostate, breast, lung, ovaries, colon, and pancreas. OXER1 is also expressed by the human spleen, lung, liver, and kidney tissues. The exact cell types bearing OXER1 in these tissues has not been defined.

A recent study has found that cats express the OXER1 receptor for 5-oxo-ETE, that feline leukocytes, including eosinophils, have been found to synthesize and be very highly responsive to 5-oxo-ETE, and that 5-oxo-ETE is present in the bronchoalveolar lavage fluid from cats with experimentally induced asthma; these findings suggest that the 5-oxo-ETE/OXER1 axis may play an important role in feline asthma, a common condition in this species, and that felines could serve as a useful animal model to investigate the pathophysiological role of 5-oxo-ETE in asthma and other conditions.

== Ligands ==
The OXER1 G protein-coupled receptor resembles the hydroxy carboxylic acid subfamily of G protein-coupled receptors, which besides GPR109A, niacin receptor 1, and niacin receptor 2 may include the recently defined receptor for 12-HETE, GPR31, not only in its amino acid sequence but also in the hydroxy-carboxylic acid nature of its cognate ligands. Naturally occurring ligands for OXER1 are long chain polyunsaturated fatty acids containing either a hydroxyl (i.e. -OH) or oxo (i.e. =O, keto) residue removed by 5 carbons from each of these acid's carboxy residue.

=== Agonists ===
OXER1 is known or presumed to bind and thereby be activated by the following endogenous arachidonic acid metabolites; 5-oxo-ETE>5-oxo-15-hydroxy-ETE>5-hydroperoxyicosatetraenoic acid (5-HpETE)>5-HETE>5,20-diHETE. OXER1 is also activated by metabolites of other polyunsaturated fatty acids that therefore may be categorized as members of the 5-oxo-ETE family of agonists; these agonists include 5(S)-oxo-6E,8Z,11Z-eicosatrienoic acid (a 5-LO metabolite of mead acid); 5(S)-hydroxy-6E,8Z-octadecadienoic acid and 5(S)-oxo-6E,8Z-octadecadienoic acid (5-LO metabolites of sebaleic acid, i.e. 5Z,8Z-octadecadienoic acid); and 5(S)-hydroxy-6E,8Z,11Z,14Z,17Z-eicosapentaenoic and 5-oxo-6E,8Z,11Z,14Z,17Z-eicosapentaenoic acids (5-LO metabolites of the n-3 polyunsaturated fatty acid, eicosapentaenoic acid).

=== Antagonists ===
5-Oxo-12(S)-hydroxy-HETE and its 8-trans isomer, 5-oxo-12(S)-hydroxy-6E,8E,11Z,14Z-eicosatetraenoic acid, and a series of synthetic mimetics of 5-oxo-ETE structure (compounds 346, S-264, S-230, Gue154, and still to be named but considerably more potent drugs than these) block the activity of 5-oxo-ETE but not other stimuli in leukocytes and are presumed to be OXER1 antagonists.

== Mechanisms of activating cells ==
OXE-R couples to the G protein complex Gαi-Gβγ; when bound to a 5-oxo-ETE family member, OXE-R triggers this G protein complex to dissociate into its Gαi and Gβγ components. Gβγ appears to be the component most responsible for activating many of the signal pathways that lead to cellular functional responses. Intracellular cell-activation pathways stimulated by OXER1 include those involving rises in cytosolic calcium ion levels, and along with others that lead to the activation of MAPK/ERK, p38 mitogen-activated protein kinases, cytosolic Phospholipase A2, PI3K/Akt, and protein kinase C beta (i.e. PRKCB1, delta (i.e. PRKCD), epsilon (i.e. PRKCE), and zeta (i.e. PRKCZ).

== Function ==
OXER1 is activated by 5-oxo-ETE, 5-HETE, and other members of the 5-Hydroxyicosatetraenoic acid family of arachidonic acid metabolites and thereby mediates this family's stimulatory effects on cell types that are involved in mediating immunity-based inflammatory reactions such as neutrophils, monocytes, and macrophages) as well as allergic reactions such as eosinophils and basophils. It also mediates the in vitro proliferation and other pro-malignant responses of cultured prostate, breast, ovary, and kidney cancer cells to the 5-HETE family of agonists. These studies suggest that OXER1 may be involved in orchestrating inflammatory and allergic responses in humans and contribute to the growth and spread of human prostate, breast, ovary, and kidney cancers. OXER1 is responsible for steroid production response to 5-oxo-ETE by human steroidogenic cells in vitro and therefore could be involved in steroid production in humans.

To date, however, all studies have been pre-clinical; they use model systems that can suggest but not prove the contribution of OXER1 to human physiology and diseases. The most well-studied and promising area for OXER1 function is in allergic reactions. The recent development of OXER1 antagonists will help address this issue.

== See also ==
- Eicosanoid receptor
- 5-Hydroxyicosatetraenoic acid and 5-oxo-eicosatetraenoic acid
- Niacin receptor 1
