= 15-hydroxyprostaglandin dehydrogenase (NADP+) =

Enzyme

15-hydroxyprostaglandin dehydrogenase (NADP^{+})

Identifiers
- EC no.: 1.1.1.197
- CAS no.: 54989-39-8

Databases
- IntEnz: IntEnz view
- BRENDA: BRENDA entry
- ExPASy: NiceZyme view
- KEGG: KEGG entry
- MetaCyc: metabolic pathway
- PRIAM: profile
- PDB structures: RCSB PDB PDBe PDBsum
- Gene Ontology: AmiGO / QuickGO
Search
- PMC: articles
- PubMed: articles
- NCBI: proteins

In enzymology, 15-hydroxyprostaglandin dehydrogenase (NADP^{+}) (EC 1.1.1.197) is an enzyme that catalyzes the chemical reaction

prostaglandin E1
+ NADP^{+}
H^{+}
H^{+}
15-oxoprostaglandin E1
+ NADPH

The two substrates of this enzyme are prostaglandin E_{1} and oxidised nicotinamide adenine dinucleotide phosphate (NADP^{+}). Its products are 15-oxoprostaglandin E_{1}, reduced NADPH, and proton.

This enzyme belongs to the family of oxidoreductases, specifically those acting on the CH-OH group of donor with NAD^{+} or NADP^{+} as acceptor. The systematic name of this enzyme class is (13E)-(15S)-11alpha,15-dihydroxy-9-oxoprost-13-enoate:NADP^{+} 15-oxidoreductase. Other names in common use include NADP^{+}-dependent 15-hydroxyprostaglandin dehydrogenase, NADP^{+}-linked 15-hydroxyprostaglandin dehydrogenase, NADP^{+}-specific 15-hydroxyprostaglandin dehydrogenase, type II 15-hydroxyprostaglandin dehydrogenase, and 15-hydroxyprostaglandin dehydrogenase (NADP^{+}).

== Structural studies ==
As of late 2007, only one structure has been solved for this class of enzymes, with the PDB accession code 2PFG.
