= 15-hydroxyprostaglandin dehydrogenase (NAD+) =

Class of enzymes

hydroxyprostaglandin dehydrogenase 15-(NAD)
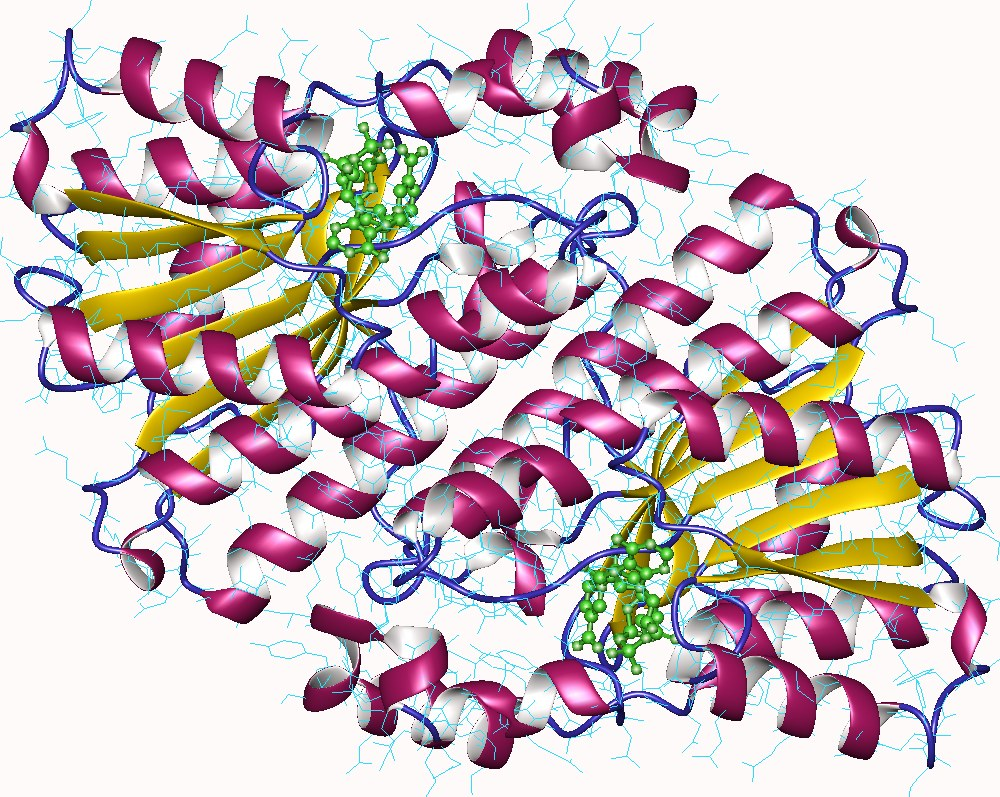
- 15-hydroxyprostaglandin dehydrogenase dimer (NAD dependent), Human

Identifiers
- EC no.: 1.1.1.141
- CAS no.: 9030-87-9

Databases
- BRENDA: enzyme data
- ExPASy: NiceZyme view
- KEGG: enzyme entry
- MetaCyc: metabolic pathway
- Rhea: reactions
- PDB structures: RCSB PDB PDBe PDBsum
- Gene Ontology: AmiGO / QuickGO
Search
- PMC: articles
- PubMed: articles
- NCBI: proteins

Hydroxyprostaglandin dehydrogenase 15-(NAD) (the HUGO-approved symbol = HPGD; HGNC ID, HGNC:5154), also called 15-hydroxyprostaglandin dehydrogenase (NAD^{+}), (EC 1.1.1.141), is an enzyme produced by the HPGD gene.

== Function ==
It catalyzes the NAD⁺-dependent oxidation of the 15-hydroxyl group of prostaglandins (primarily prostaglandin E_{2} or PGE_{2}, but also others like PGD_{2} and PGF_{2α}) and related eicosanoids (such as lipoxins), converting them to inactive 15-keto metabolites. This is the rate-limiting step in prostaglandin degradation, reducing their biological activity and regulating processes such as inflammation, cell proliferation, and tissue homeostasis.:

prostaglandin E2
+ NAD^{+}
H^{+}
H^{+}
15-ketoprostaglandin E2
+ NADH

=== Biological Role ===
- Downregulation in cancer — Can be reduced in tumors (e.g., colorectal, lung, breast), leading to elevated PGE_{2} levels that promote tumorigenesis; it acts as a tumor suppressor.
- Aging and regeneration — Levels increase with age, contributing to tissue decline (e.g., muscle atrophy, cartilage loss). Inhibiting 15-PGDH elevates PGE_{2} and promotes regeneration in muscle, bone, cartilage, liver, colon, and hematopoietic tissues.
- Inflammation and immunity — Degrades pro-inflammatory prostaglandins; inhibition can enhance resolution of inflammation or protect barriers like the blood-brain barrier in conditions such as Alzheimer's or traumatic brain injury.
- Other roles — It is involved in wound healing, obesity-related inflammation, and pregnancy maintenance.

== Therapeutic interest ==
Small-molecule inhibitors of 15-PGDH are under investigation for promoting tissue repair, countering sarcopenia, treating osteoarthritis, and supporting recovery after injury or transplantation. Mutations in HPGD can cause rare disorders like primary hypertrophic osteoarthropathy (digital clubbing, bone overgrowth).

== Ligands ==
Inhibitors

- SW033291
- SW209415
- SW222746
- ML148
- 15-PGDH-IN-4
- HW201877

== Substrates ==
The two substrates of this enzyme are prostaglandin E2 and oxidised nicotinamide adenine dinucleotide (NAD^{+}). Its products are 15-ketoprostaglandin E2, reduced NADH, and a proton.

== Class ==
This enzyme belongs to the family of oxidoreductases, specifically those acting on the CH-OH group of donor with NAD^{+} or NADP^{+} as acceptor.

The systematic name of this enzyme class is (5Z,13E)-(15S)-11alpha,15-dihydroxy-9-oxoprost-13-enoate:NAD^{+} 15-oxidoreductase. Other names in common use include NAD^{+}-dependent 15-hydroxyprostaglandin dehydrogenase (type I), PGDH, 11alpha,15-dihydroxy-9-oxoprost-13-enoate:NAD^{+} 15-oxidoreductase, 15-OH-PGDH, 15-hydroxyprostaglandin dehydrogenase, 15-hydroxyprostanoic dehydrogenase, NAD^{+}-specific 15-hydroxyprostaglandin dehydrogenase, prostaglandin dehydrogenase, 15-hydroxyprostaglandin dehydrogenase (NAD^{+}), and 15-PGDH.

== Structural studies ==
As of late 2007, only one structure has been solved for this class of enzymes, with the PDB accession code PDB: 2GDZ.
