= 15-hydroxyprostaglandin-I dehydrogenase (NADP+) =

Class of enzymes

15-hydroxyprostaglandin-I dehydrogenase (NADP^{+})

Identifiers
- EC no.: 1.1.1.231
- CAS no.: 79468-49-8

Databases
- IntEnz: IntEnz view
- BRENDA: BRENDA entry
- ExPASy: NiceZyme view
- KEGG: KEGG entry
- MetaCyc: metabolic pathway
- PRIAM: profile
- PDB structures: RCSB PDB PDBe PDBsum
- Gene Ontology: AmiGO / QuickGO
Search
- PMC: articles
- PubMed: articles
- NCBI: proteins

In enzymology, a 15-hydroxyprostaglandin-I dehydrogenase (NADP^{+}) (EC 1.1.1.231) is an enzyme that catalyzes the chemical reaction

(5Z,13E)-(15S)-6,9alpha-epoxy-11alpha,15-dihydroxyprosta-5,13- dienoate + NADP^{+} $\rightleftharpoons$ (5Z,13E)-6,9alpha-epoxy-11alpha-hydroxy-15-oxoprosta-5,13-dienoate + NADPH + H^{+}

The 3 substrates of this enzyme are (5Z,13E)-(15S)-6,9alpha-epoxy-11alpha,15-dihydroxyprosta-5,13-, dienoate, and NADP^{+}, whereas its 3 products are (5Z,13E)-6,9alpha-epoxy-11alpha-hydroxy-15-oxoprosta-5,13-dienoate, NADPH, and H^{+}.

This enzyme belongs to the family of oxidoreductases, specifically those acting on the CH-OH group of donor with NAD^{+} or NADP^{+} as acceptor. The systematic name of this enzyme class is (5Z,13E)-(15S)-6,9alpha-epoxy-11alpha,15-dihydroxyprosta-5,13-dienoa te:NADP^{+} 15-oxidoreductase. Other names in common use include prostacyclin dehydrogenase, PG I2 dehydrogenase, prostacyclin dehydrogenase, NADP^{+}-linked 15-hydroxyprostaglandin (prostacyclin) dehydrogenase, NADP^{+}-dependent PGI2-specific 15-hydroxyprostaglandin dehydrogenase, and 15-hydroxyprostaglandin-I dehydrogenase (NADP^{+}).
