= ALOX12 =

Protein-coding gene in the species Homo sapiens

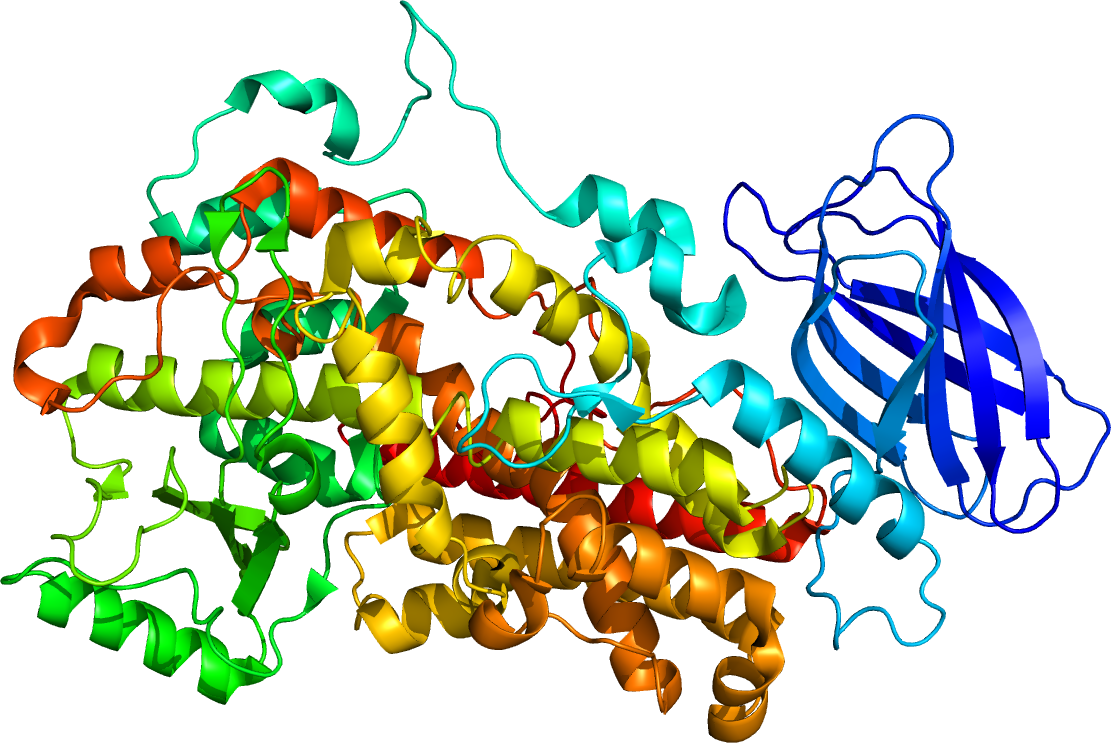

Identifiers
- Aliases: ALOX12, 12-LOX, 12S-LOX, LOG12, arachidonate 12-lipoxygenase, 12S type
- External IDs: OMIM: 152391; MGI: 87998; GeneCards: ALOX12
Available structures
PDB	Ortholog search: PDBe RCSB
PDB	List of PDB id codes 3D3L
Enzyme activity
EC #	BRENDA	ExPASy	KEGG	MetaCyc
1.13.11.31	↗	↗	↗	↗
1.13.11.33	↗	↗	↗	↗

Gene location (Human)
Chr.	Chromosome 17 (human)
Band	17p13.1	Start	6,996,049 bp
Band	17p13.1	End	7,010,754 bp

Gene location (Mouse)
Chr.	Chromosome 11 (mouse)
Band	11 B3|11 42.99 cM	Start	70,132,283 bp
Band	11 B3|11 42.99 cM	End	70,146,179 bp
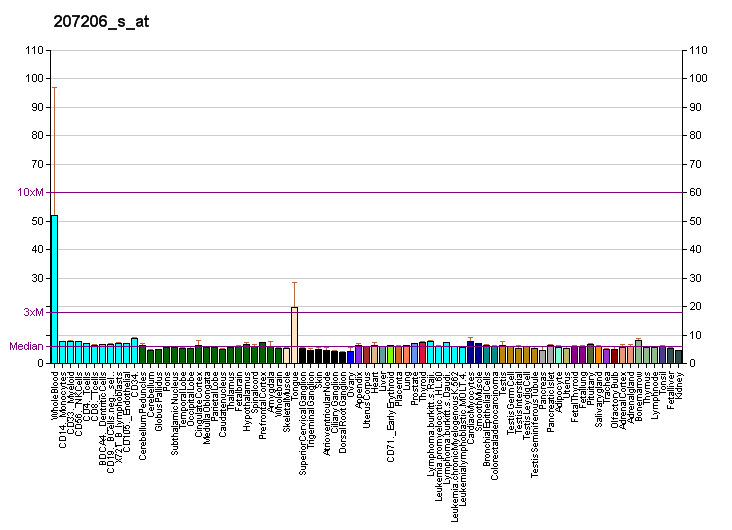
RNA expression pattern
Bgee	Human / Mouse (ortholog); Top expressed in: amniotic fluid; buccal mucosa cell; monocyte; epithelium of esophagus; gonad; gums; vagina; oral cavity; skin of abdomen; skin of leg / Top expressed in: blood; efferent ductule; conjunctival fornix; tibiofemoral joint; transitional epithelium of urinary bladder; submandibular gland; ankle joint; lip; seminal vesicula; spleen; More reference expression data
BioGPS	More reference expression data
Gene ontology
Molecular function	hepoxilin A3 synthase activity; iron ion binding; arachidonate 12(S)-lipoxygenase activity; dioxygenase activity; hepoxilin-epoxide hydrolase activity; metal ion binding; protein binding; linoleate 13S-lipoxygenase activity; oxidoreductase activity; oxidoreductase activity, acting on single donors with incorporation of molecular oxygen, incorporation of two atoms of oxygen; hydrolase activity
Cellular component	cytoplasm; cytosol; membrane; sarcolemma; extracellular exosome
Biological process	linoleic acid metabolic process; positive regulation of cell death; positive regulation of endothelial cell differentiation; establishment of skin barrier; lipoxin A4 biosynthetic process; lipid metabolism; positive regulation of cell migration; lipoxin B4 biosynthetic process; ageing; negative regulation of apoptotic process; negative regulation of platelet aggregation; negative regulation of muscle cell apoptotic process; fatty acid metabolic process; positive regulation of angiogenesis; reactive oxygen species metabolic process; superoxide anion generation; positive regulation of endothelial cell migration; lipoxygenase pathway; hepoxilin biosynthetic process; positive regulation of cysteine-type endopeptidase activity involved in apoptotic process; positive regulation of cell growth; positive regulation of gene expression; leukotriene A4 metabolic process; positive regulation of mitochondrial depolarization; fatty acid oxidation; positive regulation of cell population proliferation; positive regulation of apoptotic process; cellular response to lipid; hepoxilin metabolic process; lipoxin metabolic process; positive regulation of cell adhesion; positive regulation of smooth muscle cell proliferation; arachidonic acid metabolic process; long-chain fatty acid biosynthetic process; positive regulation of blood vessel endothelial cell migration; positive regulation of endothelial tube morphogenesis; lipoxin biosynthetic process
Sources:Amigo / QuickGO
Orthologs
Databases	NCBI: entry; OMA: entry
Species	Human	Mouse
Entrez	239	11684
Ensembl	ENSG00000108839	ENSMUSG00000000320
UniProt	P18054	P39655
RefSeq (mRNA)	NM_000697	NM_007440; NM_001331118
RefSeq (protein)	NP_000688	NP_001318047; NP_031466
Location (UCSC)	Chr 17: 7 – 7.01 Mb	Chr 11: 70.13 – 70.15 Mb
PubMed search
- Wikidata
View/Edit Human	View/Edit Mouse

ALOX12 (EC 1.13.11.31), also known as arachidonate 12-lipoxygenase, 12-lipoxygenase, 12S-Lipoxygenase, 12-LOX, and 12S-LOX is a lipoxygenase-type enzyme that in humans is encoded by the ALOX12 gene which is located along with other lipoyxgenases on chromosome 17p13.3. ALOX12 is 75 kilodalton protein composed of 663 amino acids.

== Nomenclature ==
arachidonate 12-lipoxygenase

Identifiers
- EC no.: 1.13.11.31
- CAS no.: 82391-43-3

Databases
- BRENDA: enzyme data
- ExPASy: NiceZyme view
- KEGG: enzyme entry
- MetaCyc: metabolic pathway
- Rhea: reactions
- PDB structures: RCSB PDB PDBe PDBsum
- Gene Ontology: AmiGO / QuickGO
Search
- PMC: articles
- PubMed: articles
- NCBI: proteins

Other systematic names for ALOX12 include 12S-Lipoxygenase, platelet-type 12-lipoxygenase, arachidonate:oxygen 12-oxidoreductase, Delta12-lipoxygenase, 12Delta-lipoxygenase, and C-12 lipoxygenase. ALOX12, often termed plate platelet-type 12-lipoxygenase, is distinguished from leukocyte-type 12-lipoxygenase which is found in mice, rats, cows, and pigs but not humans. Leukocyte-type 12-lipoxygenase in these animal species shares 73-86% amino acid identity with human ALOX15 but only 57-66% identity with human platelet-type 12-lipoxygenase and, like ALOX15, metabolizes arachidonic acid primarily to 15(S)-hydroperoxy-5Z,8Z,11Z,13E-eicosatetraenoic acid (i.e. 15(S)-HpETE; see 15-Hydroxyeicosatetraenoic acid). Accordingly, rodent leukocyte 12-lipoxygenase is deemed an ortholog of ALOX15 and is designated as Alox15.

Human ALOX12 and ALOX15 along with rodent leukocyte-type Alox12 and Alox15 are commonly termed 12/15-lipoxygenases based on their ability to metabolize arachidonic acid to both 12(S)-HpETE and 15(S)-HpETE and to conduct this same metabolism on arachidonic acid that is esterified to membrane phospholipids; human ALOX15B makes 15(S)-HpETE but not 12(S)-HpETE and therefore is not regarded as a 12/15-lipoxygenase. Studies on the role of ALOX12 in pathophysiology using the main models for such functional studies, rats and mice, are complicated because neither species possesses a lipoxygenase that makes a predominance of 12(S)-HETE and therefore is metabolically equivalent to ALOX12. For example, the functions inferred for Alox12 in mice made deficient in Alox12 using knockout methods may not indicate a similar function for ALOX12 in humans due to differences in these two enzymes' metabolic activities. The function of ALOX12 is further clouded by human ALOX15 which metabolizes arachidonic acid primarily to 15(S)-HpETE but also makes lesser but still significant amounts of 12(S)-HpETE (see ALOX15).

ALOX12 is also distinguished from arachidonate 12-lipoxygenase, 12R type (ALOX12B), which metabolizes arachidonic acid to the R stereoisomer of 12(S)-HpETE viz., 12(R)-hydroperoxy-5Z,8Z,10E,14Z-icosatetraenoic acid (12(R)-HpETE), a product with very different pathophysiological roles than that of 12(S)-HpETE (see ALOX12B).

== Discovery ==
ALOX12, originally called arachidonate 12-lipoxygenase, was first characterized by the Nobel Laureate, Bengt I. Samuelsson, and his famed colleague, Mats Hamberg, in 1974 by showing that human platelets metabolize arachidonic acid not only by the well-known cyclooxygenase pathway into prostaglandins and 12-hydroxyheptadecatrienoic acid but also by a cyclooxygenase-independent pathway to 12(S)-hydroperoxy-5,8,10,14-eicosatetraenoic acid; this activity was the first mammalian lipoxygenase activity to be characterized. In 1975, the first biological activity was attached to this metabolite in studies showing that it simulated the chemotaxis of human neutrophils. During the several years thereafter, human ALOX12 was purified, characterized biochemically, and had its gene molecularly cloned.

== Tissue distribution ==
Based predominantly on the presence of its mRNA, human ALOX12 is distributed predominantly in blood platelets and leukocytes and at lower levels in the basal layer of the epidermis (particularly in the skin lesions of psoriasis), islets of Langerhans within the pancreas, and certain cancers.

== Enzyme activities ==
Arachidonic acid

The control of ALOX12 activity appears to rest principally on the availability of its polyunsaturated fatty acid (PUFA) substrates which are released from storage in membrane phospholipids by cell stimulation. The enzyme participates in arachidonic acid metabolism by conducting the following chemical reaction wherein its substrates are arachidonic acid (also termed as arachidonate or, chemically, as 5Z,8Z,11Z,14Z-eicosatetraenoic acid) and O_{2} (i.e. oxygen) and its product is 12S-hydroperoxy-5Z,8Z,10E,14Z-eicosatetraenoic acid (i.e. 12S-hydroperoxyeicosatetraenoic acid or 12S-HpETE):

- arachidonate + O_{2} → 12S-hydroperoxy-5Z,8Z,10E,14Z-eicosatetraenoic acid

In cells, 12SHpETE may be further metabolized by ALOX12 itself, by ALOXE3 or possibly other, as yet not fully identified, hepoxilin syntheses to hepoxilin A3 (8R/S-hydroxy-11,12-oxido-5Z,9E,14Z-eicosatrienoic acid) and B3 (10R/S-hydroxy-11,12-oxido-5Z,8Z,14Z-eicosatrienoic acid):

- 12S-hydroperoxy-5Z,8Z,10E,14Z-eicosatetraenoic acid → 8R/S-hydroxy-11,12-oxido-5Z,9E,14Z-eicosatrienoic acid + 10R/S-hydroxy-11,12-oxido-5Z,8Z,14Z-eicosatrienoic acid

Hepoxilins can promote certain inflammation responses, increase pain perception (i.e. tactile allodynia), regulate regional blood flow, and contribute to the regulation of blood pressure in animal models (see Hepoxilins). Far more commonly, however, 12S-HpETE is rapidly reduced to its hydroxyl product by ubiquitous cellular peroxidase activities thereby forming 12S-hydroxy-5Z,8Z,10E,14Z-eicosatetraenoic acid, i.e. 12-hydroxyeicosatetraenoic acid or 12S-HETE:

- 12S-hydroperoxy-5(Z),8(Z),10(E),14(Z)-eicosatetraenoic acid → 12S-hydroxy-5(Z),8(Z),10(E),14(Z)-eicosatetraenoic acid

12S-HETE promotes inflammation responses, may be involved in the perception of puritis (i.e. itching) in the skin, and regulates regional blood flow in animal models; it also promotes the malignant behavior of cultured human cancer cells as well as the growth of certain cancers in animal models (see 12-HETE). While arachidonate and 12(S)-HETE are the predominant substrates and products, respectively, of ALOX12, the enzyme also metabolizes other PUFA.

It metabolizes the omega-3 fatty acid, docosahexaenoic acid (DHA i.e., 4(Z),7(Z),10(Z),13(Z),16(Z),19(Z)-docosahexaenoic acid to 14(R)-hydroperoxy-4(Z),8(Z),10(Z),12(E),16(Z),19(Z)-docosahexaenoic acid)(i.e. 17-hydroperoxy-DHA)

Then, ALOX12 or an unidentified epoxidase-type enzyme may metabolize this intermediate to an epoxide, 13,14-epoxy-4(Z),7(Z),9(E),11(E),16(Z),19(Z)-docosahexaenoic acid (i.e. 13,14-e-maresin)

This is further metabolized to 7R,14S-dihydroxy-4Z,8E,10E,12Z,16Z,19Z-docosahexaenoic acid (i.e. Maresin 1), by an unidentified epoxide hydrolase-type enzyme:

- DHA → 17-hydroperoxy-DHA → 13,14-e-maresin → Maresin-1

Maresin 1 has a set of activities that may oppose those of 12(S)-HETE and the hepoxilins; it is a member of a class of PUFA metabolites termed Specialized pro-resolution mediators (SPMs) which possess anti-inflammatory, pain-alleviating, and other defensive activities. ALOX12 also acts on leukotriene A4 (LTA4) in a two cellular reaction termed transcellular metabolism: human neutrophils metabolize arachidonic acid to its 5,6-epoxide, LTA4, and releases this intermediate to nearby neutrophils which metabolize it to lipoxin A4 (5S,6R,15S-trihydroxy-7E,9E,11Z,13Z-eicosatetraenoic acid) and lipoxin B4 (5S,14R,15S-trihydroxy-6E,8Z,10E,12E-eicosatetraenoic acid); both lipoxins are SPMs with many SPM-like activities (see lipoxin). ALOX12 may also metabolize lesser amounts of DHA to secondary products including 17-hydroperoxy-DHA, 11-hydroperoxy-DHA, and 8,14-dihydroxy-DHA ALOX12 may likewise metabolize 5(S)-HETE to 5S,12S-dihydroxyeicosatetraenoic acid (12,15-diHETE) and 15S-HETE to 14,15S-diETE. While these compounds have not been thoroughly evaluated for bioactivity, 17-hydroperoxy-HDHA and the reduced product to which it is rapidly converted in cells, 17-hydroxy-HDHA, have been shown to inhibit the growth of cultured human prostate cancer cell by causing them to enter apoptosis.

== Animal studies ==
Studies on rodents lacking or made deficient in the leukocyte-type 12-lipoxygenase, Alox12 (which is most closely related to human ALOX15) implicate this enzyme in: a) preventing the development and complications of dietary-induced and/or genetically induced diabetes, adipose cell/tissue dysfunction, and obesity; b) the development of atherosclerosis and Steatohepatitis; b) regulating blood vessel contraction, dilation, pressure, remodeling, and angiogenesis; c) maintaining normal renal, neurological, and brain function; and d) the development of Alzheimer's disease. In these studies, it is usually unclear which, if any metabolite(s) of Alox12 was implicated.

== Preclinical studies ==
=== Metabolic syndrome ===
The metabolic syndrome is a clustering of at least three of five of the following medical conditions: abdominal (central) obesity, elevated blood pressure, elevated fasting plasma glucose (or overt diabetes), high serum triglycerides, and low high-density lipoprotein (HDL) levels. ALOX12 and its metabolite, 12(S)-HETE, are elevated in the islets of Langerhans of patients with type 1 diabetes or type 2 diabetes as well as in the fat cells of white adipose tissue of morbidly obese type 2 diabetic patients. The PP cells (i.e. gamma cells) of the pancreas islets appear to be the major if not only site where ALOX12 is expressed in these patients. The studies propose that in the islets of Langerhans ALOX12 and its 12(S)-HETE product cause excessive production of reactive oxygen species and inflammation which lead to losses in insulin-secreting beta cells and thereby types 1 and 2 diabetes and that in adipose tissue the excess in AlOX12, 12(S)-HETE, reactive oxygen species, and inflammation lead to fat cell dysfunction (also see 12-HETE#Inflammation and inflammatory diseases and 12-HETE#Diabetes). Indeed, in one study a Single-nucleotide polymorphism, rs2073438, located in an intron region of the ALOX12 gene was significantly associated with total and percentage fat mass of obese compared to non-obese young Chinese men. ALOX12 and 12(S)-HETE are likewise implicated in essential hypertension (see next section). Hence, ALOX12 and its metabolite(s) may contribute to the development and/or progression of obesity, diabetes, hypertension, and/or the metabolic syndrome.

=== Blood vessels ===
A selective but not totally specific inhibitor of ALOX12 reduced the growth response of cultured human endothelial cells to basic fibroblast growth factor and vascular endothelial growth factor (VEGF); this reduction was partially reversed by 12(S)-HETE; 12(S)-HETE also stimulates human prostate cell lines to produce VEGF. These results suggest that growth responses to the two growth factors involves their stimulation of 12(S)-HETE production by endothelial cells and therefore that ALOX12 may be a target for reducing the neo-vascularization that promotes arthritic and cancer diseases. 12(S)-HETE also dilates human coronary microcirculation arteries by activating these vessels' smooth muscle BKca Potassium channels and is therefore suggested to be an Endothelium-derived hyperpolarizing factor. Finally, a single nucleotide variant in the ALOX12 gene (R261Q [3957 G>A]) has been associated with essential hypertension and elevation in the urinary excretion of 12(S)-HETE in humans and may be a contributing factor for to essential hypertension (see also 12-HETE#Blood pressure).

=== Alzheimer's disease ===
Patients with Alzheimer's disease or other forms of dementia have significantly higher levels of 12(S)-HETE (and 15(S)-HETE) in cerebrospinal fluid compared to aged-matched normal individuals. Complementary studies in rodent models bearing human mutated genes for Amyloid precursor protein and/or tau protein (see tau protein#Clinical significance) that produce Alzheimer's dementia-like syndromes implicate 12(S)-HETE, 15(S)-HETE, and a 12/15-lipoxygenase type enzyme in the development and progression of the Alzhiemer's disease-like symptoms and findings in these animals. In a single study, ALOX12 mRNA was found elevated in the brain tissue of Alzheimer's disease patients compared to control patients. These results suggest that ALOX12 (or ALOX15) may contribute to the development of Alzheimer's disease in humans.

=== Cancer ===
Studies in prostate cancer find that human prostate cancer cell lines in culture overexpress ALOX12, overproduce 12(S)-HETE, and respond to 12(S)-HETE by increasing their rate of proliferation, increasing their cell surface expression of integrins, increasing their survival and delaying their apoptosis, and increasing their production of vascular endothelial growth factor and MMP9 (i.e. Matrix metallopeptidase 9); selective (but not entirely) specific ALOX12 inhibitors reduced the proliferation and survival of these cells (see also 12-HETE#prostate cancer). These finding suggest that ALOX12 and its 12(S)-HETE product may contribute to the growth and spread of prostate cancer in humans. Recently, hypermethylation of the ALOX12 gene in prostate cancer tissue was associated with clinical predictors for a high rate of recurrent disease. Some studies have found that 12(S)-HETE also promotes the growth and/or related pro-malignant behaviors of various other types of cultured cancer cell lines (see 12-HETE#Other cancers). ALOX12 has been shown to interact with keratin 5 and LMNA as screened in a yeast two-hybrid interaction library from human epidermoid carcinoma A431 cells; these proteins are candidates for regulating 12-LOX, particularly in tumor cells.

=== Platelet function ===
Although first identified in human platelets, the role of ALOX12 and its major metabolites, 12(S)-HpETE and 12(S)-HETE in platelet function remains controversial and unclear; it is possible that the ALOX12-12(S)-HETE metabolic pathway has dual functions in promoting or inhibiting platelet responses depending on the stimulating agent and response studied but that inhibiting ALOX12 may ultimately prove useful in inhibiting platelet-related blood clotting.

=== Other associations ===
The ALOX12 gene has susceptibility alleles (rs6502997, rs312462, rs6502998, and rs434473) for the parasitic disease, human congenital toxoplasmosis. Fetus bearer of these alleles thus suffer an increased susceptibility to this disease.

== Inhibitors ==
Onvoloxastat (CAD-1005; VLX-1005; ML355) is a 12-LOX inhibitor which is under development for the treatment of heparin-induced thrombocytopenia and thrombosis syndrome (HITTS) and other indications.
