= 15-hydroxyprostaglandin-D dehydrogenase (NADP+) =

Class of enzymes

15-hydroxyprostaglandin-D dehydrogenase (NADP^{+})

Identifiers
- EC no.: 1.1.1.196
- CAS no.: 84399-95-1

Databases
- IntEnz: IntEnz view
- BRENDA: BRENDA entry
- ExPASy: NiceZyme view
- KEGG: KEGG entry
- MetaCyc: metabolic pathway
- PRIAM: profile
- PDB structures: RCSB PDB PDBe PDBsum
- Gene Ontology: AmiGO / QuickGO
Search
- PMC: articles
- PubMed: articles
- NCBI: proteins

In enzymology, 15-hydroxyprostaglandin-D dehydrogenase (NADP^{+}) (EC 1.1.1.196) is an enzyme that catalyzes the chemical reaction

prostaglandin D2
+ NADP^{+}
H^{+}
H^{+}
15-dehydro-prostaglandin D2
+ NADPH

Thus, the two substrates of this enzyme are prostaglandin D_{2} and oxidised nicotinamide adenine dinucleotide phosphate (NADP^{+}). Its products are 15-dehydro-prostaglandin D_{2}, reduced NADPH, and a proton.

This enzyme belongs to the family of oxidoreductases, specifically those acting on the CH-OH group of donor with NAD^{+} or NADP^{+} as acceptor. The systematic name of this enzyme class is (5Z,13E)-(15S)-9alpha,15-dihydroxy-11-oxoprosta-5,13-dienoate:NADP^{+} 15-oxidoreductase. Other names in common use include prostaglandin-D 15-dehydrogenase (NADP^{+}), dehydrogenase, prostaglandin D2, NADP^{+}-PGD2 dehydrogenase, dehydrogenase, 15-hydroxyprostaglandin (nicotinamide adenine, dinucleotide phosphate), 15-hydroxy PGD2 dehydrogenase, 15-hydroxyprostaglandin dehydrogenase (NADP^{+}), NADP^{+}-dependent 15-hydroxyprostaglandin dehydrogenase, prostaglandin D2 dehydrogenase, NADP^{+}-linked 15-hydroxyprostaglandin dehydrogenase, NADP^{+}-specific 15-hydroxyprostaglandin dehydrogenase, NADP^{+}-linked prostaglandin D2 dehydrogenase, and 15-hydroxyprostaglandin-D dehydrogenase (NADP^{+}). This enzyme participates in arachidonic acid metabolism.
