= C23H37NO5S =

The molecular formula C_{23}H_{37}NO_{5}S (molar mass: 439.61 g/mol) may refer to:

- Eoxin E4, or 14,15-leukotriene E4
- Leukotriene E4, or LTE_{4}
