= List of capsaicinoids =

This is a list of capsaicinoids, a class of compound found in members of the capsicum family. They are the chemical responsible for making chili peppers hot. The heat intensity of capsaicinoids is measured in Scoville heat units (SHU) by the Scoville heat scale.

== List of capsaicinoids ==
Structural formula	Name	Scoville heat units	Abbreviation	Reference
	Resiniferatoxin	16,000,000,000	RTX	
	Tinyatoxin	5,300,000,000	TTX or TTN	
	Phenylacetylrinvanil	4,800,000,000	IDN-5890	
	Capsaicin	16,000,000	CPS	
	Dihydrocapsaicin	16,000,000	DHC	
	Nonivamide	9,200,000	PAVA	
	Nordihydrocapsaicin	9,000,000	NDHC	
	Homocapsaicin	8,600,000	HC	
	Homodihydrocapsaicin	8,600,000	HDHC	
	Shogaol	150,000	6-SGL	
	Piperine	100,000	PIP	
	Gingerol	80,000	6-G	
	Capsiate	16,000	CAP	
	Norcapsaicin	~0 (Note: The SHU for Norcapsaicin and Nornorcapsaicin has not been measured. However, they are both present in bell peppers which have an SHU of 0 and so these compounds likely have an SHU of 0 or slightly above.)	(NA)	
	Nornorcapsaicin	~0	(NA)	
