= Vanilloid =

Chemical compounds containing a vanillyl group

The vanilloids are compounds which possess a vanillyl group. They include vanillyl alcohol, vanillin, vanillic acid, acetovanillone, vanillylmandelic acid, homovanillic acid, and capsaicin, among others. Vanilloid isomers are called isovanilloids.

Structure of vanillyl alcohol	Structure of Vanillin	Structure of vanillic acid	Structure of acetovanillon	Structure of vanillylamine	Structure of Capsaicin
Vanillyl Alcohol	Vanillin	Vanillic Acid	Acetovanillone	Vanillylamine	Capsaicin

A number of vanilloids, most notably capsaicin, bind to the transient receptor potential vanilloid type 1 (TRPV1) receptor, an ion channel which naturally responds to noxious stimuli such as high temperatures and acidic pH. This action is responsible for the burning sensation experienced after eating spicy peppers. Endogenously generated chemicals that trigger the TRPV1 channel of the vanilloid class are referred to as endovanilloids; these incide anandamide, 20-hydroxyeicosatetraenoic acid (20-HETE), N-arachidonoyl dopamine (NADA) and N-oleoyl-dopamine (CID 5282106 from PubChem).

Fatty acid amide hydrolase (FAAH), is a crucial enzyme for endovanilloid, and the N-acylethanolamines (NAEs), catabolism at TRPV1, and other cannabinoid receptors.

Anandamide

Outside the food industry, vanilloids such as nonivamide (PAVA) are used commercially in pepper spray formulations.

Other vanilloids which act at TRPV1 include resiniferatoxin and olvanil.
