= Vanillic =

Vanillic may refer to:

- Vanillic acid, an oxidized form of vanillin
- Vanillic alcohol, a synonym for vanillyl alcohol, a derivative of vanillin
- Vanillic aldehyde, a synonym for vanillin
