= C17H27NO3 =

The molecular formula C_{17}H_{27}NO_{3} (molar mass: 293.40 g/mol, exact mass: 293.1991 u) may refer to:

- Embutramide
- Nordihydrocapsaicin
- Nonivamide, or PAVA
- Pramocaine
