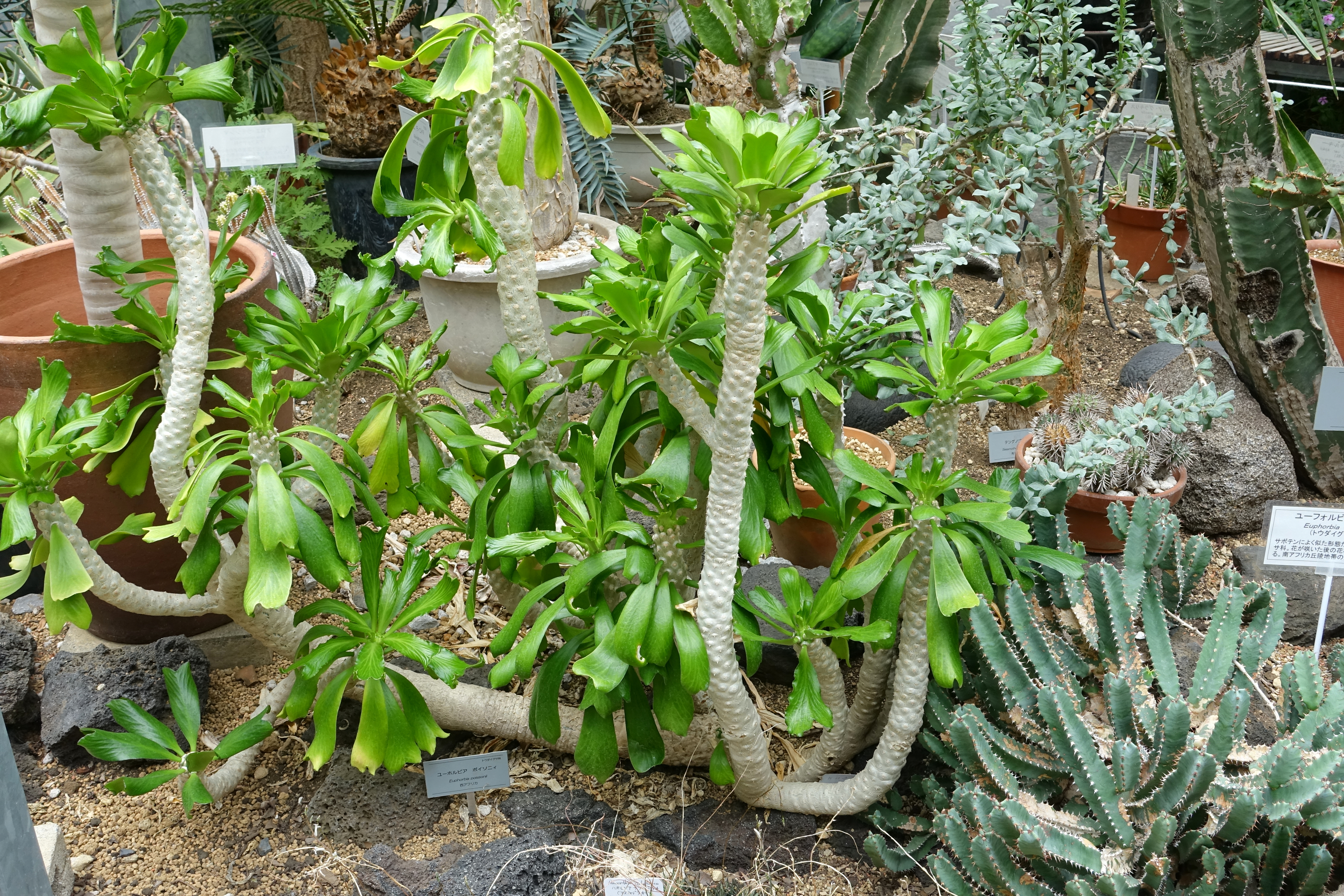

Scientific classification
- Kingdom: Plantae
- Clade: Embryophytes
- Clade: Tracheophytes
- Clade: Spermatophytes
- Clade: Angiosperms
- Clade: Eudicots
- Clade: Rosids
- Order: Malpighiales
- Family: Euphorbiaceae
- Genus: Euphorbia
- Species: E. poissonii

Binomial name
- Euphorbia poissonii Pax

= Euphorbia poissonii =

Species of plant

Euphorbia poissonii, also known as Euphorbia poissoni and, incorrectly, as Euphorbia poisoni, is a highly irritant and toxic succulent member of the large and varied spurge family of plants. It is native to northern Nigeria, where local farmers extract its latex for use as a pesticide. Its powerfully irritant and pain-producing nature mandates use as a fencing plant. It is known to the Berom people of the Jos area as pyùlúp who transplant it to their compounds where it is regarded as protection against witchcraft.

It is named for French botanist Henri Louis Poisson, who formally described other Euphorbia species.

== Toxic activity ==
In addition to a variety of irritant phorbol-type esters, the latex contains resiniferatoxin and tinyatoxin, two closely related highly irritant resiniferonol-type esters. The most active toxin, resiniferatoxin, binds to pain receptors in the same way as capsaicin but much more powerfully. It stimulates the neurons to fire repeatedly, causing pain.

Due to its selective nature of binding and killing pain receptors while leaving other nerve cells intact, resiniferatoxin is currently being researched as a possible treatment for chronic pain.
