= Vanillin dehydrogenase =

vanillin dehydrogenase

Identifiers
- EC no.: 1.2.1.67
- CAS no.: 189767-93-9

Databases
- BRENDA: enzyme data
- ExPASy: NiceZyme view
- KEGG: enzyme entry
- MetaCyc: metabolic pathway
- Rhea: reactions
- PDB structures: RCSB PDB PDBe PDBsum
- Gene Ontology: AmiGO / QuickGO
Search
- PMC: articles
- PubMed: articles
- NCBI: proteins

In enzymology, a vanillin dehydrogenase (EC 1.2.1.67) is an enzyme that catalyzes the chemical reaction

+ NAD^{+} + H_{2}O $\rightleftharpoons$ + NADH + H^{+}

The 3 substrates of this enzyme are vanillin, NAD^{+}, and H_{2}O, whereas its 3 products are vanillate, NADH, and H^{+}.

This enzyme belongs to the family of oxidoreductases, specifically those acting on the aldehyde or oxo group of donor with NAD+ or NADP+ as acceptor. The systematic name of this enzyme class is vanillin:NAD+ oxidoreductase. This enzyme participates in 2,4-dichlorobenzoate degradation.
