= PAVA spray =

Incapacitant spray similar to pepper spray

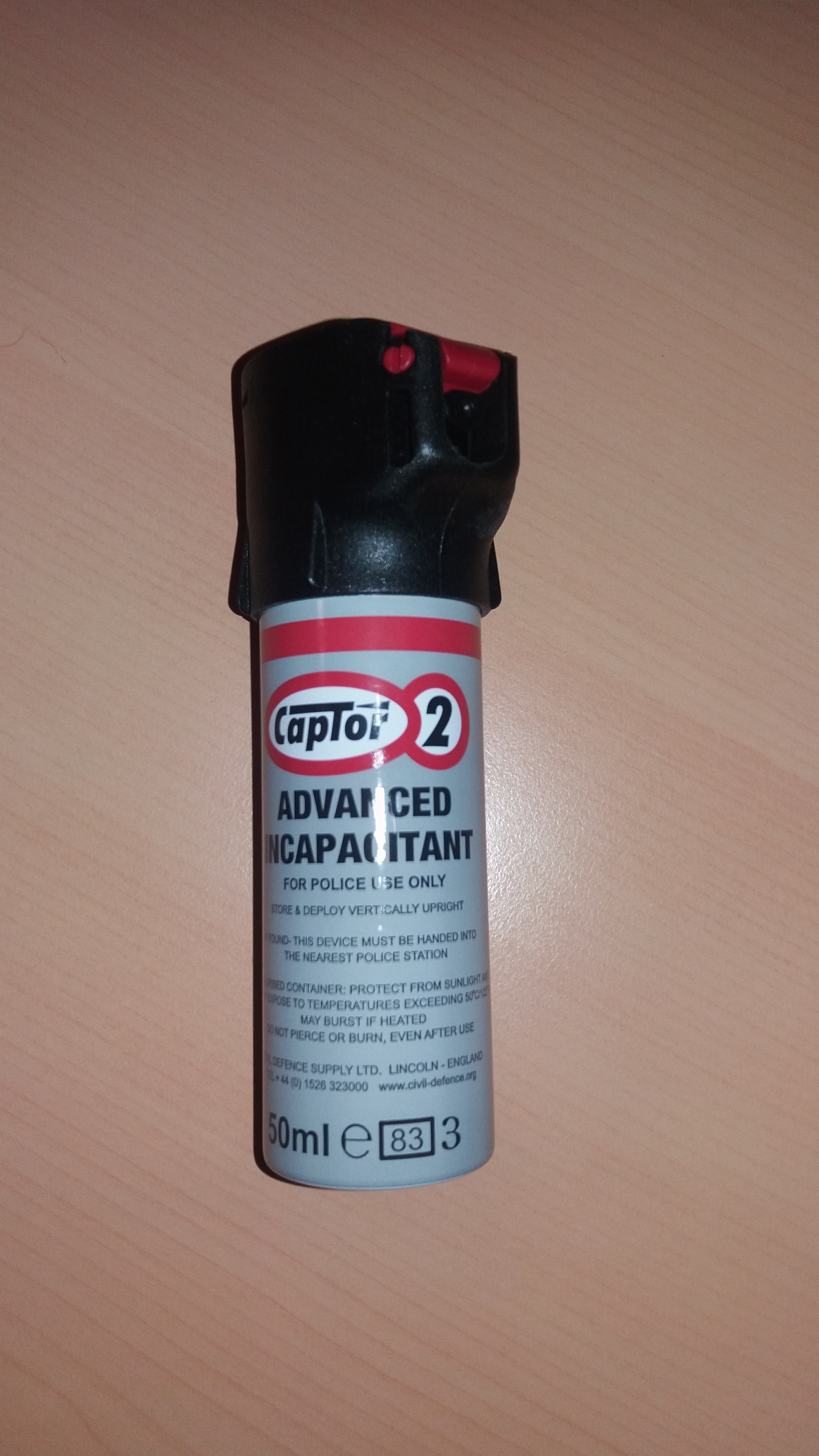
Captor 2, a brand of PAVA used by police officers in the United Kingdom

PAVA spray is an incapacitant spray similar to pepper spray. It is dispensed from a handheld canister, in a liquid stream. It contains a 0.3% solution of pelargonic acid vanillylamide (PAVA), also called nonivamide, a synthetic capsaicinoid (analogue of capsaicin), in a solvent of aqueous ethanol. The propellant is nitrogen. This solution has been selected because this is the minimum concentration which will fulfill the purpose of the equipment: namely, to minimise a person's capacity for resistance, without unnecessarily prolonging their discomfort.

PAVA is significantly more potent than CS gas. The liquid stream is a spray pattern and has a maximum effective range of up to four metres (13 ft). Maximum accuracy, however, will be achieved over a distance of 1.25–2 metres (4.1–6.6 ft). The operating distance is the distance between the canister and the subject's eyes, not the distance between the user and the subject.

== Effects ==
PAVA primarily affects the eyes, causing closure and severe pain. The pain to the eyes is reported to be greater than that caused by CS. The effectiveness rate is very high once PAVA gets into the eyes; however, there have been occasions where PAVA and CS have failed to work—especially when the subject is under the influence of alcohol or other drugs. Exposure to fresh moving air will normally result in a significant recovery from the effects of PAVA, within 15–35 minutes.

Pharmacologically, like other capsaicinoids, PAVA works by direct binding to receptors (TRPV1) that normally produce the pain and sensation of heat, as if exposed to scalding heat.

== Usage ==
PAVA is used widely as a less lethal, temporary defence tool around the world including in the United Kingdom, India, Switzerland, and others.

=== British police and HM Prison Service ===
PAVA is approved for British police and HM Prison Service use in the United Kingdom. British police forces traditionally used CS gas spray, but with the more widespread carriage of tasers, PAVA has now mostly replaced its predecessor due to its non-flammable nature.

=== Legal restrictions ===
- United States: California, Minnesota, Delaware, Washington D.C. and Wisconsin restrict use of less than lethal projectiles and devices using them.
- United Kingdom: Under Section 5 of the Firearms Act 1968, individuals may not possess or use PAVA or other incapacitant sprays; however, police, prison officers and some Crown servants in law enforcement are allowed to use PAVA to uphold the law.

== Treatment ==
There are various treatments to combat the effects of nonivamide. One popular method includes administering a one to one solution of magnesium hydroxide and water to the eyes. Doctors also recommend not using oils or creams on the skin, and to not wear contact lenses, if one is planning to minimise the effects of nonivamide.

== See also ==
- Nonivamide
