= Dihydrocapsaicin =

Names
- Preferred IUPAC name N-[(4-Hydroxy-3-methoxyphenyl)methyl]-8-methylnonanamide
- Other names Dihydrocapsaicin, 6,7-Dihydrocapsaicin, 8-Methyl-N-vanillylnonanamide, Vanillylamide of 8-methylnonanoic acid, DHC, CCRIS 1589

Identifiers
CAS Number	19408-84-5
3D model (JSmol)	Interactive image
Beilstein Reference	2815150
ChEBI	CHEBI:46932
ChEMBL	ChEMBL311158
ChemSpider	97096
ECHA InfoCard	100.115.366
EC Number	606-308-7
KEGG	C16952
PubChem CID	107982
RTECS number	RA5998000
UNII	W9BV32M08A
CompTox Dashboard (EPA)	DTXSID4041864
- InChI: InChI=1S/C18H29NO3/c1-14(2)8-6-4-5-7-9-18(21)19-13-15-10-11-16(20)17(12-15)22-3/h10-12,14,20H,4-9,13H2,1-3H3,(H,19,21) Key: XJQPQKLURWNAAH-UHFFFAOYSA-N; InChI=1/C18H29NO3/c1-14(2)8-6-4-5-7-9-18(21)19-13-15-10-11-16(20)17(12-15)22-3/h10-12,14,20H,4-9,13H2,1-3H3,(H,19,21) Key: XJQPQKLURWNAAH-UHFFFAOYAI
- SMILES: CC(C)CCCCCCC(=O)NCC1=CC(=C(C=C1)O)OC

Properties
Chemical formula	C_{18}H_{29}NO_{3}
Molar mass	307.43 g/mol
Appearance	White to off-white solid
Solubility in water	Sparingly soluble

Hazards
- GHS labelling
Pictograms	(GHS06: Toxic)
Signal word	Danger
Hazard statements	H301, H315, H319, H335
Precautionary statements	P261, P264, P270, P271, P280, P301+P310, P302+P352, P304+P340, P305+P351+P338, P312, P321, P330, P332+P313, P337+P313, P362, P403+P233, P405, P501
NFPA 704 (fire diamond)	2 1 0
- Except where otherwise noted, data are given for materials in their standard state (at 25 °C [77 °F], 100 kPa). verify (what is ?) Infobox references

Dihydrocapsaicin
- Heat: Above peak (pure Dihydrocapsaicin is toxic)
- Scoville scale: 16,000,000 SHU

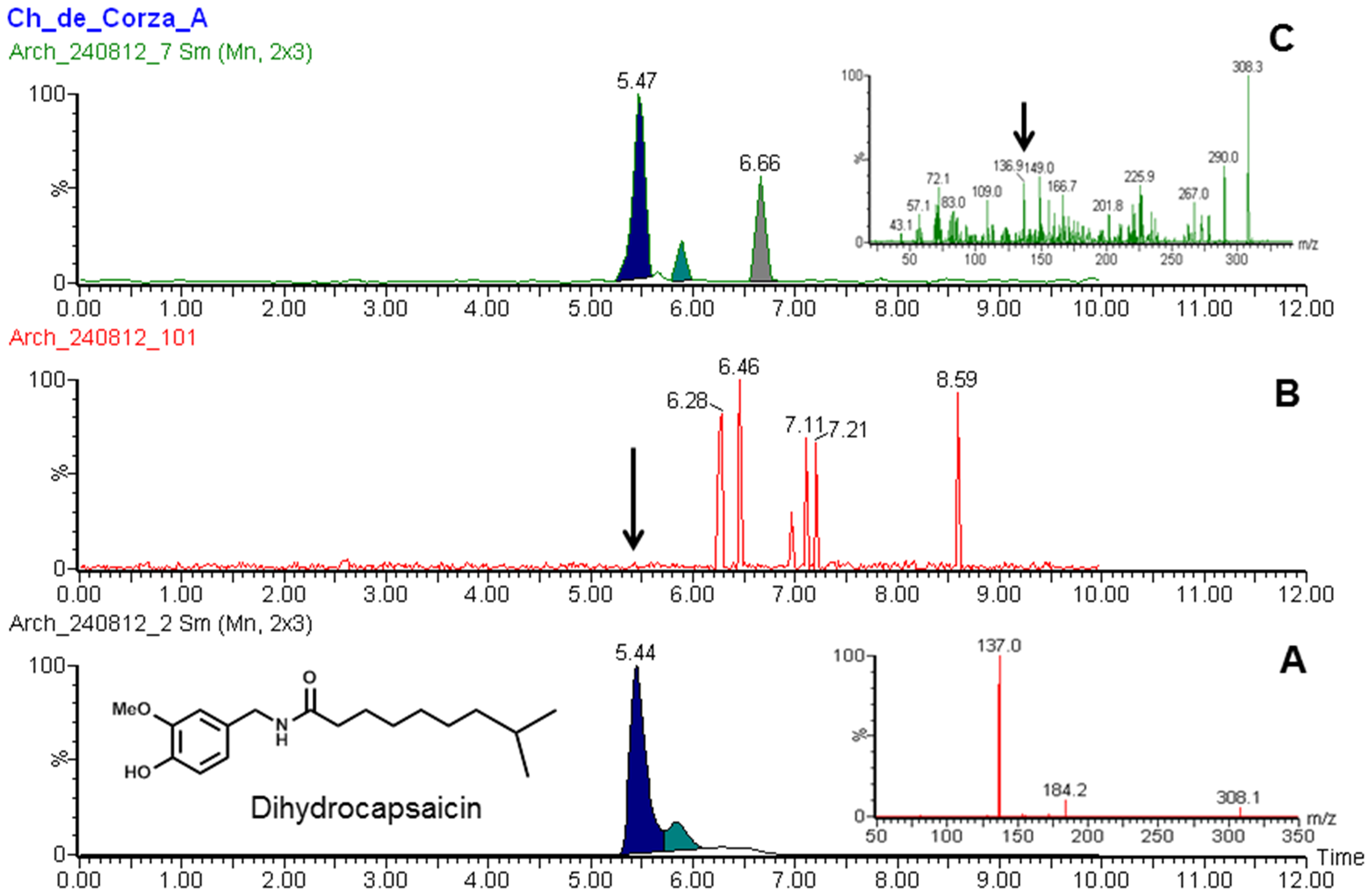
MS/MS spectra of standard dihydrocapsaicin (A) and from sample extract (B). Sample B confirms the compound was found in prehispanic pottery from Mexico. See here for details doi:10.1371/journal.pone.0079013.g005

Dihydrocapsaicin is a capsaicinoid and analog and congener of capsaicin in chili peppers (Capsicum). Like capsaicin, it is an irritant. It accounts for about 22% of the total capsaicinoid mixture and has the same pungency as capsaicin. Pure dihydrocapsaicin is a lipophilic colorless odorless crystalline to waxy compound. It is soluble in dimethyl sulfoxide and 100% ethanol.

== See also ==
- Capsaicin
- Nordihydrocapsaicin
- Homocapsaicin
- Homodihydrocapsaicin
- Nonivamide
- Scoville scale
- Pepper spray
- Hot sauce
