= DRC-5593 =

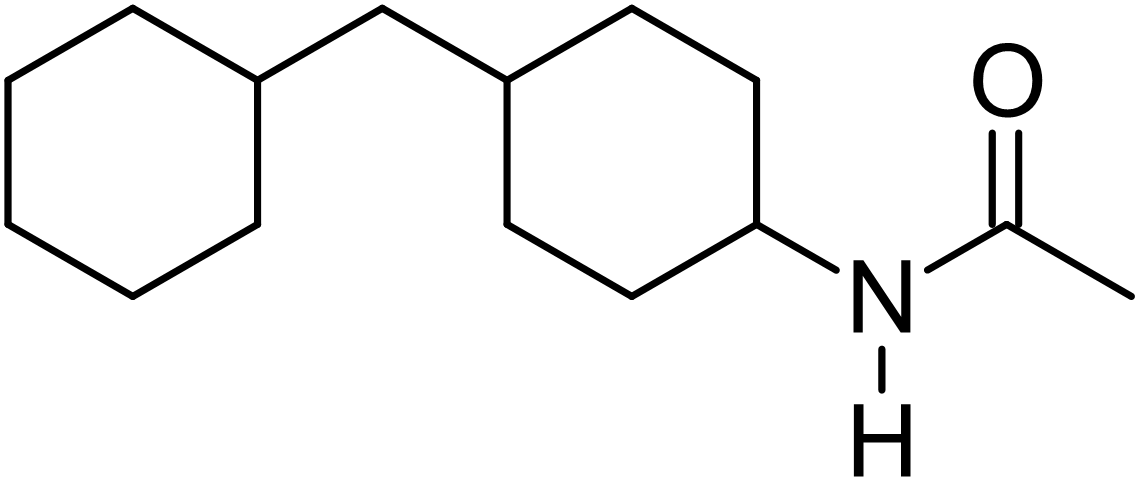

Names
- Other names NSC-172840

Identifiers
CAS Number	37794-48-2
3D model (JSmol)	Interactive image
ChemSpider	89307
PubChem CID	98877
UNII	QS580XO5XI
CompTox Dashboard (EPA)	DTXSID50201969
- InChI: InChI=1S/C15H27NO/c1-12(17)16-15-9-7-14(8-10-15)11-13-5-3-2-4-6-13/h13-15H,2-11H2,1H3,(H,16,17) Key: QWTOQWAJZHMPJW-UHFFFAOYSA-N
- SMILES: CC(=O)NC1CCC(CC1)CC2CCCCC2

Properties
Chemical formula	C_{15}H_{27}NO
Molar mass	237.387 g·mol^{−1}
- Except where otherwise noted, data are given for materials in their standard state (at 25 °C [77 °F], 100 kPa). Infobox references

DRC-5593 (N-Acetyl-4-cyclohexylmethylcyclohexylamine) is a powerful lachrymatory agent that was suggested as an animal repellant and riot control agent.

== See also ==
- Capsaicin
