= TXT =

TXT or txt may refer to:

== Technology ==
- SMS language or txt, an Internet slang language commonly used on short message service phones
- .txt, a filename extension for text files
- Text messaging on a phone using letters and symbols
- Trusted Execution Technology, Intel's implementation of Trusted Computing
- TXT records, a type of Domain Name System record; see List of DNS record types

== Arts and media ==
- Tomorrow X Together, a South Korean boy band
- TxT (film), a 2006 Filipino horror film

== Other uses ==
- txt, the ISO639-3 language code for Citak language, a Papuan language spoken in Citak-Mitak kecamatan (subdistrict), Mappi Regency, Indonesia
- TXT e-solutions an international software development and consulting company
- Docetaxel, an anti-cancer drug
- Textron, a manufacturing corporation

== See also ==
- TTX (disambiguation)
