= Homodihydrocapsaicin =

Names
- Preferred IUPAC name N-[(4-Hydroxy-3-methoxyphenyl)methyl]-9-methyldecanamide
- Other names: Homodihydrocapsaicin; N-Vanillyl-9-methyldecanamide; Vanillylamide of 9-methyldecanoic acid; HDHC

Identifiers
CAS Number	20279-06-5
3D model (JSmol)	Interactive image
ChemSpider	2341417
PubChem CID	3084336
UNII	QE35S0T20Z
CompTox Dashboard (EPA)	DTXSID30174127
- InChI: InChI=1S/C19H31NO3/c1-15(2)9-7-5-4-6-8-10-19(22)20-14-16-11-12-17(21)18(13-16)23-3/h11-13,15,21H,4-10,14H2,1-3H3,(H,20,22) Key: AKDLSISGGARWFP-UHFFFAOYSA-N; InChI=1/C19H31NO3/c1-15(2)9-7-5-4-6-8-10-19(22)20-14-16-11-12-17(21)18(13-16)23-3/h11-13,15,21H,4-10,14H2,1-3H3,(H,20,22) Key: AKDLSISGGARWFP-UHFFFAOYAS
- SMILES: O=C(NCc1cc(OC)c(O)cc1)CCCCCCCC(C)C

Properties
Chemical formula	C_{19}H_{31}NO_{3}
Molar mass	321.461 g·mol^{−1}
- Except where otherwise noted, data are given for materials in their standard state (at 25 °C [77 °F], 100 kPa). verify (what is ?) Infobox references

Homodihydrocapsaicin
- Heat: Above peak
- Scoville scale: 8,600,000 SHU

Homodihydrocapsaicin is a capsaicinoid and analog and congener of capsaicin in chili peppers (Capsicum). Like capsaicin it is an irritant. Homodihydrocapsaicin accounts for about 1% of the total capsaicinoids mixture and has about half the pungency of capsaicin. Pure homodihydrocapsaicin is a lipophilic colorless odorless crystalline to waxy compound. It produces "numbing burn" in the throat and is one of the most prolonged and difficult to rinse out. On the Scoville scale it has 8,600,000 SHU (Scoville heat units).

== See also ==
- Capsaicin
- Dihydrocapsaicin
- Nordihydrocapsaicin
- Homocapsaicin
- Nonivamide
- Scoville scale
- Pepper spray
- Spice
