= Anisyl acetate =

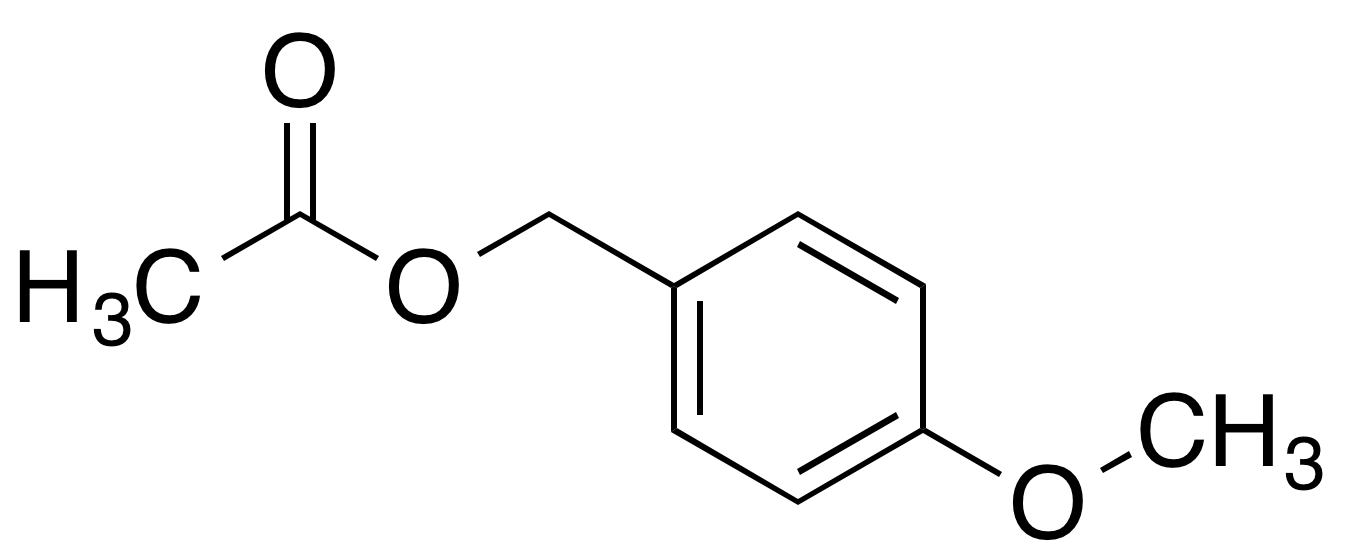

Names
- Preferred IUPAC name (4-Methoxyphenyl)methyl acetate
- Other names p-Methoxybenzyl acetate

Identifiers
CAS Number	104-21-2
3D model (JSmol)	Interactive image
ChemSpider	7410
ECHA InfoCard	100.002.896
EC Number	203-185-8
PubChem CID	7695
UNII	2GEC7KBO31
CompTox Dashboard (EPA)	DTXSID1044770
- InChI: InChI=1S/C10H12O3/c1-8(11)13-7-9-3-5-10(12-2)6-4-9/h3-6H,7H2,1-2H3 Key: HFNGYHHRRMSKEU-UHFFFAOYSA-N
- SMILES: CC(=O)OCC1=CC=C(C=C1)OC

Properties
Chemical formula	C_{10}H_{12}O_{3}
Molar mass	180.203 g·mol^{−1}

Hazards
- GHS labelling
Pictograms	(GHS07: Exclamation mark)
Signal word	Warning
Hazard statements	H315, H317
Precautionary statements	P264, P280, P302+P352, P305+P351+P338, P321, P332+P313, P337+P313, P362
- Except where otherwise noted, data are given for materials in their standard state (at 25 °C [77 °F], 100 kPa). Infobox references

Anisyl acetate (4-methoxybenzyl acetate) is an acetate ester of anisyl alcohol. It is a naturally occurring flavor found in various fruits and types of vanilla. It is also used as a flavoring agent to produce a flavor profile described variously as sweet, smooth, fruity (cherry or plum) and vanilla or almond.
