= Phenylacetylrinvanil =

Chemical compound

Identifiers
- IUPAC name: [(Z,7R)-18-[(4-Hydroxy-3-methoxyphenyl)methylamino]-18-oxooctadec-9-en-7-yl] 2-phenylacetate
- CAS Number: 849343-53-9
- PubChem CID: 25171466
- ChemSpider: 74098843

Chemical and physical data
- Formula: C_{34}H_{49}NO_{5}
- Molar mass: 551.768 g·mol^{−1}
- 3D model (JSmol): Interactive image
- SMILES: CCCCCC[C@H](C/C=C\CCCCCCCC(=O)NCC1=CC(=C(C=C1)O)OC)OC(=O)CC2=CC=CC=C2
- InChI: InChI=1S/C34H49NO5/c1-3-4-5-15-20-30(40-34(38)26-28-18-13-12-14-19-28)21-16-10-8-6-7-9-11-17-22-33(37)35-27-29-23-24-31(36)32(25-29)39-2/h10,12-14,16,18-19,23-25,30,36H,3-9,11,15,17,20-22,26-27H2,1-2H3,(H,35,37)/b16-10-/t30-/m1/s1; Key:LXLBUUJANYSIKU-DJVRBGHSSA-N

Phenylacetylrinvanil (IDN-5890) is a synthetic analogue of capsaicin which acts as a potent and selective agonist for the TRPV1 receptor, with slightly lower potency than resiniferatoxin, though still around 300 times the potency of capsaicin. It is an amide of vanillylamine and ricinoleic acid, with the hydroxyl group on ricinoleic acid esterified with phenylacetic acid. It is used to study the function of the TRPV1 receptor and its downstream actions, and has also shown anti-cancer effects in vitro.
