= Homocapsaicin =

Names
- IUPAC name (6E)-N-(4-Hydroxy-3-methoxybenzyl)-8-methyldec-6-enamide
- Other names Homocapsaicin II, N-Vanillyl-8-methyldec-6-(E)-enamide, trans-N-Vanillyl-8-methyldec-6-enamide, N-(4-Hydroxy-3-methoxybenzyl)-8-methyldec-trans-6-enamide, Vanillylamide of 8-methyldec-trans-6-enoic acid, HC

Identifiers
CAS Number	58493-48-4
3D model (JSmol)	Interactive image
ChemSpider	9848876
PubChem CID	11674147
UNII	S5KLC0JPH3
- InChI: InChI=1S/C19H29NO3/c1-4-15(2)9-7-5-6-8-10-19(22)20-14-16-11-12-17(21)18(13-16)23-3/h7,9,11-13,15,21H,4-6,8,10,14H2,1-3H3,(H,20,22)/b9-7+ Key: MLJGZARGNROKAC-VQHVLOKHSA-N; InChI=1/C19H29NO3/c1-4-15(2)9-7-5-6-8-10-19(22)20-14-16-11-12-17(21)18(13-16)23-3/h7,9,11-13,15,21H,4-6,8,10,14H2,1-3H3,(H,20,22)/b9-7+ Key: MLJGZARGNROKAC-VQHVLOKHBL
- SMILES: O=C(NCC1=CC(OC)=C(O)C=C1)CCCC/C=C/C(CC)C

Properties
Chemical formula	C_{19}H_{29}NO_{3}
Molar mass	319.43 g/mol
- Except where otherwise noted, data are given for materials in their standard state (at 25 °C [77 °F], 100 kPa). verify (what is ?) Infobox references

Homocapsaicin
- Heat: Above peak
- Scoville scale: 8,600,000 SHU

Homocapsaicin is a capsaicinoid and analog and congener of capsaicin in chili peppers (Capsicum). Like capsaicin it is an irritant. Homocapsaicin accounts for about 1% of the total capsaicinoids mixture and has about half the pungency of capsaicin. Pure homocapsaicin is a lipophilic colorless odorless crystalline to waxy compound. On the Scoville scale it has 8,600,000 SHU (Scoville heat units).

Homocapsaicin isolated from chili pepper has been found in two isomeric forms, both with a cis carbon-carbon double bond at the 6 position (numbered from the amide carbon) on the 10-carbon acyl chain. One isomer has an additional carbon, a methyl group, at the 8 position and the other has a methyl group at the 9 position. Homocapsaicin (6-ene-8-methyl) is the more abundant isomer.

Homocapsaicin with the double bond at the 7 position has never been found in nature, though its structure is widely reported on the Internet and in the scientific literature. Details of this misidentification have been published.

== See also ==
- Dihydrocapsaicin
- Nordihydrocapsaicin
- Homodihydrocapsaicin
- Scoville scale
- Pepper spray
- Spice
