= Tinyatoxin =

Names
- Preferred IUPAC name [(2S,3aR,3bS,6aR,9aR,9bR,10R,11aR)-2-Benzyl-6a-hydroxy-8,10-dimethyl-7-oxo-11a-(prop-1-en-2-yl)-3a,3b,6,6a,7,9a,11,11a-octahydro-2H,10H-2,9b-epoxyazuleno[5,4-e][1,3]benzodioxol-5-yl]methyl (4-hydroxyphenyl)acetate

Identifiers
CAS Number	58821-95-7
3D model (JSmol)	Interactive image
ChEBI	CHEBI:9603
ChemSpider	32701427
ECHA InfoCard	100.165.094
MeSH	tinyatoxin
PubChem CID	442098
UNII	WN080Z1OL0
CompTox Dashboard (EPA)	DTXSID40974337
- InChI: InChI=1S/C36H38O8/c1-21(2)34-17-23(4)36-28(32(34)42-35(43-34,44-36)19-25-8-6-5-7-9-25)15-26(18-33(40)29(36)14-22(3)31(33)39)20-41-30(38)16-24-10-12-27(37)13-11-24/h5-15,23,28-29,32,37,40H,1,16-20H2,2-4H3/t23-,28+,29-,32-,33-,34-,35-,36-/m1/s1 Key: WWZMXEIBZCEIFB-ACAXUWNGSA-N
- SMILES: C[C@@H]1C[C@]2([C@H]3[C@H]4[C@]1([C@@H]5C=C(C(=O)[C@]5(CC(=C4)COC(=O)Cc6ccc(cc6)O)O)C)O[C@](O3)(O2)Cc7ccccc7)C(=C)C

Properties
Chemical formula	C_{36}H_{38}O_{8}
Molar mass	598.692 g·mol^{−1}
- Except where otherwise noted, data are given for materials in their standard state (at 25 °C [77 °F], 100 kPa). verify (what is ?) Infobox references

Tinyatoxin
- Heat: Above peak
- Scoville scale: 5,300,000,000 SHU

Tinyatoxin (TTX or TTN) is an analog of the neurotoxin resiniferatoxin. It occurs naturally in Euphorbia poissonii.

It is a neurotoxin that acts via full agonism of the vanilloid receptors of sensory nerves. Tinyatoxin has a potential for pharmaceutical uses similar to uses of capsaicin. Tinyatoxin is about one third as strong as resiniferatoxin but is still an ultrapotent analogue of capsaicin, with a heat intensity estimate of 300 to 350 times that of capsaicin.
