= Capsinoid =

Class of chemical compounds naturally occurring in chili peppers

Capsinoids are non-alkaloid substances naturally present in chili peppers. Although they are structurally similar to capsaicin, the substance that causes pungency in hot peppers, they largely lack that characteristic. Capsinoids have an estimated "hot taste threshold" which is about 1/1000 that of capsaicin. Capsinoids were not reported in the scientific literature until 1989, when biologists first isolated them in a unique variety of chili peppers, CH-19 Sweet, which does not contain capsaicin. Capsinoids include capsiate, dihydrocapsiate, and nordihydrocapsiate.

Many health effects have been ascribed to capsaicin and capsinoids, both anecdotally and through scientific study, including anticancer, anti-inflammatory, and analgesic activities, and weight management.

== Structure ==
Structure of capsinoids, including capsiate, dihydrocapsiate, and nordihydrocapsiate

Structural differences between capsaicin and members of the capsinoid family of compounds are illustrated in the figure. Capsinoids have an ester bond in their structures, as compared with the amide bond characteristic of capsaicin.

== Mechanisms of action: capsaicin vs. capsinoids ==
It is anecdotally said that hot peppers help people in the tropics "cool off". This theory is consistent with the peripheral vasodilatory effect of capsaicin that has been shown to lower skin temperature in humans exposed to a hot environment. Capsaicin feels hot in the mouth because it activates sensory receptors on the tongue otherwise used to detect thermal heat. This receptor is called Transient Receptor Potential Vanilloid 1 (TRPV1). TRPV1 receptors are also located in the gut and in other organs. Stimulation of TRPV1 receptors is known to bring about activation of the sympathetic nervous system (SNS). Capsaicin has been shown to increase fat burning in humans and animals through stimulation of the SNS.

Like capsaicin, capsinoids activate TRPV1 receptors, although they are not hot in the mouth. Capsinoids cannot reach the TRPV1 oral cavity receptors, located slightly below the surface in the mouth, because of structural differences from capsaicin. On the other hand, both capsaicin and capsinoids activate TRPV1 receptors in the same manner. Research has indicated that the TRPV1 receptors in the gut are important for the metabolic effects of capsaicin and capsinoids.

Both energy metabolism and body temperature increases are observed in humans following extracted capsinoids or CH-19 Sweet administration. Animal studies also demonstrate these increases, as well as suppressed in body fat accumulation following capsinoids intake. The exact mechanisms and the relative importance of each remain under investigation, as are the effects of capsinoids on appetite and satiation.

== Safety testing ==
Purified extracts of the sweet chili pepper containing capsinoids have been extensively studied through rigorous safety tests, including evaluation of chronic toxicity, reproduction, genotoxicity, and teratology in animals, single oral administration and pharmacokinetics in humans.

Capsinoids are hydrolyzed before absorption and break down to fatty acids and to vanillyl alcohol. According to human studies conducted to date, intact capsinoids are not present in the bloodstream following oral administration, suggesting minimal concern about untoward activation of TRPV1 receptors in other parts of the body. Single dose oral administration of up to 30 mg capsinoids did not raise blood pressure or heart rate in healthy volunteers, nor did administration of CH-19 Sweet.

== Major capsinoids in nature ==
- Capsiate (4-hydroxy-3-methoxybenzyl (E)-8-methyl-6-nonenoate) (CAS No. 205687-01-0 )
- Dihydrocapsiate (4-hydroxy-3-methoxybenzyl 8-methylnonanoate) (CAS No. 205687-03-2 )
- Nordihydrocapsiate (4-hydroxy-3-methoxybenzyl 7-methyloctanoate) (CAS No. 220012-53-3)
