= Nordihydrocapsaicin =

Chemical compound

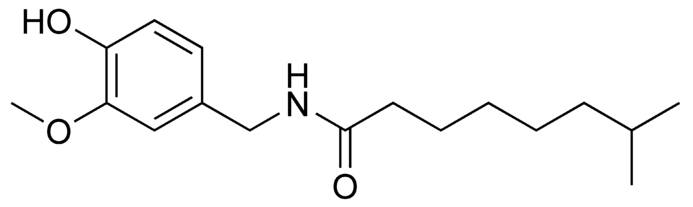
- Structural formula

Names
- Preferred IUPAC name N-[(4-Hydroxy-3-methoxyphenyl)methyl]-7-methyloctanamide
- Other names N-Vanillyl-7-methyloctanamide; Vanillylamide of 7-methyloctanoic acid; NDHC

Identifiers
CAS Number	28789-35-7
3D model (JSmol)	Interactive image
ChemSpider	147689
ECHA InfoCard	100.208.673
PubChem CID	168836
UNII	RF657P8DA8
CompTox Dashboard (EPA)	DTXSID3042217
- InChI: InChI=1S/C17H27NO3/c1-13(2)7-5-4-6-8-17(20)18-12-14-9-10-15(19)16(11-14)21-3/h9-11,13,19H,4-8,12H2,1-3H3,(H,18,20) Key: VQEONGKQWIFHMN-UHFFFAOYSA-N; InChI=1/C17H27NO3/c1-13(2)7-5-4-6-8-17(20)18-12-14-9-10-15(19)16(11-14)21-3/h9-11,13,19H,4-8,12H2,1-3H3,(H,18,20) Key: VQEONGKQWIFHMN-UHFFFAOYAS
- SMILES: CC(C)CCCCCC(=O)NCC1=CC(=C(C=C1)O)OC

Properties
Chemical formula	C_{17}H_{27}NO_{3}
Molar mass	293.407 g·mol^{−1}
Solubility in water	Negligible
Solubility	Soluble in DMSO, chloroform

Hazards
- GHS labelling
Pictograms	(GHS06: Toxic) (GHS07: Exclamation mark)
Hazard statements	H300, H315, H319, H335
Precautionary statements	P264, P270, P280, P302+P352, P305+P351+P338, P321, P330, P362+P364, P405, P501
NFPA 704 (fire diamond)	4 0 0
- Except where otherwise noted, data are given for materials in their standard state (at 25 °C [77 °F], 100 kPa). verify (what is ?) Infobox references

Nordihydrocapsaicin
- Heat: Above peak (pure Nordihydrocapsaicin is highly toxic)
- Scoville scale: 9,100,000 SHU

Nordihydrocapsaicin is a capsaicinoid and analog and congener of capsaicin in chili peppers (Capsicum).

== Properties ==
Like capsaicin, it is an irritant. Nordihydrocapsaicin accounts for about 7% of the total capsaicinoids mixture and has about half the pungency of capsaicin. Pure nordihydrocapsaicin is a lipophilic colorless odorless crystalline to waxy solid. On the Scoville scale it has 9,100,000 SHU (Scoville heat units), significantly higher than pepper spray.

== See also ==
- Capsaicin
- Dihydrocapsaicin
- Homocapsaicin
- Homodihydrocapsaicin
- Nonivamide
- Scoville scale
- Pepper spray
- Spice
