= Iodoresiniferatoxin =

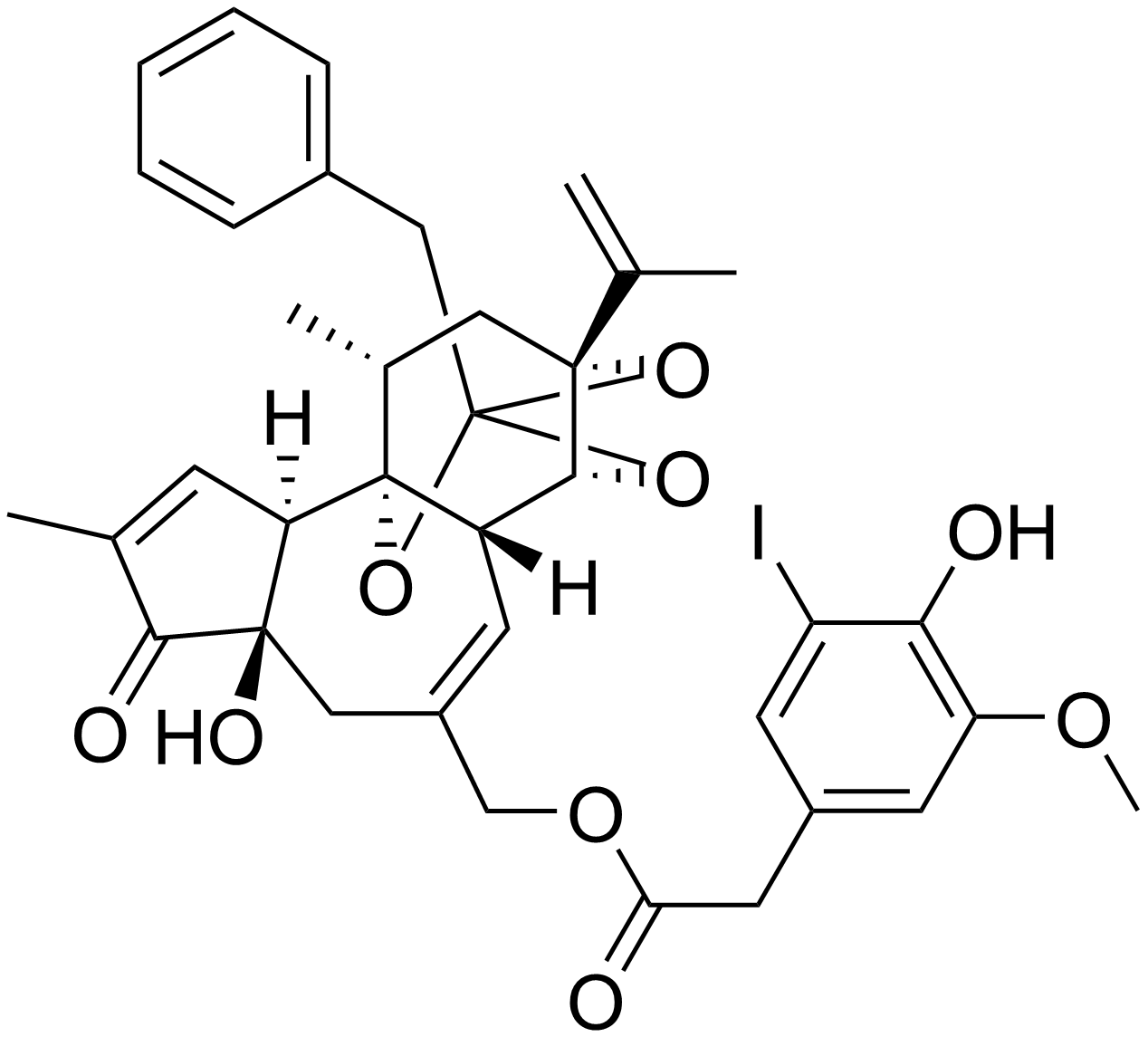

Names
- IUPAC name [(1R,2R,6R,10S,11R,13S,15R,17R)-13-benzyl-6-hydroxy-4,17-dimethyl-5-oxo-15-prop-1-en-2-yl-12,14,18-trioxapentacyclo[11.4.1.0^{1,10}.0^{2,6}.0^{11,15}]octadeca-3,8-dien-8-yl]methyl 2-(4-hydroxy-3-iodo-5-methoxyphenyl)acetate
- Other names 5-Iodoresiniferatoxin

Identifiers
| CAS Number | 535974-91-5 |
| 3D model (JSmol) | Interactive image |
| ChEMBL | ChEMBL595069 |
| ChemSpider | 21169533 |
| PubChem CID | 6324614 |
| CompTox Dashboard (EPA) | DTXSID30585193 |
- InChI: InChI=1S/C37H39IO9/c1-20(2)35-16-22(4)37-26(33(35)45-36(46-35,47-37)18-23-9-7-6-8-10-23)12-25(17-34(42)29(37)11-21(3)32(34)41)19-44-30(39)15-24-13-27(38)31(40)28(14-24)43-5/h6-14,22,26,29,33,40,42H,1,15-19H2,2-5H3/t22-,26+,29-,33-,34-,35-,36-,37-/m1/s1 Key: TZUJORCXGLGWDV-DZBJMWFRSA-N
- SMILES: O=C1C(C)=C[C@@]([C@]1(O)CC(COC(CC2=CC(OC)=C(O)C(I)=C2)=O)=C[C@]([H])3[C@H]4OC5(CC6=CC=CC=C6)O7)([H])[C@@]37[C@H](C)C[C@@]4(O5)C(C)=C

Properties
| Chemical formula | C_{37}H_{39}IO_{9} |
| Molar mass | 754.614 g·mol^{−1} |
- Except where otherwise noted, data are given for materials in their standard state (at 25 °C [77 °F], 100 kPa). verify (what is ?) Infobox references

Iodoresiniferatoxin (I-RTX) is a strong competitive antagonist of the Transient Receptor Potential Vanilloid 1 (TRPV1) receptor. I-RTX is derived from resiniferatoxin (RTX).

== Sources ==
I-RTX can be prepared from RTX by electrophilic aromatic substitution. Iodide substitutes the 5-position.

== Chemistry ==
Iodination of RTX at the 5-position changes the toxin from an TRPV1-receptor agonist into an TRPV1-receptor antagonist, with only a little lower affinity for TRPV1 than RTX.

As RTX, I-RTX belongs to the daphnane family of molecules.

The substance is soluble in DMSO and in ethanol.

Binding of I-RTX is dependent upon temperature and pH value, as has been shown in research with HEK 293 cells expressing TRPV1. The optimal pH value is around 7.8 to 8.0 and binding increases markedly with temperature up to 37 °C and then decreases at higher temperatures.

== Target ==
Initially, iodoresiniferatoxin was thought to be a competitive antagonist of the TRPV1 receptor with high affinity (K_{d} = 4.3 ± 0.9 nM to HEK 293/VR1 and K_{d} = 4.2 ± 1.0 nM to rat spinal cord membranes), but recent research indicated also partial transient agonistic characteristics in the thermoregulatory system in mice, especially in higher concentrations ranging from 1 to 30 μM.

The TRPV1 receptor encodes a protein of 838 amino acids forming a calcium-permeable channel that is activated by capsaicin but also by noxious heat and low extracellular pH. TRPV1 receptors are expressed in many systems in the central and peripheral nervous system, and have a particularly important role in signal conduction in afferent pain pathways.

== Mode of action ==
The proposed molecular mode of action of TRPV1 antagonists is blocking of the channel pore. Several studies using either capsaicin, pH values < 6 or heat as the agonist have shown that I-RTX works as a strong competitive TRPV1 antagonist in vitro.

Recent studies also revealed partial TRPV1-agonist-like effects of I-RTX in the thermoregulatory system in mice, increasing intracellular Ca2+ concentrations. It also exerts weak, partial agonism on recombinant TRPV1 in vitro. This agonistic effect could be due to metabolization whereby I-RTX would be deiodinated, converting it into RTX with its respective characteristics. In vivo, I-RTX showed analgesic activity in the capsaicin pain test. I-RTX thus is able to block TRPV1 mediated nociceptive and neurogenic inflammatory responses.

== Toxicity ==
In mice, I-RTX induces dose-dependent hypothermia in vivo. A statistically significant difference was reported at doses > 0.1 μmol/kg. The maximal effect was found with a dose of 1 μmol/kg, 60 to 100 minutes after administration. No lethality has been reported in this study.

== Therapeutic use ==
Clinical research is done on the use of I-RTX as an analgesic agent, although several drawbacks have been mentioned: complex chemical structure, high costs of production, and relatively unfavourable pharmacokinetic characteristics.
