= TTX =

TTX may refer to:

- Cessna 400 (also Cessna TTx), a single-engine aircraft
- Tetrodotoxin, a neurotoxin discovered in aquatic animals
- Tilting Train Express, a South Korean experimental train
- Tinyatoxin, a highly irritant analog of resiniferatoxin and capsaicin
- Trenitalia Tper, an Italian railway company
- TTX Company, a railroad freight car provider
- Mungalalu Truscott Airbase, IATA airport code "TTX"
