= Isovanilloid =

The isovanilloids are compounds which possess an isovanillyl group. They include isovanillyl alcohol, isovanillin, isovanillic acid, iso-acetovanillon, etc. They are isomers of the vanilloids.

| Structure of isovanillyl alcohol | Structure of isovanillin | Structure of isovanillic acid | Structure of iso-acetovanillon |
| isovanillyl alcohol | isovanillin | isovanillic acid | iso-acetovanillon |

== Literature ==
- Lee, Jeewoo; Uk Kang, Sang; Yeon Kim, Su; Eun Kim, Sung; Joon Jo, Yeong; Kim, Sunghoon (23 April 2001). "Vanilloid and isovanilloid analogues as inhibitors of methionyl-tRNA and isoleucyl-tRNA synthetases" (PDF). Bioorganic & Medicinal Chemistry Letters. 11 (8): 965–968. doi:10.1016/S0960-894X(01)00096-8. PMID 11327601.
