= Vanillyl group =

Functional group in organic chemistry

Vanillyl (blue part) functional group

In organic chemistry, the vanillyl group (also known as vanilloyl) is a functional group. Compounds containing a vanillyl group are called vanilloids, and include vanillin, vanillic acid, capsaicin, vanillylmandelic acid, among others.
