= Anisyl alcohol =

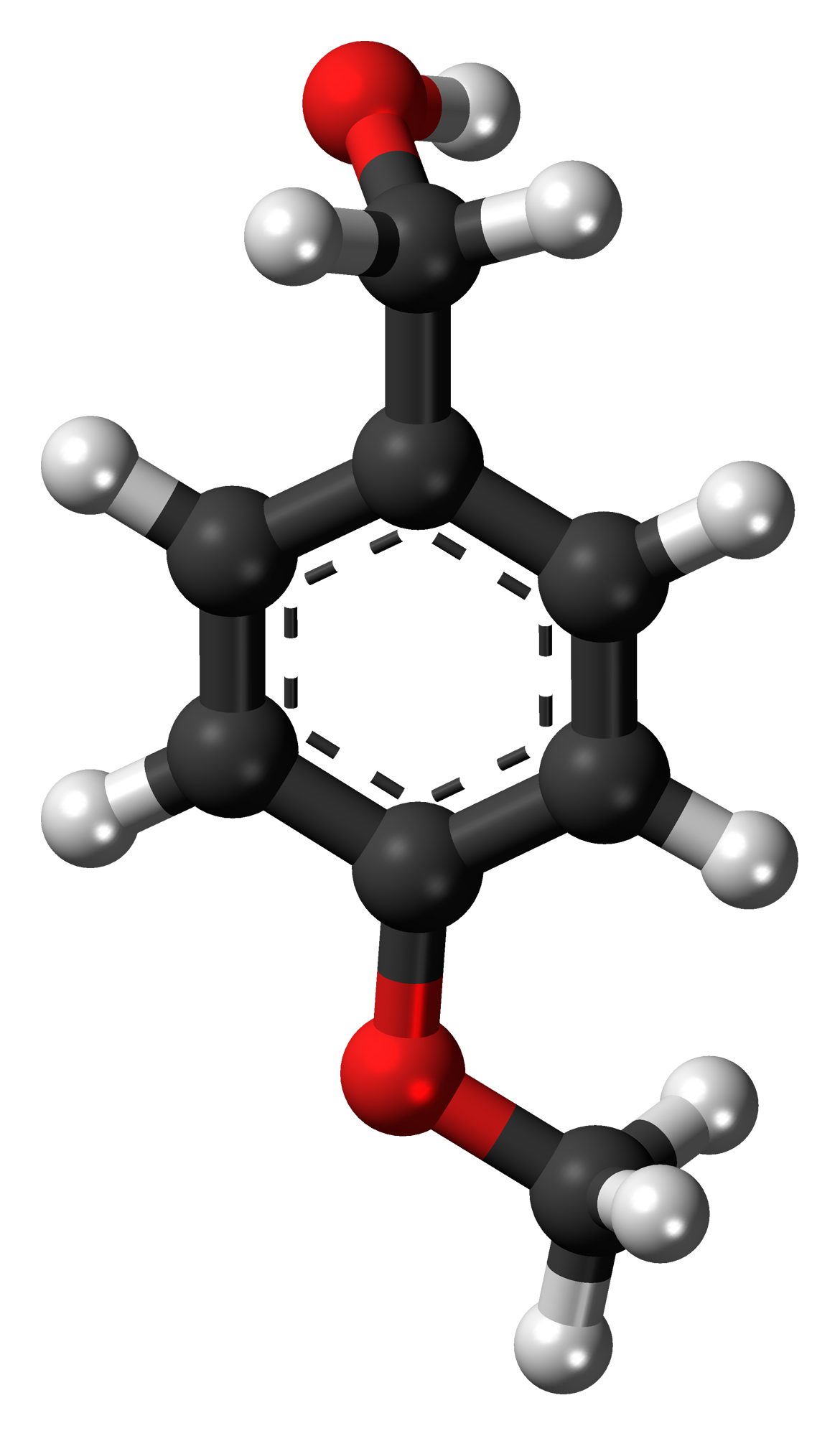

Names
- Preferred IUPAC name (4-Methoxyphenyl)methanol
- Other names 4-Methoxybenzyl alcohol; Anise alcohol

Identifiers
CAS Number	105-13-5
3D model (JSmol)	Interactive image
ChemSpider	21105859
ECHA InfoCard	100.002.976
PubChem CID	7738
UNII	7N6XGV3U49
CompTox Dashboard (EPA)	DTXSID6044357
- InChI: InChI=1S/C8H10O2/c1-10-8-4-2-7(6-9)3-5-8/h2-5,9H,6H2,1H3
- SMILES: COC1=CC=C(C=C1)CO

Properties
Chemical formula	C_{8}H_{10}O_{2}
Molar mass	138.166 g·mol^{−1}
Density	1.113 g/cm^{3}
Melting point	22–25 °C (72–77 °F; 295–298 K)
Boiling point	259 °C (498 °F; 532 K)
Solubility in water	low

Hazards
- Occupational safety and health (OHS/OSH)
Main hazards	Irritant
- Except where otherwise noted, data are given for materials in their standard state (at 25 °C [77 °F], 100 kPa). Infobox references

Anisyl alcohol (4-methoxybenzyl alcohol) is an organic compound with the chemical formula CH_{3}OC_{6}H_{4}CH_{2}OH. It is a colorless liquid that is used as a fragrance and flavorant. It occurs naturally but is produced by reduction of the aldehyde or carboxylic acid. It reacts with hydrogen bromide to give 4-methoxylbenzyl bromide.

== See also ==
- Vanillyl alcohol
