= Vanillylamine =

Names
- Preferred IUPAC name 4-(Aminomethyl)-2-methoxyphenol
- Other names 4-Hydroxy-3-methoxybenzylamine α-Amino-2-methoxy-p-cresol

Identifiers
CAS Number	1196-92-5
3D model (JSmol)	Interactive image
ChemSpider	64127
PubChem CID	70966
UNII	1WEZ91E3Z0
CompTox Dashboard (EPA)	DTXSID90152522
- InChI: InChI=1S/C8H11NO2/c1-11-8-4-6(5-9)2-3-7(8)10/h2-4,10H,5,9H2,1H3 Key: WRPWWVNUCXQDQV-UHFFFAOYSA-N; InChI=1/C8H11NO2/c1-11-8-4-6(5-9)2-3-7(8)10/h2-4,10H,5,9H2,1H3 Key: WRPWWVNUCXQDQV-UHFFFAOYAK
- SMILES: Oc1ccc(cc1OC)CN

Properties
Chemical formula	C_{8}H_{11}NO_{2}
Molar mass	153.181 g·mol^{−1}
- Except where otherwise noted, data are given for materials in their standard state (at 25 °C [77 °F], 100 kPa). Infobox references

Vanillylamine is a chemical compound that is an intermediate in the biosynthesis of capsaicin. Vanillylamine is produced from vanillin by the enzyme vanillin aminotransferase. It is then converted with 8-methyl-6-nonenoic acid into capsaicin by the enzyme capsaicin synthase.

== Reactions ==
Acylation of vanillylamine using Schotten-Baumann reactions can provide amide derivatives. Examples include nonivamide (a component of some pepper sprays), olvanil, and arvanil.
