= Resiniferatoxin =

Names
- IUPAC name [(1R,2R,6R,10S,11R,13R,15R,17R)-13-Benzyl-6-hydroxy-4,17-dimethyl-5-oxo-15-(prop-1-en-2-yl)-12,14,18-trioxapentacyclo[11.4.1.0^{1,10}.0^{2,6}.0^{11,15}]octadeca-3,8-dien-8-yl]methyl 2-(4-hydroxy-3-methoxyphenyl)acetate

Identifiers
CAS Number	57444-62-9
3D model (JSmol)	Interactive image
ChEMBL	ChEMBL448382
ChemSpider	4642871
IUPHAR/BPS	2491
MeSH	resiniferatoxin
PubChem CID	104826
UNII	A5O6P1UL4I
CompTox Dashboard (EPA)	DTXSID00894764
- InChI: InChI=1S/C37H40O9/c1-21(2)35-17-23(4)37-27(33(35)44-36(45-35,46-37)19-24-9-7-6-8-10-24)14-26(18-34(41)30(37)13-22(3)32(34)40)20-43-31(39)16-25-11-12-28(38)29(15-25)42-5/h6-15,23,27,30,33,38,41H,1,16-20H2,2-5H3/t23-,27+,30-,33-,34-,35-,36-,37-/m1/s1 Key: DSDNAKHZNJAGHN-MXTYGGKSSA-N
- SMILES: C[C@@H]1C[C@]2([C@H]3[C@H]4[C@]1([C@@H]5C=C(C(=O)[C@]5(CC(=C4)COC(=O)Cc6ccc(c(c6)OC)O)O)C)O[C@](O3)(O2)Cc7ccccc7)C(=C)C

Properties
Chemical formula	C_{37}H_{40}O_{9}
Molar mass	628.718 g·mol^{−1}
Density	1.35 ± 0.1 g/cm^{3}
Solubility in water	insoluble in water and hexane, soluble in ethyl acetate, ethanol, methanol, acetone, chloroform, and dichloromethane.
- Except where otherwise noted, data are given for materials in their standard state (at 25 °C [77 °F], 100 kPa). verify (what is ?) Infobox references

Resiniferatoxin
- Heat: Highly toxic and caustic non-capsaicinoid TRPV1 agonist - considered "above peak"
- Scoville scale: 16,000,000,000 SHU

Resiniferatoxin (RTX) is a naturally occurring chemical found in resin spurge (Euphorbia resinifera), a cactus-like plant commonly found in Morocco, and in Euphorbia poissonii found in northern Nigeria. It is a potent functional analog of capsaicin, the active ingredient in chili peppers.

== Biological activity ==
Resiniferatoxin has a score of 16 billion Scoville heat units, making pure resiniferatoxin about 500 to 1000 times hotter than pure capsaicin. Resiniferatoxin activates transient vanilloid receptor 1 (TRPV1) in a subpopulation of primary afferent sensory neurons involved in nociception, the transmission of physiological pain. TRPV1 is an ion channel in the plasma membrane of sensory neurons and stimulation by resiniferatoxin causes this ion channel to become permeable to cations, especially calcium. The influx of cations causes the neuron to depolarize, transmitting signals similar to those that would be transmitted if the innervated tissue were being burned or damaged. This stimulation is followed by desensitization and analgesia, in part because the nerve endings die from calcium overload.

== Total synthesis ==
A total synthesis of (+)-resiniferatoxin was completed by the Paul Wender group at Stanford University in 1997. The process begins with a starting material of 1,4-pentadien-3-ol and consists of more than 25 significant steps. As of 2007, this represented the only complete total synthesis of any member of the daphnane family of molecules.

One of the main challenges in synthesizing a molecule such as resiniferatoxin is forming the three-ring backbone of the structure. The Wender group was able to form the first ring of the structure by first synthesizing Structure 1 in Figure 1. By reducing the ketone of Structure 1 followed by oxidizing the furan nucleus with m-CPBA and converting the resulting hydroxy group to an oxyacetate, Structure 2 can be obtained. Structure 2 contains the first ring of the three-ring structure of RTX. It reacts through an oxidopyrylium cycloaddition when heated with DBU in acetonitrile to form Structure 4 by way of Intermediate 3. Several steps of synthesis are required to form Structure 5 from Structure 4, with the main goal of positioning the allylic branch of the seven-membered ring in a trans conformation. Once this conformation is achieved, zirconocene-mediated cyclization of Structure 5 can occur, and oxidizing the resulting hydroxy group with TPAP will yield Structure 6. Structure 6 contains all three rings of the RTX backbone and can then be converted to resiniferatoxin through additional synthesis steps attaching the required functional groups.

An alternative approach to synthesizing the three-ring backbone makes use of radical reactions to create the first and third rings in a single step, followed by the creation of the remaining ring. It has been proposed by the Masayuki Inoue group of the University of Tokyo.

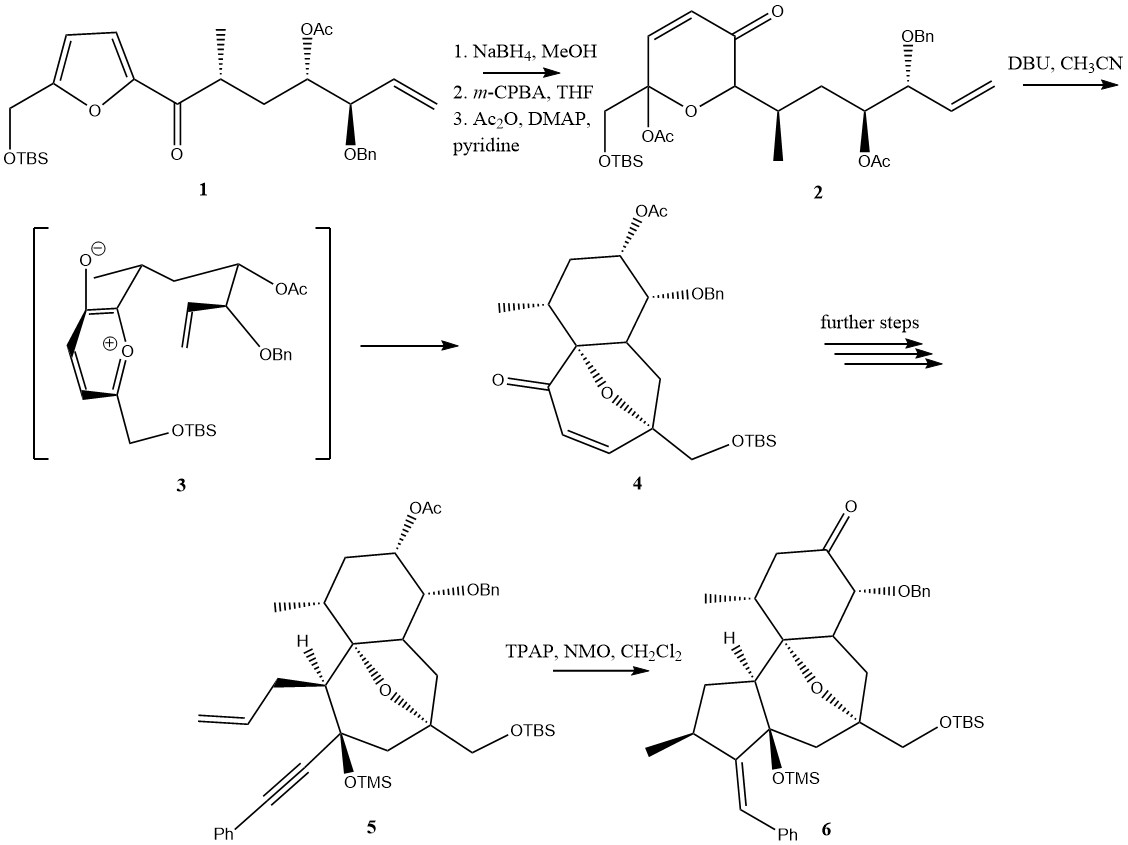
Figure 1. A partial synthesis of a resiniferatoxin derivative based on the method put forth by the Wender group of Stanford University. This partial synthesis shows how to create the three-ring backbone of RTX

== Toxicity ==
At 16 billion Scoville units, resiniferatoxin is toxic and can inflict chemical burns in minute quantities. The primary action of resiniferatoxin is to activate sensory neurons responsible for the perception of pain. It is currently the most potent TRPV1 agonist known, with a binding affinity for TRPV1 about 500 times higher than pure capsaicin, the active ingredient in hot chili peppers such as those produced by Capsicum annuum. It is 1000-10,000 times more potent than capsaicin for effects on thermoregulation and neurogenic inflammation. For rats, LD50 through oral ingestion is 148.1 mg/kg. It causes severe burning pain in sub-microgram (less than 1/1,000,000th of a gram) quantities when ingested orally.

== Research ==
The nerve desensitizing properties of RTX are thought to be useful to treat overactive bladder (OAB) by preventing the bladder from transmitting "sensations of urgency" to the brain, similar to how they can prevent nerves from transmitting signals of pain; RTX has never received Federal Drug Administration approval for this use. RTX has also previously been investigated as a treatment for interstitial cystitis, rhinitis, and lifelong premature ejaculation (PE).

== See also ==
- Discovery and development of TRPV1 antagonists
- Iodoresiniferatoxin
- List of investigational analgesics
- Phenylacetylrinvanil
- Transient receptor potential
- Tinyatoxin
