= Vanillyl alcohol =

Names
- Preferred IUPAC name 4-(Hydroxymethyl)-2-methoxyphenol
- Other names 3-Methoxy-4-hydroxybenzyl alcohol 4-Hydroxy-3-methoxybenzenemethanol; 4-Hydroxy-3-methoxybenzyl alcohol Vanillic alcohol Vanillin alcohol

Identifiers
CAS Number	498-00-0
ChEBI	CHEBI:18353
ChemSpider	56139
ECHA InfoCard	100.007.140
PubChem CID	62348
UNII	X7EA1JUA6M
CompTox Dashboard (EPA)	DTXSID20198074
- InChI: InChI=1S/C8H10O3/c1-11-8-4-6(5-9)2-3-7(8)10/h2-4,9-10H,5H2,1H3

Properties
Chemical formula	C_{8}H_{10}O_{3}
Molar mass	154.165 g·mol^{−1}
Appearance	Crystalline white to off-white powder
Melting point	113 °C (235 °F; 386 K)
Boiling point	293 °C (559 °F; 566 K)
Acidity (pK_{a})	9.75

Related compounds
Related phenols	vanillic acid, vanillin
- Except where otherwise noted, data are given for materials in their standard state (at 25 °C [77 °F], 100 kPa). Infobox references

Vanillyl alcohol is derived from vanillin. It is used to flavor food and scent fragrances, and is described to have a mild, sweet, balsamic vanilla-like scent. Recent studies have shown that vanillyl alcohol has some neuro-protective effects by suppressing the oxidative stress and anti-apoptotic activity in toxin-induced dopaminergic MN9D cells. This could make it a potential candidate for the treatment of neurodegenerative diseases like Parkinson's disease.

== Chemistry ==
Vanillyl alcohol can be produced by reducing vanillin with sodium borohydride under basic conditions, then quenching using a strong acid such as hydrochloric acid.

== See also ==
- Anisyl alcohol
- Guaiacol
