= Vanillic acid =

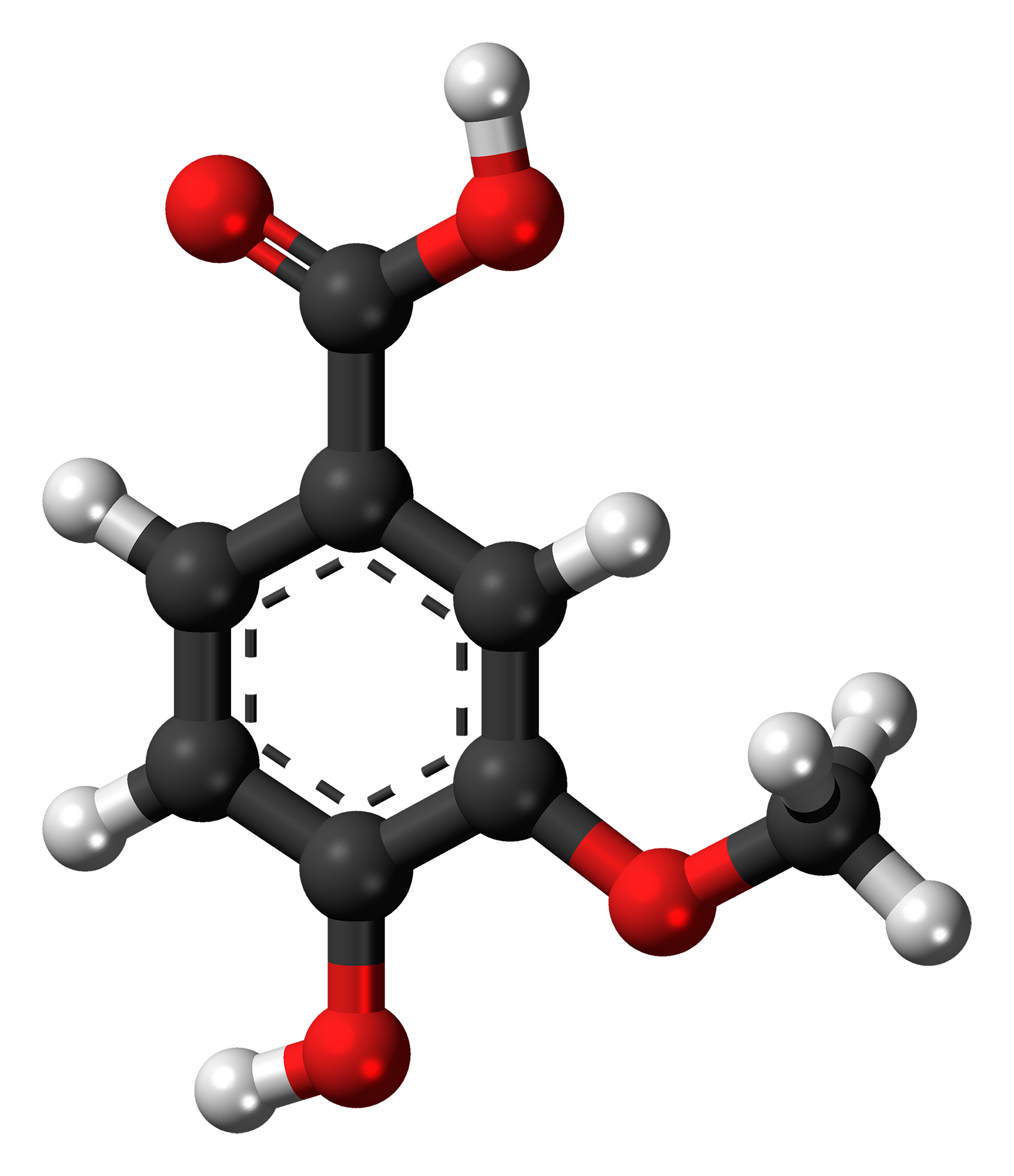

Names
- Preferred IUPAC name 4-Hydroxy-3-methoxybenzoic acid
- Other names 4-Hydroxy-m-anisic acid, Vanillate

Identifiers
CAS Number	121-34-6
3D model (JSmol)	Interactive image
ChEBI	CHEBI:30816
ChEMBL	ChEMBL120568
ChemSpider	8155
ECHA InfoCard	100.004.061
KEGG	C06672
PubChem CID	8468
UNII	GM8Q3JM2Y8
CompTox Dashboard (EPA)	DTXSID6059522
- InChI: InChI=1S/C8H8O4/c1-12-7-4-5(8(10)11)2-3-6(7)9/h2-4,9H,1H3,(H,10,11) Key: WKOLLVMJNQIZCI-UHFFFAOYSA-N; InChI=1/C8H8O4/c1-12-7-4-5(8(10)11)2-3-6(7)9/h2-4,9H,1H3,(H,10,11) Key: WKOLLVMJNQIZCI-UHFFFAOYAH
- SMILES: COc1cc(ccc1O)C(=O)O

Properties
Chemical formula	C_{8}H_{8}O_{4}
Molar mass	168.148 g·mol^{−1}
Appearance	White to light yellow powder or crystals
Melting point	210 to 213 °C (410 to 415 °F; 483 to 486 K)

Hazards
NFPA 704 (fire diamond)	1 0 0

Related compounds
Related compounds	Vanillin, vanillyl alcohol
- Except where otherwise noted, data are given for materials in their standard state (at 25 °C [77 °F], 100 kPa). verify (what is ?) Infobox references

Vanillic acid (4-hydroxy-3-methoxybenzoic acid) is a dihydroxybenzoic acid derivative used as a flavoring agent. It is an oxidized form of vanillin. It is also an intermediate in the production of vanillin from ferulic acid.

== Occurrence in nature ==
The highest amount of vanillic acid in plants known so far is found in the root of Angelica sinensis, an herb indigenous to China, which is used in traditional Chinese medicine.

=== Occurrences in food ===
Açaí oil, obtained from the fruit of the açaí palm (Euterpe oleracea), is rich in vanillic acid (1616±94 mg/kg). It is also found in wine and vinegar and is one of the main natural phenols in argan oil.

== Metabolism ==
Vanillic acid is one of the major metabolites of catechins found in humans after consumption of green tea.

== Synthesis ==
Vanillic acid can be obtained by the oxidation of vanillin using various oxidizing agents.
