= Nonivamide =

Spicy food additive

Names
- Preferred IUPAC name N-[(4-Hydroxy-3-methoxyphenyl)methyl]nonanamide
- Other names Pseudocapsaicin; Vanillyl-N-nonylamide; Vanillylamide of n-nonanoic acid; VNA; Nonylic acid vanillyl amide; Pelargonic acid vanillylamide (PAVA); Pelargonyl vanillyl amide

Identifiers
CAS Number	2444-46-4
3D model (JSmol)	Interactive image
ChEBI	CHEBI:46936
ChemSpider	2891
ECHA InfoCard	100.017.713
EC Number	219-46-4
KEGG	D08282
PubChem CID	2998
UNII	S846B891OR
CompTox Dashboard (EPA)	DTXSID1034769
- InChI: InChI=1S/C17H27NO3/c1-3-4-5-6-7-8-9-17(20)18-13-14-10-11-15(19)16(12-14)21-2/h10-12,19H,3-9,13H2,1-2H3,(H,18,20) Key: RGOVYLWUIBMPGK-UHFFFAOYSA-N; InChI=1/C17H27NO3/c1-3-4-5-6-7-8-9-17(20)18-13-14-10-11-15(19)16(12-14)21-2/h10-12,19H,3-9,13H2,1-2H3,(H,18,20) Key: RGOVYLWUIBMPGK-UHFFFAOYAC
- SMILES: CCCCCCCCC(=O)NCC1=CC(=C(C=C1)O)OC

Properties
Chemical formula	C_{17}H_{27}NO_{3}
Molar mass	293.407 g·mol^{−1}
Appearance	White to off-white powder
Odor	Pungent
Density	1.10 g/cm^{3}
Melting point	54 °C (129 °F; 327 K)
Solubility in water	Insoluble
Solubility	Soluble in methanol

Hazards
Flash point	190 °C (374 °F; 463 K) (closed cup)
Autoignition temperature	330 °C (626 °F; 603 K)
- Lethal dose or concentration (LD, LC)
LD_{50} (median dose)	511 mg/kg (rat, oral)
- Except where otherwise noted, data are given for materials in their standard state (at 25 °C [77 °F], 100 kPa). verify (what is ?) Infobox references

Nonivamide
- Heat: Above peak
- Scoville scale: 9,200,000 SHU

Nonivamide, also called pelargonic acid vanillylamide or PAVA, is an organic compound and a capsaicinoid. It is an amide of pelargonic acid (n-nonanoic acid) and vanillyl amine. It is present in chili peppers, but is commonly manufactured synthetically. It is more heat-stable than capsaicin.

Nonivamide is used as a food additive to add pungency to seasonings, flavorings, and spice blends. It is also used in the confectionery industry to create a hot sensation, and in the pharmaceutical industry in some formulations as a cheaper alternative to capsaicin.

Like capsaicin, it can deter mammals (but not birds or insects) from consuming plants or seeds (e.g. squirrels and bird feeder seeds). This is consistent with nonivamide's role as a TRPV1 ion channel agonist. Mammalian TRPV1 is activated by heat and capsaicin, but the avian form is insensitive to capsaicin.

Nonivamide is used (under the name PAVA) as the payload in "less-lethal munitions" such as the FN Herstal's FN 303 projectiles or as the active ingredient in most pepper sprays, which may be used as a chemical weapon. As a chemical irritant, pepper sprays have been used both as a riot control munition and also a weapon to disperse peaceful demonstrators; they have also been used in other contexts, such as military or police training exercises. While irritants commonly cause only "transient lacrimation, blepharospasm, superficial pain, and disorientation," their use and misuse also presents serious risks of more severe injury and disability.

== Treatment ==
Nonivamide is not soluble in water, however water will dilute it and wash it away. One study found that milk of magnesia, baby shampoo, 2% lidocaine gel, or milk, did not demonstrate significantly better performance than water, when used on pepper spray.

== See also ==
- PAVA spray, a type of pepper spray
- Phenylacetylrinvanil, a synthetic analogue of capsaicin
