= Irritation =

State of inflammation

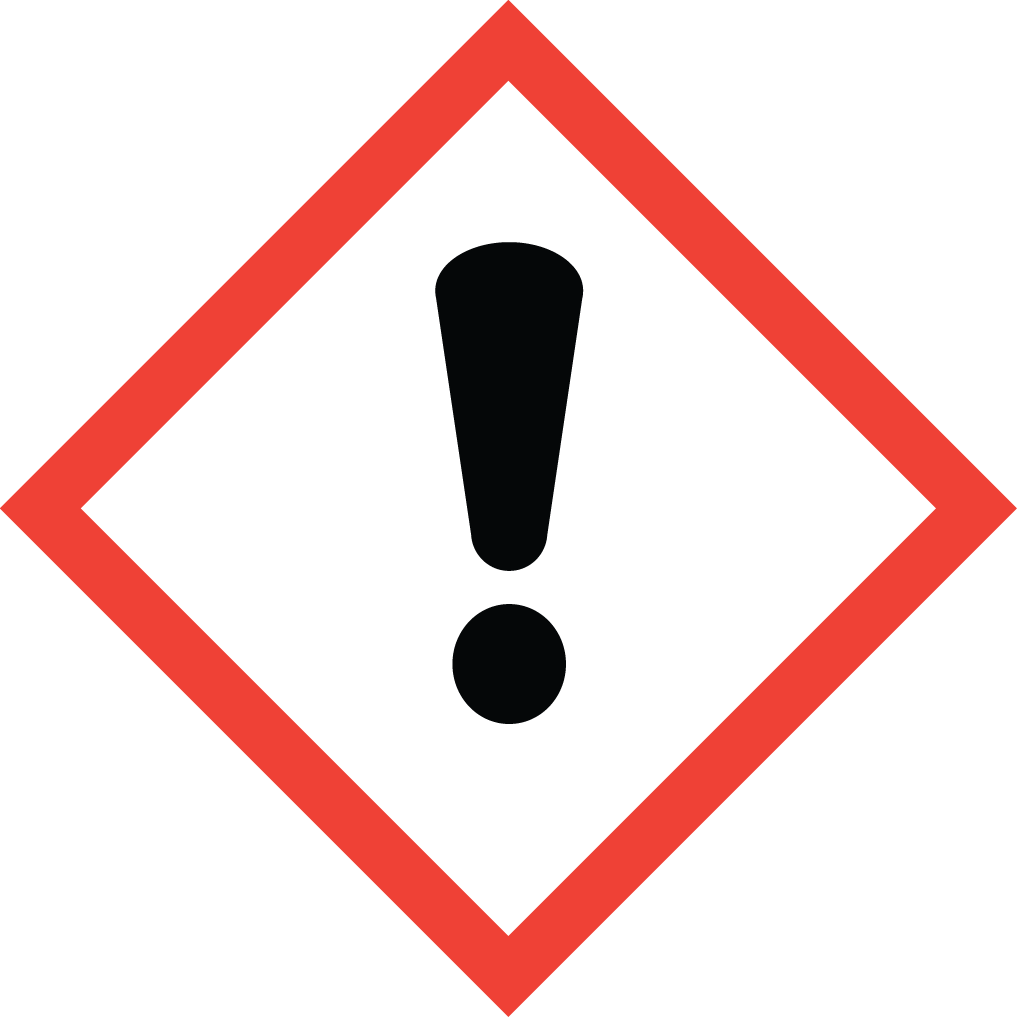
In the OSHA universe, the Exclamation Mark signifies an immediate skin, eye or respiratory tract irritant, or narcotic.

Irritation, in biology and physiology, is a state of inflammation or painful reaction to allergy or cell-lining damage. A stimulus or agent which induces the state of irritation is an irritant. Irritants are typically thought of as chemical agents (for example phenol and capsaicin) but mechanical, thermal (heat), and radiative stimuli (for example ultraviolet light or ionising radiations) can also be irritants. Irritation also has non-clinical usages referring to bothersome physical or psychological pain or discomfort.

Irritation can also be induced by some allergic response due to exposure of some allergens for example contact dermatitis, irritation of mucosal membranes and pruritus. Mucosal membrane is the most common site of irritation because it contains secretory glands that release mucus which attracts the allergens due to its sticky nature.

Chronic irritation is a medical term signifying that afflictive health conditions have been present for a while. There are many disorders that can cause chronic irritation, the majority involve the skin, vagina, eyes and lungs.

== Irritation in organisms ==
In higher organisms, an allergic response may be the cause of irritation. An allergen is defined distinctly from an irritant, however, as allergy requires a specific interaction with the immune system and is thus dependent on the (possibly unique) sensitivity of the organism involved while an irritant, classically, acts in a non-specific manner.

It is a form of stress, but conversely, if one is stressed by unrelated matters, mild imperfections can cause more irritation than usual: one is irritable; see also sensitivity (human).

In more basic organisms, the status of pain is the perception of the being stimulated, which is not observable although it may be shared (see Gate control theory).

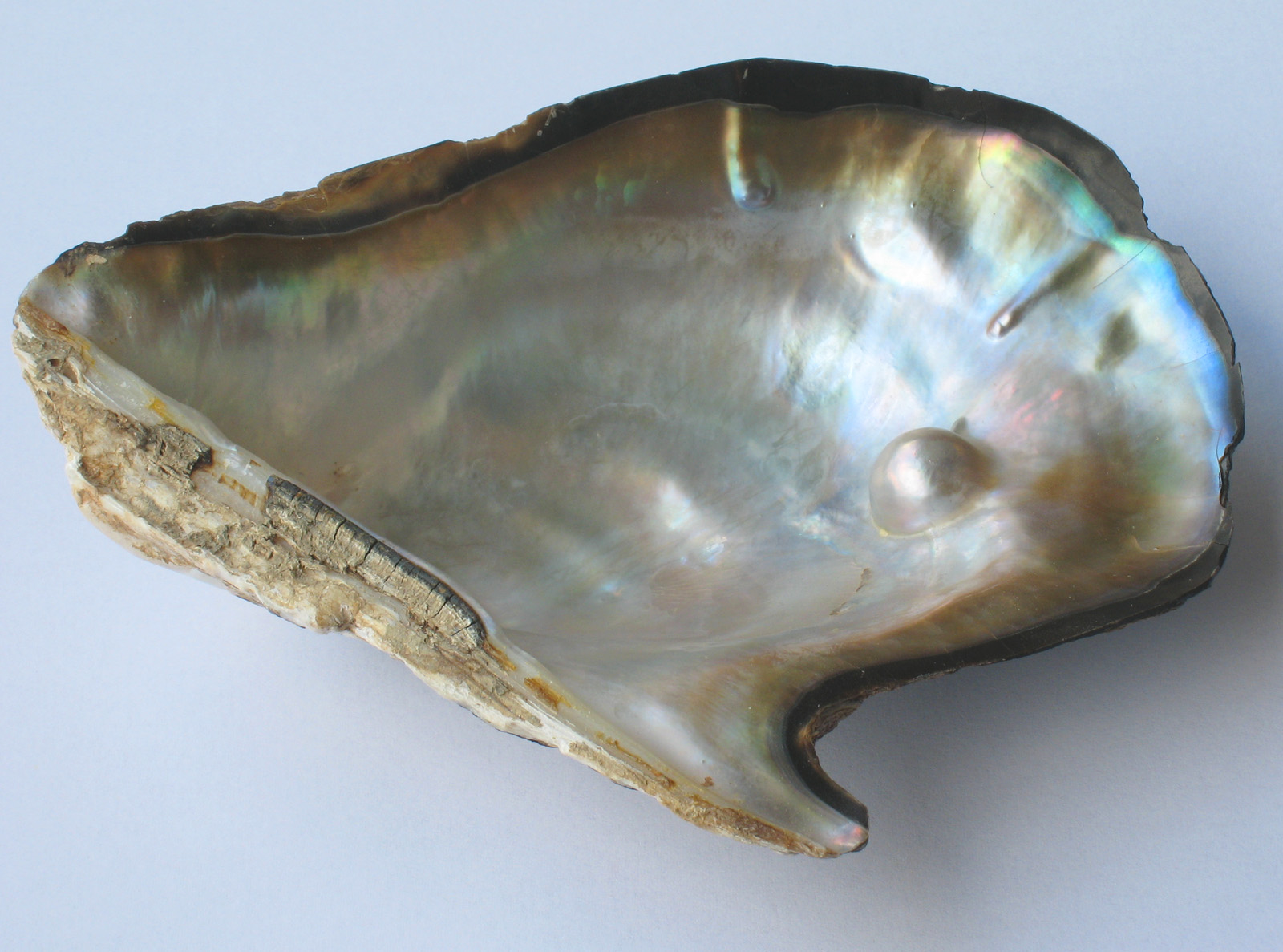
Pearl oyster

It is not proven that oysters can feel pain, but it is known that they react to irritants. When an irritating object becomes trapped within an oyster's shell, it deposits layers of calcium carbonate (CaCO_{3}), slowly increasing in size and producing a pearl. This is purely a defense mechanism, to trap a potentially threatening irritant such as a parasite inside its shell, or an attack from outside, injuring the mantle tissue. The oyster creates a pearl sac to seal off the irritation.

It has also been observed that an amoeba avoids being prodded with a pin, but there is not enough evidence to suggest how much it feels this. Irritation is apparently the only universal sense shared by even single-celled creatures.

It is postulated that most such beings also feel pain, but this is a projection – empathy. Some philosophers, notably René Descartes, denied it entirely, even for such higher mammals as dogs or primates like monkeys; Descartes considered intelligence a pre-requisite for the feeling of pain.

== Types ==
=== Eye irritation ===
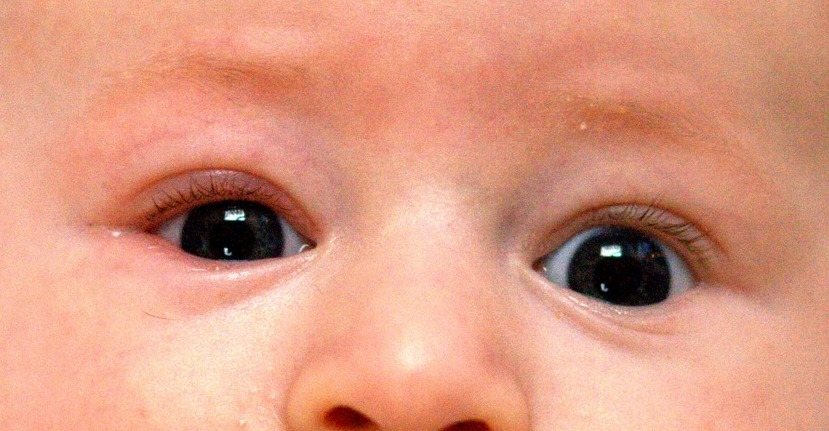
Infant with blepharitis on the right eye

Modern office work with use of office equipment has raised concerns about possible adverse health effects. Since the 1970s, reports have linked mucosal, skin, and general symptoms to work with self-copying paper. Emission of various particulate and volatile substances has been suggested as specific causes. These symptoms have been related to Sick Building Syndrome, which involves symptoms such as irritation to the eyes, skin, and upper airways, headache and fatigue.

The eye is also a source of chronic irritation. Disorders like Sjögren's syndrome, where one does not make tears, can cause a dry eye sensation which feels very unpleasant. The condition is difficult to treat and is lifelong. Besides artificial tears, there is a drug called Restasis which may help.

Blepharitis is dryness and itching on the upper eyelids. This condition is often seen in young people and can lead to reddish dry eye and scaly eyebrows. To relieve the itching sensation, one may need to apply warm compresses and use topical corticosteroid creams.

=== Skin ===
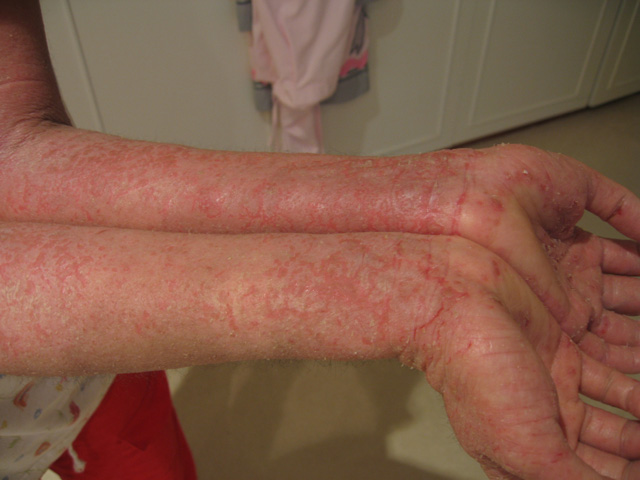
Eczema arms

Eczema is another cause of chronic irritation and affects millions of individuals. Eczema simply means a dry skin which is itchy. The condition usually starts at an early age and continues throughout life. The major complaint of people with eczema is an itchy dry skin. Sometimes, the itching will be associated with a skin rash. The affected areas are always dry, scaly, reddish and may ooze sometimes. Eczema cannot be cured, but its symptoms can be controlled. One should use moisturizers, use cold compresses and avoid frequent hot showers. There are over the counter corticosteroids creams which can be applied. Sometimes, an anti histamine has to be used to prevent the chronic itching sensations. There are also many individuals who have allergies to a whole host of substances like nuts, hair, dander, plants and fabrics. For these individuals, even the minimal exposure can lead to a full blown skin rash, itching, wheezing and coughing. Unfortunately, other than avoidance, there is no other cure. There are allergy shots which can help desensitize against an allergen but often the results are poor and the treatments are expensive. Most of these individuals with chronic irritation from allergens usually need to take anti histamines or use a bronchodilator to relieve symptoms.

Another common irritation disorder in females is intertrigo. This disorder is associated with chronic irritation under folds of skin. This is typically seen under large breasts, groins and folds of the abdomen in obese individuals. Candida quickly grows in warm moist areas of these folds and presents as a chronic itch. Over time, the skin becomes red and often oozes. Perspiration is also a chronic type of irritation which can be very annoying. Besides being socially unacceptable, sweat stain the clothes and can present with a foul odor. In some individuals, the warm moist areas often become easily infected. The best way to treat excess sweating is good hygiene, frequent change of clothes and use of deodorants/antiperspirants.

=== Vaginal irritation ===
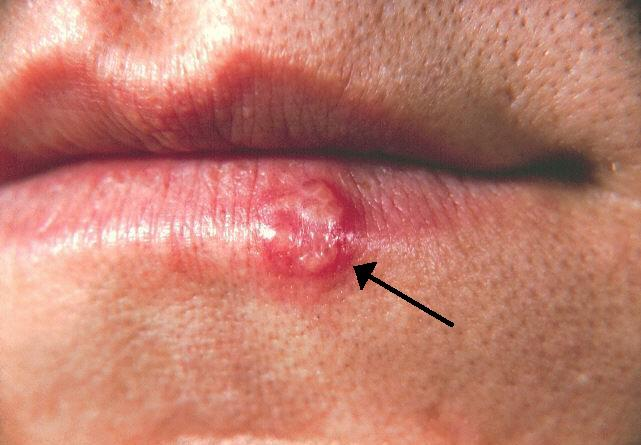
Herpes simplex lesion of lower lip, second day after onset

One of the most common areas of the body associated with irritation is the vagina. Many women complain of an itch, dryness, or discharge in the perineum at some point in their lives. There are several causes of vaginal irritation including fungal vaginitis (like candida) or trichomoniasis. Often, herpes simplex infection of the mouth or genitalia can be recurrent and prove to be extremely irritating. Sometimes, the irritation can be of the chronic type and it can be so intense that it also causes painful intercourse. Aside from infections, chronic irritation of the vagina may be related to the use of contraceptives and condoms made from latex. The majority of contraceptives are made of synthetic chemicals which can induce allergies, rash and itching. Sometimes the lubricant used for intercourse may cause irritation. Another cause of irritation in women is post menopausal vaginitis. The decline in the female sex hormones leads to development of dryness and itching in the vagina. This is often accompanied by painful sexual intercourse. Cracks and tears often develop on outer aspects of the labia which becomes red from chronic scratching. Post menopausal vaginitis can be treated with short term use of vaginal estrogen pessary and use of a moisturizer.

=== Lungs ===
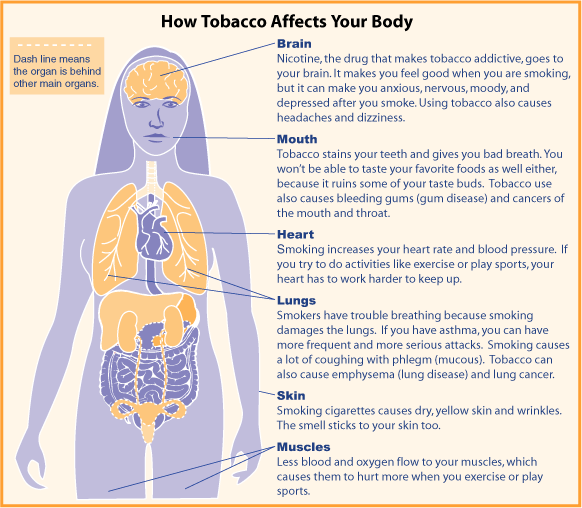
How tobacco affects your body

Individuals who smoke or are exposed to smog or other airborne pollutants can develop a condition known as COPD. In this disorder, there is constant irritation of the breathing tubes (trachea) and the small airways. The constant irritation results in excess production of mucus which makes breathing difficult. Frequently, these individuals wake up in the morning with copious amounts of foul smelling mucus and a cough which lasts all day. Wheeze and heavy phlegm are common findings. COPD is a lifelong disorder and there is no cure. Eventually most people develop recurrent pneumonia, lack any type of endurance, and are unable to work productively. One of the ways to avoid chronic bronchitis is to stop or not smoke.

=== Stomach ===
Gastritis or stomach upset is a common irritating disorder affecting millions of people. Gastritis is basically inflammation of the stomach wall lining and has many causes. Smoking, excess alcohol consumption and the use of non-steroidal anti-inflammatory drugs (NSAIDs), such as ibuprofen, account for the majority of causes of gastritis. In some cases, gastritis may develop after surgery, a major burn, infection or emotional stress. The most common symptoms of gastritis include sharp abdominal pain which may radiate to the back. This may be associated with nausea, vomiting, abdominal bloating and a lack of appetite. When the condition is severe it may even result in loss of blood on the stools. The condition often comes and goes for years because most people continue to drink alcohol or use NSAIDs. Treatment includes the use of antacids or acid neutralizing drugs, antibiotics, and avoiding spicy food and alcohol.

== See also ==
- Allergy
- Irritability (psychology)
- Itch
- Stimulus (physiology)
