= SB-366791 =

Chemical compound

Identifiers
- IUPAC name: (E)-3-(4-chlorophenyl)-N-(3-methoxyphenyl)prop-2-enamide
- CAS Number: 472981-92-3
- PubChem CID: 667594
- ChemSpider: 580962
- UNII: E8EY4M2N4H
- ChEBI: CHEBI:93038
- ChEMBL: ChEMBL122413

Chemical and physical data
- Formula: C_{16}H_{14}ClNO_{2}
- Molar mass: 287.74 g·mol^{−1}
- 3D model (JSmol): Interactive image
- SMILES: COC1=CC=CC(=C1)NC(=O)/C=C/C2=CC=C(C=C2)Cl
- InChI: InChI=1S/C16H14ClNO2/c1-20-15-4-2-3-14(11-15)18-16(19)10-7-12-5-8-13(17)9-6-12/h2-11H,1H3,(H,18,19)/b10-7+; Key:RYAMDQKWNKKFHD-JXMROGBWSA-N

SB-366791 is a drug which acts as a potent and selective blocker of the TRPV1 ion channel. It has analgesic effects in animal studies, and is used in research into pain and inflammation.

== See also ==
- AMG-517
- AMG-9810
- Discovery and development of TRPV1 antagonists
