= TRPA1 =

Protein and coding gene in humans

Identifiers
- Aliases: TRPA1, ANKTM1, FEPS, transient receptor potential cation channel subfamily A member 1, FEPS1
- External IDs: OMIM: 604775; MGI: 3522699; GeneCards: TRPA1
Available structures
| PDB | Ortholog search: PDBe RCSB |
| PDB | List of PDB id codes 3J9P |

Gene location (Human)
| Chr. | Chromosome 8 (human) |
| Band | 8q21.11 | Start | 72,019,917 bp |
| Band | 8q21.11 | End | 72,075,584 bp |

Gene location (Mouse)
| Chr. | Chromosome 1 (mouse) |
| Band | 1|1 A3 | Start | 14,942,872 bp |
| Band | 1|1 A3 | End | 14,989,086 bp |
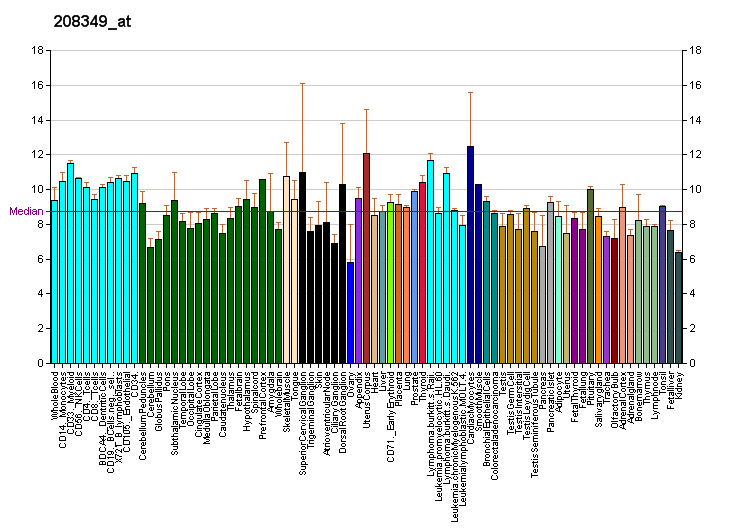

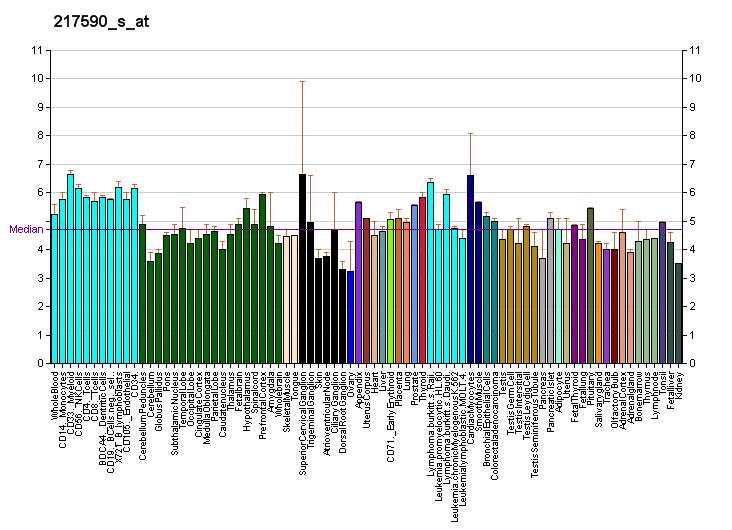
RNA expression pattern
| Bgee | Human / Mouse (ortholog); Top expressed in: oocyte; secondary oocyte; mucosa of urinary bladder; mucosa of sigmoid colon; rectum; mucosa of ileum; epithelium of colon; jejunal mucosa; gonad; mucosa of transverse colon / Top expressed in: lumbar spinal ganglion; secondary oocyte; primary oocyte; zygote; embryo; glossopharyngeal ganglion; embryo; epiblast; jejunum; colon; More reference expression data |
| BioGPS | More reference expression data |
Gene ontology
| Molecular function | channel activity; calcium-release channel activity; ion channel activity; temperature-gated cation channel activity; calcium channel activity; identical protein binding |
| Cellular component | stereocilium bundle; integral component of membrane; membrane; plasma membrane; integral component of plasma membrane |
| Biological process | response to organic cyclic compound; detection of chemical stimulus involved in sensory perception of pain; response to stimulus; ion transport; response to organic substance; cell surface receptor signaling pathway; response to pain; calcium ion transmembrane transport; response to cold; sensory perception of pain; protein homotetramerization; response to hydrogen peroxide; thermoception; calcium ion transport; detection of mechanical stimulus involved in sensory perception of pain; release of sequestered calcium ion into cytosol; transmembrane transport; ion transmembrane transport |
Sources:Amigo / QuickGO
Orthologs
| Databases | NCBI: entry; OMA: entry |
| Species | Human | Mouse |
| Entrez | 8989 | 277328 |
| Ensembl | ENSG00000104321 | ENSMUSG00000032769 |
| UniProt | O75762 | Q8BLA8 |
| RefSeq (mRNA) | NM_007332 | NM_177781; NM_001348288 |
| RefSeq (protein) | NP_015628 | NP_808449; NP_001335217 |
| Location (UCSC) | Chr 8: 72.02 – 72.08 Mb | Chr 1: 14.94 – 14.99 Mb |
| PubMed search |
- Wikidata
| View/Edit Human | View/Edit Mouse |

Transient receptor potential cation channel, subfamily A, member 1, also known as transient receptor potential ankyrin 1, TRPA1, or The Mustard and Wasabi Receptor, is a protein that in humans is encoded by the TRPA1 (and in mice and rats by the Trpa1) gene.

TRPA1 is an ion channel located on the plasma membrane of many human and animal cells. This ion channel is best known as a sensor for pain, cold and itch in humans and other mammals, as well as a sensor for environmental irritants giving rise to other protective responses (tears, airway resistance, and cough).

== Structure ==
In 2016, cryo-electron microscopy was employed to obtain a three-dimensional structure of TRPA1. This work revealed that the channel assembles as a homotetramer, and possesses several structural features that hint at its complex regulation by irritants, cytoplasmic second messengers (e.g., calcium), cellular co-factors (e.g., inorganic anions like polyphosphates), and lipids (e.g., PIP2). Most notably, the site of covalent modification and activation for electrophilic irritants was localized to a tertiary structural feature on the membrane-proximal intracellular face of the channel, which has been termed the 'allosteric nexus', and which is composed of a cysteine-rich linker domain and the eponymous TRP domain. Breakthrough research combining cryo-electron microscopy and electrophysiology later elucidated the molecular mechanism of how the channel functions as a broad-spectrum irritant detector. With respect to electrophiles, which activate the channel by covalent modification of two cysteines in the allosteric nexus, it was shown that these reactive oxidative species act step-wise to modify two critical cysteine residues in the allosteric nexus. Upon covalent attachment, the allosteric nexus adopts a conformational change that is propagated to the channel's pore, dilating it to permit cation influx and subsequent cellular depolarization. With respect to activation by the second messenger calcium, the structure of the channel in complex with calcium localized the binding site for this ion and functional studies demonstrated that this site controls the various different effects of calcium on the channel – namely potentiation, desensitization, and receptor-operation.

== Function ==
TRPA1 is a member of the transient receptor potential channel family. TRPA1 contains 14 N-terminal ankyrin repeats and is believed to function as a mechanical and chemical stress sensor. One of the specific functions of this protein involves a role in the detection, integration, and initiation of pain signals in the peripheral nervous system. It can be activated at sites of tissue injury or sites of inflammation directly by endogenous mediators or indirectly as a downstream target via signaling from a number of distinct G-protein coupled receptors (GPCRs), such as bradykinin.

The role of TRPA1 in pain sensing was first revealed when TRPA1 was identified as the receptor for mustard oil (allyl isothiocyanate), the pungent ingredient in mustard and wasabi. Recent studies indicate that TRPA1 is activated by a number of reactive (cinnamaldehyde, farnesyl thiosalicylic acid, formalin, hydrogen peroxide, 4-hydroxynonenal, acrolein, and tear gases) and non-reactive compounds (nicotine, PF-4840154) and is thus considered as a "chemosensor" in the body. TRPA1 is co-expressed with TRPV1 on nociceptive primary afferent C-fibers in humans. This sub-population of peripheral C-fibers are considered important sensors of nociception in humans, and their activation will under normal conditions give rise to pain. Indeed, TRPA1 is considered an attractive pain target. TRPA1 knockout mice showed near complete attenuation of nocifensive behaviors to formalin, tear-gas and other reactive chemicals . TRPA1 antagonists are effective in blocking pain behaviors induced by inflammation (complete Freund's adjuvant and formalin).

Although it is not fully confirmed whether noxious cold sensation is mediated by TRPA1 in vivo, several recent studies clearly demonstrated cold activation of TRPA1 channels in vitro.

In the heat-sensitive loreal pit organs of many snakes, TRPA1 is responsible for the detection of infrared radiation. TRPA1 also serves as an infrared detector in the antennae of beetle pollinators, enabling them to detect infrared radiation that cycad plants generate as a pollination cue.

== Clinical significance ==
In 2008, it was observed that caffeine suppresses activity of human TRPA1, but it was found that mouse TRPA1 channels expressed in sensory neurons cause an aversion to drinking caffeine-containing water, suggesting that the TRPA1 channels mediate the perception of caffeine.

TRPA1 has also been implicated in airway irritation by cigarette smoke, cleaning supplies and in the skin irritation experienced by some smokers trying to quit by using nicotine replacement therapies such as inhalers, sprays, or patches. A missense mutation of TRPA1 was found to be the cause of a hereditary episodic pain syndrome. A family from Colombia suffers from debilitating upper-body pain starting in infancy that is usually triggered by fasting or fatigue (illness, cold temperature, and physical exertion being contributory factors). A gain-of-function mutation in the fourth transmembrane domain causes the channel to be overly sensitive to pharmacological activation.

Metabolites of paracetamol (acetaminophen) have been demonstrated to bind to the TRPA1 receptors, which may desensitize the receptors in the way capsaicin does in the spinal cord of mice, causing an antinociceptive effect. This is suggested as the antinociceptive mechanism for paracetamol.

Oxalate, a metabolite of an anti cancer drug oxaliplatin, has been demonstrated to inhibit prolyl hydroxylase, which endows cold-insensitive human TRPA1 with pseudo cold sensitivity (via reactive oxygen generation from mitochondria). This may cause a characteristic side-effect of oxaliplatin (cold-triggered acute peripheral neuropathy).

== Ligands ==
=== Agonists ===
TRPA1 can be considered to be one of the most promiscuous TRP ion channels, as it seems to be activated by a large number of noxious chemicals found in many plants, food, cosmetics and pollutants.

Activation of the TRPA1 ion channel by the olive oil phenolic compound oleocanthal appears to be responsible for the pungent or "peppery" sensation in the back of the throat caused by olive oil.

Although several nonelectrophilic agents such as thymol and menthol have been reported as TRPA1 agonists, most of the known activators are electrophilic chemicals that have been shown to activate the TRPA1 receptor via the formation of a reversible covalent bond with cysteine residues present in the ion channel. Another example of a nonelectrophilic agent is the anesthetic propofol, which is known to cause pain on injection into a vein, a side effect attributed to TRPV1 and TRPA1 activation. A dibenz[b,f][1,4]oxazepine derivative substituted by a carboxylic methyl ester at position 10 has been reported to be a potent nonelectrophilic (thiol-unreactive) TRPA1 agonist (EC_{50} = 0.05 nM), while dibenzoxazepine (CR 'gas', 0.3 nM) itself, as well as several other tear gases (CN (30 nM), CS (0.9 nM), CA (10 nM) 'gases') were found to be thiol-reactive TRPA1 agonists. This study found that chemical reactivity with thiols in combination with lipophilicity enabling membrane permeation result in a potent TRPA1 agonistic effect, but thiol adduct formation is neither sufficient nor necessary for TRPA1 activation. The pyrimidine PF-4840154 is a potent, non-covalent activator of both the human (EC_{50} = 23 nM) and rat (EC_{50} = 97 nM) TRPA1 channels. This compound elicits nociception in a mouse model through TRPA1 activation. Furthermore, PF-4840154 is superior to allyl isothiocyanate, the pungent component of mustard oil, for screening purposes. Other TRPA1 channel activators include JT-010 and ASP-7663, while channel blockers include A-967079, HC-030031 and AM-0902.

The eicosanoids formed in the ALOX12 (i.e. arachidonate-12-lipoxygnease) pathway of arachidonic acid metabolism, 12S-hydroperoxy-5Z,8Z,10E,14Z-eicosatetraenoic acid (i.e. 12S-HpETE; see 12-Hydroxyeicosatetraenoic acid) and the hepoxilins (Hx), HxA3 (i.e. 8R/S-hydroxy-11,12-oxido-5Z,9E,14Z-eicosatrienoic acid) and HxB3 (i.e. 10R/S-hydroxy-11,12-oxido-5Z,8Z,14Z-eicosatrienoic acid) (see Hepoxilin#Pain perception) directly activate TRPA1 and thereby contribute to the hyperalgesia and tactile allodynia responses of mice to skin inflammation. In this animal model of pain perception, the hepoxilins are released in the spinal cord directly activate TRPA (and also TRPV1) receptors to augment the perception of pain. 12S-HpETE, which is the direct precursor to HxA3 and HxB3 in the ALOX12 pathway, may act only after being converted to these hepoxilins. The epoxide, 5,6-epoxy-8Z,11Z,14Z-eicosatrienoic acid (5,6-EET) made by the metabolism of arachidonic acid by any one of several cytochrome P450 enzymes (see Epoxyeicosatrienoic acid) likewise directly activates TRPA1 to amplify pain perception.

Studies with mice, guinea pigs, and human tissues indicate that another arachidonic acid metabolite, Prostaglandin E2, operates through its prostaglandin EP3 G protein coupled receptor to trigger cough responses. Its mechanism of action does not appear to involve direct binding to TRPA1 but rather the indirect activation and/or sensitization of TRPA1 as well as TRPV1 receptors. Genetic polymorphism in the EP3 receptor (rs11209716), has been associated with ACE inhibitor-induce cough in humans.

More recently, a peptide toxin termed the wasabi receptor toxin from the Australian black rock scorpion (Urodacus manicatus) was discovered; it was shown to bind TRPA1 non-covalently in the same region as electrophiles and act as a gating modifier toxin for the receptor, stabilizing the channel in an open conformation.

Examples of TRPA1 agonists include:

- 2-Arachidonoylglycerol
- 4-Oxo-2-nonenal
- 12S-Hydroperoxy-5Z,8Z,10E,14Z-eicosatetraenoic acid
- Allicin
- Allyl isothiocyanate
- Anandamide
- ASP-7663
- Cannabichromene
- Cannabidiol
- Cannabidiolic acid
- Cannabidivarin
- Cannabigerol
- Cannabigerolic acid
- Cannabigerovarin
- Cinnamaldehyde
- 4,5-Epoxyeicosatrienoic acid
- Gingerol
- Hepoxilins A3 and B3
- Icilin
- N-Arachidonoyl dopamine
- Palmitoylethanolamide
- PF-4840154
- Polygodial
- Propofol
- Tetrahydrocannabivarin acid
- Tetrahydrocannabivarin

=== Antagonists ===
A number of small molecule inhibitors (antagonists) have been discovered which have been shown to block the function of TRPA1. At the cellular level, assays that measure agonist-activated inhibition of TRPA1-mediated calcium fluxes and electrophysiological assays have been used to characterize the potency, species specificity and mechanism of inhibition. While the earliest inhibitors, such as HC-030031, were lower potency (micromolar inhibition) and had limited TRPA1 specificity, the more recent discovery of highly potent inhibitors with low nanomolar inhibition constants, such as A-967079 and ALGX-2542 as well as high selectivity among other members the TRP superfamily and lack of interaction with other targets have provided valuable tool compounds and candidates for future drug development.

Resolvin D1 (RvD1) and RvD2 (see resolvins) and maresin 1 are metabolites of the omega 3 fatty acid, docosahexaenoic acid. They are members of the specialized proresolving mediators (SPMs) class of metabolites that function to resolve diverse inflammatory reactions and diseases in animal models and, it is proposed, in humans. These SPMs also damp pain perception arising from various inflammation-based causes in animal models. The mechanism behind their pain-dampening effect involves the inhibition of TRPA1, probably (in at least certain cases) by an indirect effect wherein they activate another receptor located on neurons or nearby microglia or astrocytes. CMKLR1, GPR32, FPR2, and NMDA receptors have been proposed to be the receptors through which SPMs may operate to down-regulate TRPs and thereby pain perception.

Examples of antagonists include:

- A-967079
- ALGX-2513
- ALGX-2541
- ALGX-2542
- ALGX-2561
- ALGX-2563
- GRC17536
- HC-030031

=== Gating modifiers ===
- WaTx
