= Capsazepine =

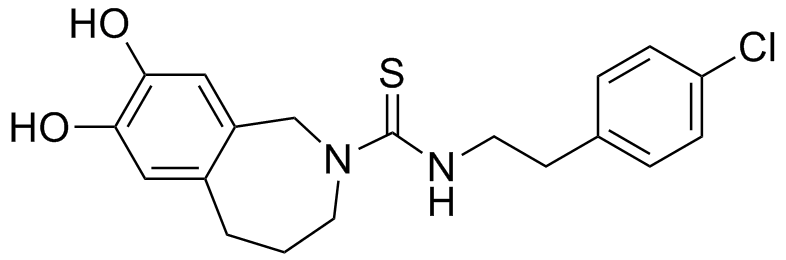

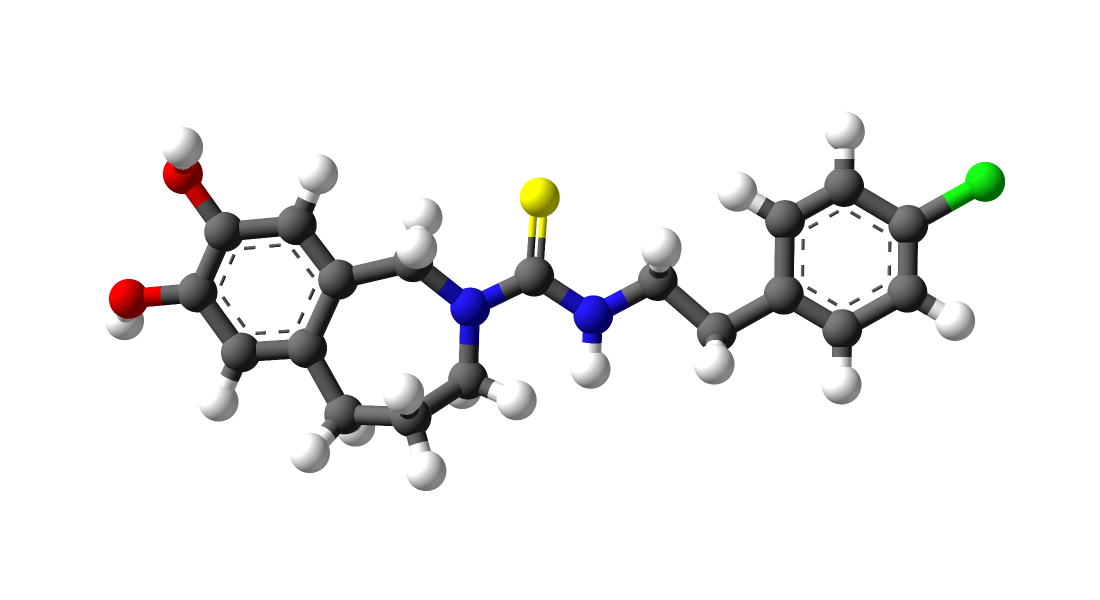

Names
- Preferred IUPAC name N-[2-(4-Chlorophenyl)ethyl]-7,8-dihydroxy-1,3,4,5-tetrahydro-2H-2-benzazepine-2-carbothioamide
- Other names: N-(4-Chlorophenethyl)-7,8-dihydroxy-1,3,4,5-tetrahydro-2H-benzo[c]azepine-2-carbothioamide; N-(4-Chlorophenethyl)-7,8-dihydroxy-4,5-dihydro-1H-benzo[c]azepine-2(3H)-carbothioamide

Identifiers
CAS Number	138977-28-3
3D model (JSmol)	Interactive image
ChEMBL	ChEMBL391997
ChemSpider	2015280
IUPHAR/BPS	2461
PubChem CID	2733484
UNII	LFW48MY844
CompTox Dashboard (EPA)	DTXSID20160852
- InChI: InChI=1S/C19H21ClN2O2S/c20-16-5-3-13(4-6-16)7-8-21-19(25)22-9-1-2-14-10-17(23)18(24)11-15(14)12-22/h3-6,10-11,23-24H,1-2,7-9,12H2,(H,21,25) Key: DRCMAZOSEIMCHM-UHFFFAOYSA-N; InChI=1/C19H21ClN2O2S/c20-16-5-3-13(4-6-16)7-8-21-19(25)22-9-1-2-14-10-17(23)18(24)11-15(14)12-22/h3-6,10-11,23-24H,1-2,7-9,12H2,(H,21,25) Key: DRCMAZOSEIMCHM-UHFFFAOYAH
- SMILES: Clc1ccc(cc1)CCNC(=S)N3Cc2c(cc(O)c(O)c2)CCC3

Properties
Chemical formula	C_{19}H_{21}ClN_{2}O_{2}S
Molar mass	376.9 g/mol
- Except where otherwise noted, data are given for materials in their standard state (at 25 °C [77 °F], 100 kPa). verify (what is ?) Infobox references

Capsazepine is a synthetic antagonist of capsaicin. It is used as a biochemical tool in the study of TRPV ion channels.

== Pharmacology ==
Capsazepine blocks the painful sensation of heat caused by capsaicin (the active ingredient of chilli pepper) which activates the TRPV1 ion channel. Capsazepine is therefore considered to be a TRPV1 antagonist. The TRPV1 channel functions as a pain and temperature sensor in mammalians. Capsazepine blocks the activation of TRPV1 channels by other chemicals, but not by other painful stimuli such as heat. Depending on the pharmacological assay, the IC_{50} is in the nanomolar to low micromolar range. In addition to its effects on TRPV1 channels, it was also shown to activate the noxious chemical sensor TRPA1 channel, inhibit the cold activated TRPM8 channel, voltage-activated calcium channels and nicotinic acetylcholine receptors. It mainly serves as a tool to study the TRPV1 ion channel.

== Development ==
Capsazepine was discovered by a research group working for Novartis. Its synthesis and chemical properties were published in 1994. It was found by modification of the chemical backbone of capsaicin.

== Use in biotechnology ==
By incorporation of an azobenzene unit, a photoswitchable version of capsazepine (AC4) was developed in 2013 that allows for optical control of TRPV1 channels with light.

== See also ==
- Discovery and development of TRPV1 antagonists
- Menthol
- Herkinorin
- JWH-133
