= XEN-D0501 =

Clinical data
- Other names: BAY-69-9426

Legal status
- Legal status: Investigational

Identifiers
- CAS Number: 1400591-98-1
- DrugBank: DB18673

XEN-D0501 is an experimental transient receptor potential vanilloid 1 (TRPV1) antagonist. It was acquired by Pila Pharma from Ario Pharma in 2016.
