= ASP-7663 =

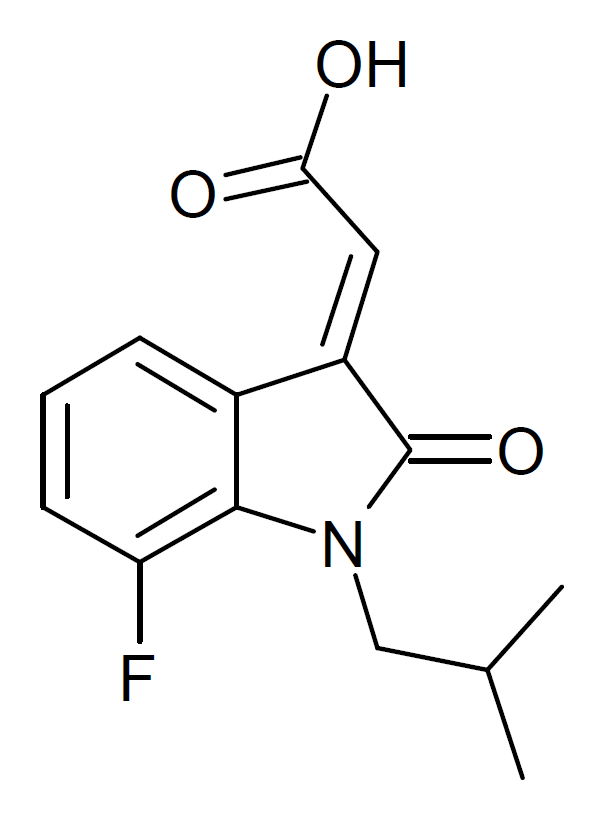

Names
- Preferred IUPAC name (E)-[7-Fluoro-1-(2-methylpropyl)-2-oxo-1,2-dihydro-3H-indol-3-ylidene]acetic acid

Identifiers
CAS Number	1190217-35-6
3D model (JSmol)	Interactive image
ChEMBL	ChEMBL1082283
ChemSpider	24676635
PubChem CID	44232532
CompTox Dashboard (EPA)	DTXSID401336557
- InChI: InChI=1S/C14H14FNO3/c1-8(2)7-16-13-9(4-3-5-11(13)15)10(14(16)19)6-12(17)18/h3-6,8H,7H2,1-2H3,(H,17,18)/b10-6+ Key: RCVZUIGCNAAMIC-UXBLZVDNSA-N
- SMILES: CC(C)CN1C2=C(C=CC=C2F)/C(=C\C(=O)O)/C1=O

Properties
Chemical formula	C_{14}H_{14}FNO_{3}
Molar mass	263.268 g·mol^{−1}
- Except where otherwise noted, data are given for materials in their standard state (at 25 °C [77 °F], 100 kPa). Infobox references

ASP-7663 is a chemical compound which acts as a potent, selective activator of the TRPA1 channel. It has protective effects on cardiac tissue, and is used for research into the function of the TRPA1 receptor.

== See also ==
- JT-010
- PF-4840154
