= GRC-6211 =

Chemical compound

Identifiers
- IUPAC name: 1-[(4R)-6-fluorospiro[3,4-dihydrochromene-2,1'-cyclobutane]-4-yl]-3-isoquinolin-5-ylurea
- CAS Number: 1166398-35-1
- PubChem CID: 138393987
- ChemSpider: 81367687
- UNII: 4S841S9BO9

Chemical and physical data
- Formula: C_{22}H_{20}FN_{3}O_{2}
- Molar mass: 377.419 g·mol^{−1}
- 3D model (JSmol): Interactive image
- SMILES: C1CC2(C1)C[C@H](C3=C(O2)C=CC(=C3)F)NC(=O)NC4=CC=CC5=C4C=CN=C5
- InChI: InChI=1S/C22H20FN3O2/c23-15-5-6-20-17(11-15)19(12-22(28-20)8-2-9-22)26-21(27)25-18-4-1-3-14-13-24-10-7-16(14)18/h1,3-7,10-11,13,19H,2,8-9,12H2,(H2,25,26,27)/t19-/m1/s1; Key:JADKHWDNSKIILG-LJQANCHMSA-N

GRC-6211 is a drug developed by Glenmark Pharmaceuticals which acts as a potent and selective antagonist for the TRPV1 receptor. It has analgesic and antiinflammatory effects and reached Phase IIb human trials, but was ultimately discontinued from development as a medicine, though it continues to have applications in scientific research.
