= A-967079 =

Chemical compound

Identifiers
- IUPAC name: (1E,3E)-1-(4-fluorophenyl)-2-methyl-1-penten-3-one oxime
- CAS Number: 1170613-55-4
- PubChem CID: 60150207
- ChemSpider: 28294676
- UNII: S15N98QQ2K
- ChEMBL: ChEMBL3697710

Chemical and physical data
- Formula: C_{12}H_{14}FNO
- Molar mass: 207.248 g·mol^{−1}
- 3D model (JSmol): Interactive image
- SMILES: CC/C(=N/O)/C(=C/C1=CC=C(C=C1)F)/C
- InChI: InChI=1S/C12H14FNO/c1-3-12(14-15)9(2)8-10-4-6-11(13)7-5-10/h4-8,15H,3H2,1-2H3/b9-8+,14-12-; Key:HKROEBDHHKMNBZ-BYKJOZEVSA-N

A-967079 is a drug which acts as a potent and selective antagonist for the TRPA1 receptor. It has analgesic and antiinflammatory effects and is used in scientific research, but has not been developed for medical use.
