= SB-705498 =

Chemical compound

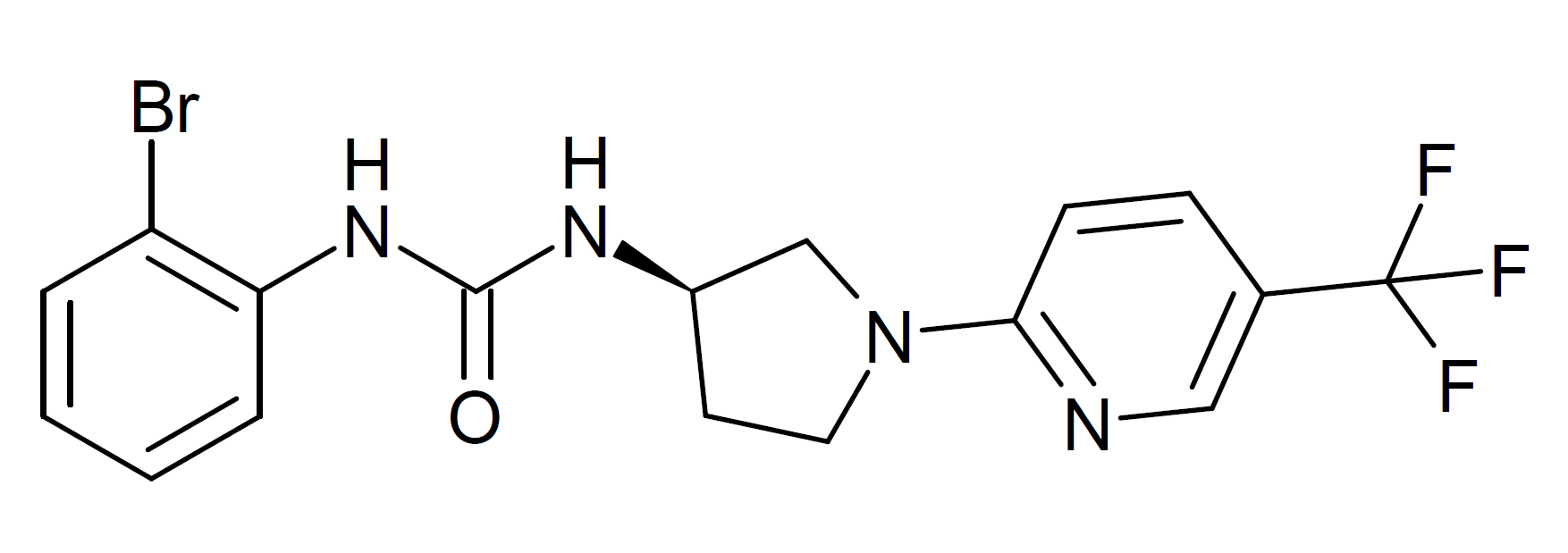

Identifiers
- IUPAC name: 1-(2-bromophenyl)-3-[(3R)-1-[5-(trifluoromethyl)pyridin-2-yl]pyrrolidin-3-yl]urea
- CAS Number: 501951-42-4
- PubChem CID: 9910486
- DrugBank: DB11883
- ChemSpider: 8086137
- UNII: T74V9O0Y2W
- ChEMBL: ChEMBL207433
- CompTox Dashboard (EPA): DTXSID20198236

Chemical and physical data
- Formula: C_{17}H_{16}BrF_{3}N_{4}O
- Molar mass: 429.241 g·mol^{−1}
- 3D model (JSmol): Interactive image
- SMILES: C1CN(C[C@@H]1NC(=O)NC2=CC=CC=C2Br)C3=NC=C(C=C3)C(F)(F)F
- InChI: InChI=1S/C17H16BrF3N4O/c18-13-3-1-2-4-14(13)24-16(26)23-12-7-8-25(10-12)15-6-5-11(9-22-15)17(19,20)21/h1-6,9,12H,7-8,10H2,(H2,23,24,26)/t12-/m1/s1; Key:JYILLRHXRVTRSH-GFCCVEGCSA-N

SB-705498 is a drug which acts as a potent and selective blocker of the TRPV1 ion channel. It has been evaluated in clinical trials for the treatment of rhinitis and chronic cough.

== See also ==
- AMG-517
- AMG-9810
- Discovery and development of TRPV1 antagonists
