= JT-010 =

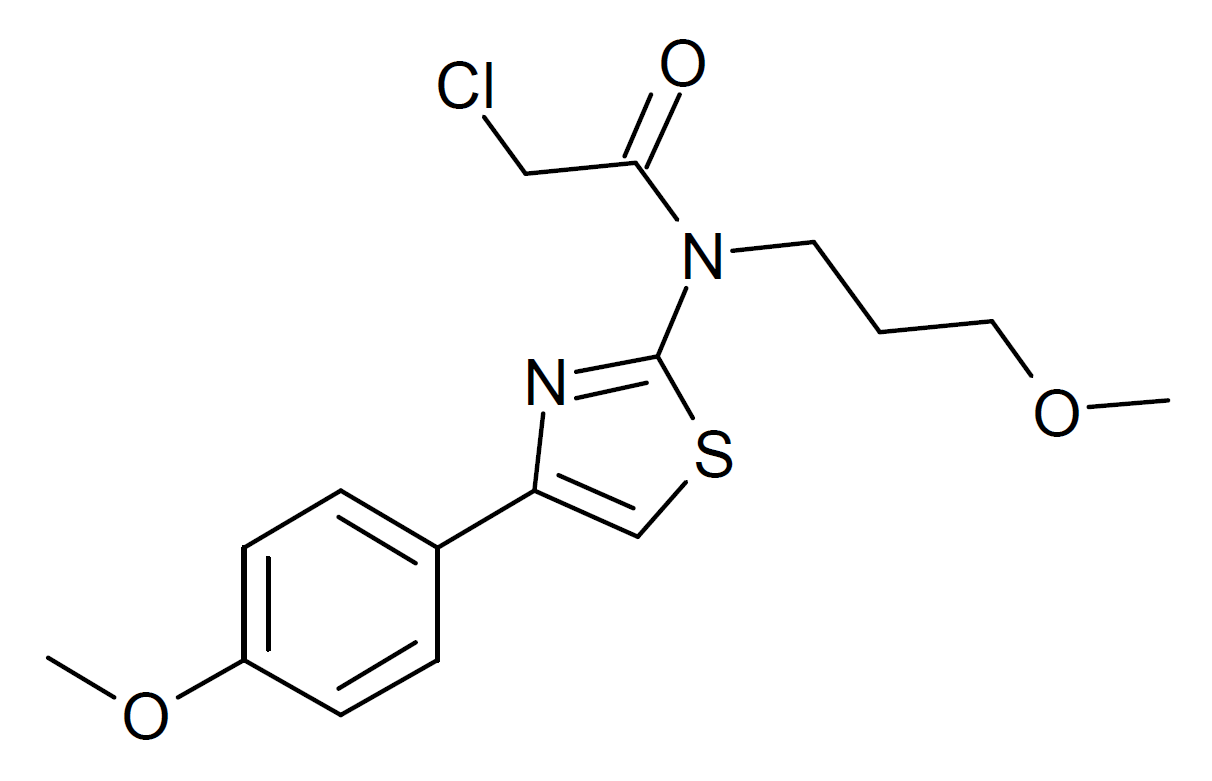

Names
- Preferred IUPAC name 2-Chloro-N-[4-(4-methoxyphenyl)-1,3-thiazol-2-yl]-N-(3-methoxypropyl)acetamide

Identifiers
CAS Number	917562-33-5
3D model (JSmol)	Interactive image
ChemSpider	17834320
PubChem CID	18524489
CompTox Dashboard (EPA)	DTXSID401336571
- InChI: InChI=1S/C16H19ClN2O3S/c1-21-9-3-8-19(15(20)10-17)16-18-14(11-23-16)12-4-6-13(22-2)7-5-12/h4-7,11H,3,8-10H2,1-2H3 Key: KZMAWJRXKGLWGS-UHFFFAOYSA-N
- SMILES: O=C(N(C1=NC(C2=CC=C(OC)C=C2)=CS1)CCCOC)CCl

Properties
Chemical formula	C_{16}H_{19}ClN_{2}O_{3}S
Molar mass	354.85 g·mol^{−1}
- Except where otherwise noted, data are given for materials in their standard state (at 25 °C [77 °F], 100 kPa). Infobox references

JT-010 is a chemical compound which acts as a potent, selective activator of the TRPA1 channel, and has been used to study the role of this receptor in the perception of pain, as well as other actions such as promoting repair of dental tissue after damage.

== See also ==
- ASP-7663
- PF-4840154
