= Motugivatrep =

Clinical data
- Trade names: Avarept
- Other names: SJP-0132; DA-55647; HY-145582; CS-0376446; D12841

Legal status
- Legal status: Rx in Japan

Identifiers
- IUPAC name: (2E)-N-[(7R)-7-Hydroxy-5,6,7,8-tetrahydronaphthalen-1-yl]-2-[7-(trifluoromethyl)-2,3-dihydrochromen-4-ylidene]acetamide
- CAS Number: 920332-28-1
- PubChem CID: 137350798
- ChemSpider: 128921697
- UNII: 7SHP2FH6HQ
- KEGG: D12841
- ChEMBL: ChEMBL5095073

Chemical and physical data
- Formula: C_{22}H_{20}F_{3}NO_{3}
- Molar mass: 403.401 g·mol^{−1}
- 3D model (JSmol): Interactive image
- SMILES: C1CC2=C(C[C@@H]1O)C(=CC=C2)NC(=O)/C=C/3\CCOC4=C3C=CC(=C4)C(F)(F)F
- InChI: InChI=1S/C22H20F3NO3/c23-22(24,25)15-5-7-17-14(8-9-29-20(17)11-15)10-21(28)26-19-3-1-2-13-4-6-16(27)12-18(13)19/h1-3,5,7,10-11,16,27H,4,6,8-9,12H2,(H,26,28)/b14-10+/t16-/m1/s1; Key:MAWBBYZCTDJMDD-HFQYIWAZSA-N

Motugivatrep (brand name Avarept) is an ophthalmic drug. In Japan, it is approved to treat dry eye disease.

It acts as a transient receptor potential cation channel subfamily V member 1 (TRPV1) antagonist.
