= Wasabi receptor toxin =

Active component of the Australian black rock scorpion's venom

Wasabi Receptor Toxin
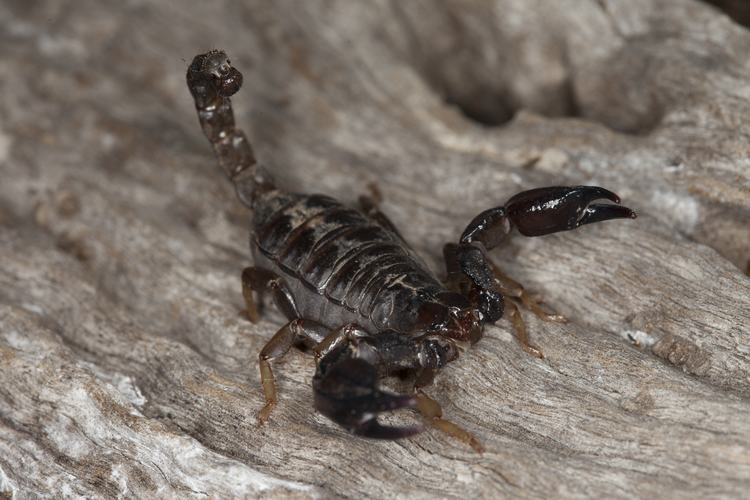
- Australian black rock scorpion (Urodacus manicatus)

Identifiers
- Organism: Urodacus manicatus
- Symbol: WaTx
- Orthologs: OMA: entry
- PDB: 6OFA
- UniProt: C0HLG4
Search for
- Structures: Swiss-model
- Domains: InterPro

Wasabi receptor toxin (WaTx) is the active component of the venom of the Australian black rock scorpion Urodacus manicatus. WaTx targets TRPA1, also known as the wasabi receptor or irritant receptor. WaTx is a cell-penetrating toxin that stabilizes the TRPA1 channel open state while reducing its Ca^{2+}-permeability, thereby eliciting pain and pain hypersensitivity without the neurogenic inflammation that typically occurs in other animal toxins.

== Etymology ==
This scorpion toxin was named WaTx because it targets TRPA1 in a similar fashion as plant-derived irritants, such as mustard oil and wasabi. These irritants activate the TRPA1 channel in peripheral primary afferent sensory neurons, subsequently eliciting their pungent taste as well as sinus clearing and eye stinging.

== Sources ==
WaTx originates from the venom of the Australian Black Rock Scorpion (Urodacus manicatus).

== Chemistry ==
=== Family ===
WaTx belongs to the κ-KTx family, as it shows similarities in the disulfide bonding pattern. The KTx family is classified into four subfamilies: α-, β-, γ-, and κ-KTx. Unlike other KTx subfamilies, κ-KTx scorpion toxins form cysteine-stabilized α-helical hairpins (Cs α/α), whereas κ-KTx spider and crab toxins form cysteine-stabilized antiparallel β-sheets (Cs β/β).

UniProt's curated classification states: "short scorpion toxin superfamily, potassium channel inhibitor kappa-KTx family, kappa-KTx 1 subfamily".

=== Structure ===
WaTx is a macromolecule with an estimated weight of 3.86 kDa, which consists of 33 amino-acid residues. Its amino-acid sequence is as follows:

1       9  13        23  27    33
            ┌─────────┐
ASPQQAKYCYEQCNVNKVPFDQCYQMCSPLERS
        └─────────────────┘

The pattern of cysteine residues in the amino acid sequence, which is underlined above, indicates an independent Cys9-Cys27, Cys13-Cys23 disulfide bonding pattern. The two disulfide bridges connect two parallel α-helices with a β-turn. The disulfide bonding pattern stabilizes the rigid and compact helical hairpin structure at two points, contributing to the stable tertiary structure of the protein.

The hairpin contains four basic residues that enable passive diffusion across the membrane. Two features of the protein structure have been associated with cell-penetrating properties that are uncommon for peptide toxins. Firstly, a patch (or predominance) of basic residues is located at the open end of the hairpin, where the amino- and carboxy-terminal meet. Secondly, the amino-terminal in WaTx exhibits a dense dipole moment. Other proteins with the ability to penetrate the plasma membrane include HIV Tat and Drosophila penetratin. However, these proteins have no sequence resemblance to WaTx.

=== Homology ===
The amino-acid sequence of WaTx bears little resemblance to other peptides in terms of homology. Nevertheless, its structure places it in the κ-KTx family.

Although the toxin was discovered to be cell-penetrating, there is no sequence similarity to classical cell-penetrating peptides (CPPs).

== Target ==
WaTx targets TRPA1, one of about 30 transient receptor potential channels. WaTx is both potent and selective for TRPA1. Other known TRP-channels are not activated by the toxin. WaTx has an effect on human TRPA1 (hTRPA1), while it does not have an effect on to rat and snake TRPA1 (rsTRPA1).

== Mode of action ==
WaTx penetrates the plasma membrane instead of following standard routes, subsequently accessing the interior of the cell. The basic residues and dipole moment on the helical hairpin structure enable the passive diffusion of WaTx.

Once the toxin arrives in the cell, it activates TRPA1 via an intracellular domain in the lower part of voltage-sensing segments S1-S4 called 'the allosteric nexus'. The allosteric nexus is located at the region where the TRP-like domain, pre-S1 helix and cysteine-rich S4-S5 linker meet. This inner cavity is a common binding site to reactive electrophilic ligands—and now WaTx. This locus is a key regulatory site for stimulus integration and propagates conformational changes to the channel's gate. When activated, the open-state TRPA1 allows the flow of positively charged sodium and calcium ions into the cell.

Electrophilic ligands make covalent modifications to specific cysteine residues in the cytoplasmic amino-terminus that increase the probability of channel opening. Although both Na^{+} and Ca^{2+} can enter TRPA1, the channel normally has a preference towards Ca^{2+} and the intracellular calcium concentration increases more rapidly than the sodium concentration. WaTx interacts differently with the channel compared to reactive electrophiles. WaTx non-covalently binds to the allosteric nexus and initiates interactions with an integrated complex between the N-terminal cysteine-rich linker (S4-S5) and C-terminal TRP-like domains. This prevents the open channel from closing, as opposed to increasing the probability of opening, and results in a prolonged duration of the channel's open state. With WaTx bound in open state, TRPA1 lacks a preference for Ca^{2+} over Na^{+}, which accounts for the lower calcium permeability. Consequently, both electrophilic ligands and WaTx trigger a pain response, but the calcium levels that result from WaTx are too low to initiate subsequent neuropeptide release and neurogenic inflammation. This suggests that WaTx may act only to open the ion permeation gate of TRPA1, without dilating the selectivity filter (dilation of the selectivity filter having been proposed to underlie enhanced calcium permeability of TRPA1 after activation by classical electrophilic irritants).

== Toxicity ==
WaTx elicits acute thermal and mechanical hypersensitivity. This response has been proven phenotypically by injecting WaTx in the hind paw of mice, which leads to dose-dependent nocifensive behavior. However, WaTx does not cause the local edema that is typical for noxious electrophiles. This lack of swelling indicates that WaTx fails to promote the release of calcitonin gene-related peptide (CGRP)—a hallmark of neurogenic inflammation.

== Treatment ==
There is no immediate danger after being stung by an Australian Black Rock Scorpion. The wound should be washed and cleaned, after which medical advice should be sought.

== Therapeutic use ==
So far, there are no pharmacologicals based on (the mode of action of) WaTx. However, understanding the mechanisms of WaTx's interaction with TRPA1 may aid in the development of therapeutics targeting TRPA1, which is considered a promising target for treating pain, itch and neurogenic inflammation syndromes that involve nociception.
