= PF-4840154 =

Pyrimidine derivative chemical

Names
- Preferred IUPAC name N-Benzyl-4-[(2-methylpropyl)amino]-2-{4-[(oxan-3-yl)methyl]piperazin-1-yl}pyrimidine-5-carboxamide

Identifiers
CAS Number	1332708-14-1
3D model (JSmol)	Interactive image
ChEMBL	ChEMBL1818218
ChemSpider	26610754
IUPHAR/BPS	6309
PubChem CID	53380803
UNII	BR82CU5AC9
CompTox Dashboard (EPA)	DTXSID001029756
- InChI: InChI=1S/C26H38N6O2/c1-20(2)15-27-24-23(25(33)28-16-21-7-4-3-5-8-21)17-29-26(30-24)32-12-10-31(11-13-32)18-22-9-6-14-34-19-22/h3-5,7-8,17,20,22H,6,9-16,18-19H2,1-2H3,(H,28,33)(H,27,29,30) Key: PPANZCQXFYBGHN-UHFFFAOYSA-N
- SMILES: O=C(NCC1=CC=CC=C1)C(C=N2)=C(NCC(C)C)N=C2N(CC3)CCN3CC4CCCOC4

Properties
Chemical formula	C_{26}H_{38}N_{6}O_{2}
Molar mass	466.630 g·mol^{−1}
- Except where otherwise noted, data are given for materials in their standard state (at 25 °C [77 °F], 100 kPa). verify (what is ?) Infobox references

PF-4840154 is a pyrimidine derivative discovered by Pfizer at its Sandwich, Kent research center. The compound is a potent, selective activator of both the human (EC_{50} = 23 nM) and rat (EC_{50} = 97 nM) TRPA1 channels. This compound elicits nociception in a mouse model through TRPA1 activation. PF-4840154 is used as a reference agonist of the TRPA1 channel for in-vitro high-throughput screening purposes, and is superior to allyl isothiocyanate for this use. The TRPA1 channel is considered an attractive pain target based on the fact that TRPA1 knockout mice showed near complete attenuation of pain behaviors in some pre-clinical development models.

== See also ==
- ASP-7663
- JT-010
