= AM-0902 =

Chemical compound

Identifiers
- IUPAC name: 1-({3-[2-(4-chlorophenyl)ethyl]-1,2,4-oxadiazol-5-yl}methyl)-7-methylpurin-6-one
- CAS Number: 1883711-97-4
- PubChem CID: 73297271
- ChemSpider: 58864849
- UNII: 3E4SQ96PCJ
- ChEMBL: ChEMBL3785736

Chemical and physical data
- Formula: C_{17}H_{15}ClN_{6}O_{2}
- Molar mass: 370.80 g·mol^{−1}
- 3D model (JSmol): Interactive image
- SMILES: CN1C=NC2=C1C(=O)N(C=N2)CC3=NC(=NO3)CCC4=CC=C(C=C4)Cl
- InChI: InChI=1S/C17H15ClN6O2/c1-23-9-19-16-15(23)17(25)24(10-20-16)8-14-21-13(22-26-14)7-4-11-2-5-12(18)6-3-11/h2-3,5-6,9-10H,4,7-8H2,1H3; Key:AWJBWNUUODWOKQ-UHFFFAOYSA-N

AM-0902 is a drug which acts as a potent and selective antagonist for the TRPA1 receptor, and has analgesic and antiinflammatory effects.
