= HC-030031 =

Chemical compound

Identifiers
- IUPAC name: 2-(1,3-dimethyl-2,6-dioxopurin-7-yl)-N-(4-propan-2-ylphenyl)acetamide
- CAS Number: 349085-38-7
- PubChem CID: 1150897
- ChemSpider: 976407
- UNII: MU78VFH9C7
- ChEMBL: ChEMBL1086310
- CompTox Dashboard (EPA): DTXSID10360763
- ECHA InfoCard: 100.159.785

Chemical and physical data
- Formula: C_{18}H_{21}N_{5}O_{3}
- Molar mass: 355.398 g·mol^{−1}
- 3D model (JSmol): Interactive image
- SMILES: CC(C)C1=CC=C(C=C1)NC(=O)CN2C=NC3=C2C(=O)N(C(=O)N3C)C
- InChI: InChI=1S/C18H21N5O3/c1-11(2)12-5-7-13(8-6-12)20-14(24)9-23-10-19-16-15(23)17(25)22(4)18(26)21(16)3/h5-8,10-11H,9H2,1-4H3,(H,20,24); Key:HEQDZPHDVAOBLN-UHFFFAOYSA-N

HC-030031 is a drug which acts as a potent and selective antagonist for the TRPA1 receptor, and has analgesic and antiinflammatory effects.
