= TRPV1 =

Human protein for regulating body temperature

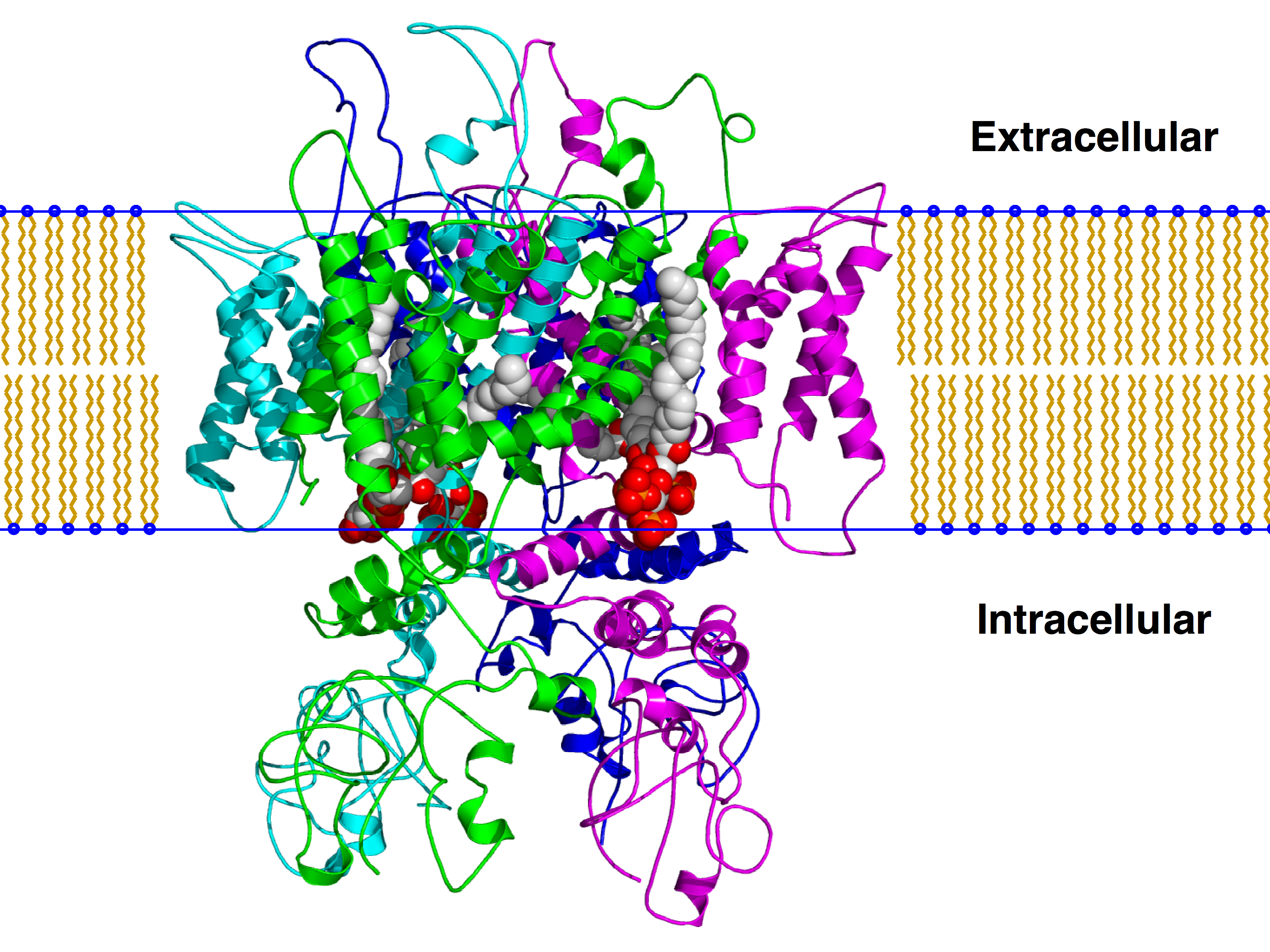

Identifiers
- Aliases: TRPV1, VR1, transient receptor potential cation channel subfamily V member 1
- External IDs: OMIM: 602076; MGI: 1341787; GeneCards: TRPV1

Gene location (Human)
Chr.	Chromosome 17 (human)
Band	17p13.2	Start	3,565,444 bp
Band	17p13.2	End	3,609,411 bp

Gene location (Mouse)
Chr.	Chromosome 11 (mouse)
Band	11 B4|11 45.25 cM	Start	73,125,118 bp
Band	11 B4|11 45.25 cM	End	73,152,068 bp
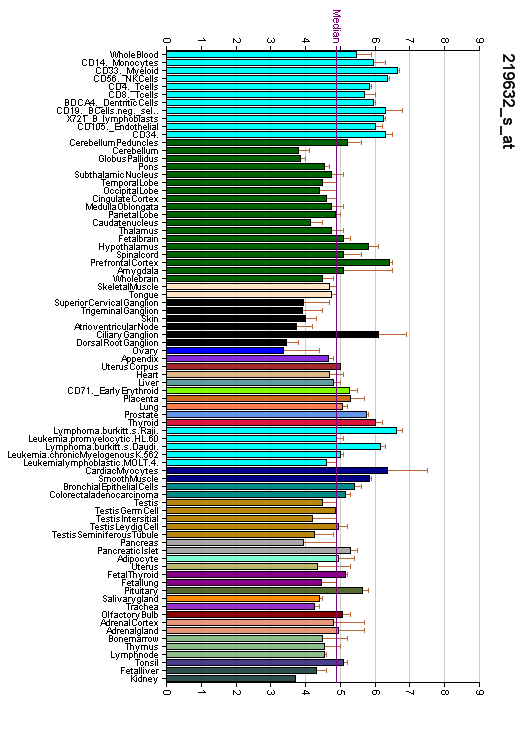
RNA expression pattern
Bgee	Human / Mouse (ortholog); Top expressed in: right lobe of liver; sural nerve; apex of heart; cerebellar hemisphere; right hemisphere of cerebellum; right uterine tube; gonad; left ovary; right ovary; canal of the cervix / Top expressed in: lumbar spinal ganglion; trigeminal ganglion; morula; glossopharyngeal ganglion; blastocyst; embryo; spermatocyte; white adipose tissue; esophagus; lip; More reference expression data
BioGPS	More reference expression data
Gene ontology
Molecular function	nucleotide binding; ion channel activity; phosphoprotein binding; ATP binding; cation transmembrane transporter activity; cation channel activity; ligand-gated ion channel activity; calcium-release channel activity; temperature-gated ion channel activity; identical protein binding; chloride channel regulator activity; transmembrane signaling receptor activity; excitatory extracellular ligand-gated ion channel activity; calcium channel activity; extracellular ligand-gated ion channel activity; phosphatidylinositol binding; metal ion binding; calmodulin binding; protein binding
Cellular component	integral component of membrane; postsynaptic membrane; cell projection; membrane; plasma membrane; synapse; cell junction; dendritic spine membrane; cytosol; soma; intrinsic component of plasma membrane; dendrite; external side of plasma membrane; neuron projection; integral component of plasma membrane; mitochondrion
Biological process	ion transport; chemosensory behavior; cell surface receptor signaling pathway; calcium ion transmembrane transport; thermoception; calcium ion transport; inflammatory response; transmembrane transport; release of sequestered calcium ion into cytosol; negative regulation of transcription by RNA polymerase II; diet induced thermogenesis; detection of chemical stimulus involved in sensory perception of pain; microglial cell activation; cellular response to growth factor stimulus; positive regulation of gastric acid secretion; response to peptide hormone; cellular response to nerve growth factor stimulus; positive regulation of nitric oxide biosynthetic process; negative regulation of establishment of blood-brain barrier; lipid metabolism; temperature homeostasis; response to heat; cellular response to temperature stimulus; positive regulation of cytosolic calcium ion concentration; peptide secretion; detection of temperature stimulus involved in sensory perception of pain; sensory perception of mechanical stimulus; smooth muscle contraction involved in micturition; behavioral response to pain; response to pain; cellular response to alkaloid; cellular response to cytokine stimulus; fever generation; detection of temperature stimulus involved in thermoception; positive regulation of apoptotic process; urinary bladder smooth muscle contraction; glutamate secretion; sensory perception of pain; cellular response to tumor necrosis factor; cellular response to ATP; ion transmembrane transport; response to pH; response to organonitrogen compound; cellular response to heat; protein homotetramerization; excitatory postsynaptic potential; cellular response to acidic pH; response to capsazepine; calcium ion import across plasma membrane; negative regulation of systemic arterial blood pressure; negative regulation of heart rate; negative regulation of mitochondrial membrane potential
Sources:Amigo / QuickGO
Orthologs
Databases	NCBI: entry; OMA: entry
Species	Human	Mouse
Entrez	7442	193034
Ensembl	ENSG00000196689	ENSMUSG00000005952
UniProt	Q8NER1	Q704Y3
RefSeq (mRNA)	NM_018727; NM_080704; NM_080705; NM_080706	NM_001001445
RefSeq (protein)	NP_061197; NP_542435; NP_542436; NP_542437	NP_001001445
Location (UCSC)	Chr 17: 3.57 – 3.61 Mb	Chr 11: 73.13 – 73.15 Mb
PubMed search
- Wikidata
View/Edit Human	View/Edit Mouse

The transient receptor potential cation channel subfamily V member 1 (TRPV1), also known as the capsaicin receptor and the vanilloid receptor 1, is a protein that, in humans, is encoded by the TRPV1 gene. It was the first isolated member of the transient receptor potential vanilloid receptor proteins that in turn are a sub-family of the transient receptor potential protein group. This protein is a member of the TRPV group of transient receptor potential family of ion channels. The function of TRPV1 is detection and regulation of body temperature. In addition, TRPV1 provides a sensation of scalding heat and pain (nociception). In primary afferent sensory neurons, it cooperates with TRPA1 (a chemical irritant receptor) to mediate the detection of noxious environmental stimuli.

== Function ==
TRPV1 is an element of or mechanism used by the mammalian somatosensory system. It is a nonselective cation channel that may be activated by a wide variety of exogenous and endogenous physical and chemical stimuli. The best-known activators of TRPV1 are temperature greater than 43 °C (109 °F), acidic conditions, capsaicin (the irritating compound in hot chilis), and allyl isothiocyanate (the pungent compound in mustard and wasabi). The activation of TRPV1 leads to a painful, burning sensation. Its endogenous activators include low pH (acidic conditions), the endocannabinoid anandamide, N-oleyl-dopamine, and N-arachidonoyl dopamine. TRPV1 receptors are found mainly in the nociceptive neurons of the peripheral nervous system, but they have also been described in many other tissues, including the central nervous system. TRPV1 is involved in the transmission and modulation of pain (nociception), as well as the integration of diverse painful stimuli.

=== Sensitization ===
The sensitivity of TRPV1 to noxious stimuli, such as high temperatures, is not static. Upon tissue damage and the consequent inflammation, a number of inflammatory mediators, such as various prostaglandins and bradykinin, are released. These agents increase the sensitivity of nociceptors to noxious stimuli. This manifests as an increased sensitivity to painful stimuli (hyperalgesia) or pain sensation in response to non-painful stimuli (allodynia). Most sensitizing pro-inflammatory agents activate the phospholipase C pathway. Phosphorylation of TRPV1 by protein kinase C has been shown to play a role in sensitization of TRPV1. The cleavage of PIP_{2} by PLC-beta can result in disinhibition of TRPV1 and, as a consequence, contribute to the sensitivity of TRPV1 to noxious stimuli.

=== Desensitization ===
Upon prolonged exposure to capsaicin, TRPV1 activity decreases, a phenomenon called desensitization. Extracellular calcium ions are required for this phenomenon, thus influx of calcium and the consequential increase of intracellular calcium mediate this effect. Various signaling pathways such as phosphorylation by PKA and PKC, interaction with calmodulin, dephosphorylation by calcineurin, and the decrease of PIP_{2}, have been implicated in the regulation of desensitization of TRPV1. Desensitization of TRPV1 is thought to underlie the paradoxical analgesic effect of capsaicin.

== Clinical significance ==
=== Peripheral nervous system ===
As a result of its involvement in nociception, TRPV1 has been a target for the development of pain reducers (analgesics). Three major strategies have been used:

=== TRPV1 use ===
The TRPV1 receptor can be used to measure how an organism can sense temperature change. In the lab the receptor may be removed from mice giving them the inability to detect differences in ambient temperature. In the pharmaceutical field this allows for the blocking of heat receptors giving patients with inflammatory disorders or severe burning pains a chance to heal without the pain. The lack of the TRPV1 receptor gives a glimpse into the developing brain as heat can kill most organisms in large enough doses, so this removal process shows researchers how the inability to sense heat may be detrimental to the survivability of an organism and then translate this to human heat disorders.

=== TRPV1 in immune cells ===
TRPV1 plays an important role not only in neurones but also in immune cells. Activation of TRPV1 modulates immune response including the release of inflammatory cytokines, chemokines, and the ability to phagocytose. However, the role of TRPV1 in immune cells is not entirely understood and it is currently intensely studied. TRPV1 is not the only TRP channel expressed in immune cells. TRPA1, TRPM8 and TRPV4 are the most relevant TRP channels that are also studied in immune cells.

The expression of TRPV1 was confirmed in the cells of innate immunity as well as the cells of adaptive immunity. TRPV1 can be found in monocytes, macrophages, dendritic cells, T lymphocytes, natural killer cells and neutrophiles. TRPV1 is said to be potentially very important in immune cell functioning as it senses higher temperature and lower pH, which can affect the immune cell performance.

==== TRPV1 and adaptive immunity ====
TRPV1 is an important membrane channel in T cells as it regulates the influx of calcium cations. TRPV1's involvement is mainly in T cell receptor (TCR) signalling, T cell activation and TCR-mediated influx of calcium ions, but it is involved in T cell cytokine production as well. Indeed, T cells with TRPV1 knockout show impaired calcium uptake after T cell activation via TCR, thus they show dysregulation in signalling pathways such as NF-κB and NFAT.

==== TRPV1 and innate immunity ====
Regarding innate immunity, activation of TRPV1 by capsaicin has been shown to suppress the production of nitrite radical, superoxide anion and hydrogen peroxide by macrophages. Furthermore, administration of capsaicin, and subsequent activation of TRPV1, suppresses phagocytosis in dendritic cells. In a mouse model, TRPV1 affect dendritic cell maturation and function, however, further studies are needed to clarify this effect in humans. In neutrophils, the increase in cytosolic calcium cations leads to synthesis of prostaglandins. Activation of TRPV1 by capsaicin modulates neutrophil immune response due to the higher influx of calcium ions into the cell.

TRPV1 is also considered a novel therapeutic agent in many inflammatory diseases. Multiple studies have proven that TRPV1 influences the outcome of several inflammatory diseases such as chronic asthma, esophageal inflammation, rheumatoid arthritis and cancer. Studies using TRPV1's agonists and antagonists have shown that their administration indeed changes the course of inflammation. However, at this point, there is a lot of contradictive evidence about what type of response, pro-inflammatory or anti-inflammatory, TRPV1's activation induces. Further research needs to be carried out. Meanwhile, it is important to highlight that TRPV1's influence on inflammatory diseases is probably not limited to only immune cells as it is rather an interplay between immune cells, neurons, and other cell types (epithelial cells etc.).

=== TRPV1 and cancer ===
TRPV1 was found to be overexpressed in several types of cancers, e.g., pancreatic cancer and colon adenocarcinoma. This suggests that certain types of cancers might be more prone to cell death mediated by capsaicin-induced (and also other vanilloid-induced) cell death. Indeed, studies have shown inversed correlation of consumption of chili-based foods and all-cause mortality along with cancers. This beneficial impact of the consumption of chili-based foods was attributed to capsaicinoid content.

TRPV1 activation caused by its agonist capsaicin was shown to induce G0-G1 cell arrest and apoptosis in leukemic cell lines, adult T-cell leukaemia and multiple myeloma. Capsaicin reduces the expression of anti-apoptotic protein Bcl-2 and it also promotes activation of p53, a tumour-suppressor protein known as a major regulator of cell death. This effect of capsaicin in both cases subsequently leads to above-mentioned apoptosis.

=== TRPV1 and neuroinflammation ===
The interplay between neurons and immune cells (also known as the neuro-immune axis) is a well-known phenomenon. TRPV1 plays its role in neuroinflammation, being expressed both in neurons, microglia, and astrocytes. Studying TRPV1's involvement in neuroinflammation has potential therapeutical significance.

Cutaneus neurons expressing TRPV1 and dendritic cells were found to be located close to each other. Activation of TRPV1 channels in neurons is associated with subsequent production of interleukin 23 (IL-23) by dendritic cells and further production of IL-17 by T cells. These interleukins are important for host defence against pathogenic fungi (such as Candida albicans) and bacteria (such as Staphylococcus aureus), thus TRPV1's activation can lead to better defence against these pathogens, thanks to the neuro-immune axis.

TRPV1 is said to contribute to autophagy of microglia via its Ca^{2+}-signalling, which leads to mitochondria-induced cell death. The TRPV1 channel also influences microglia-induced inflammation. Migration and chemotaxis of microglia and astrocytes seems to be affected by TRPV1's interaction with the cytoskeleton and Ca^{2+}-signalling. TRPV1 is therefore involved in the neuro-immune axis via its function in microglia as well.

TRPV1 was shown to have protective effect in neurologic disorders such as Huntington's disease, vascular dementia, and Parkinson's disease. However, its precise function needs to be further explored.

== Ligands ==
=== Antagonists ===
Antagonists block TRPV1 activity, thus reducing pain. Identified antagonists include the competitive antagonist capsazepine and the non-competitive antagonist ruthenium red. These agents could be useful when applied systemically. Numerous TRPV1 antagonists have been developed by pharmaceutical companies. TRPV1 antagonists have shown efficacy in reducing nociception from inflammatory and neuropathic pain models in rats. This provides evidence that TRPV1 is capsaicin's sole receptor. In humans, drugs acting at TRPV1 receptors could be used to treat neuropathic pain associated with multiple sclerosis, chemotherapy, or amputation, as well as pain associated with the inflammatory response of damaged tissue, such as in osteoarthritis.

These drugs can affect body temperature (hyperthermia) which is a challenge to therapeutic application. For example, a transient temperature gain (~1 °C for a duration of approximately 40 minutes, reverting to baseline by 40 minutes) was measured in rats with the application of TRPV1 antagonist AMG-9810. The role of TRPV1 in the regulation of body temperature has emerged in the last few years. Based on a number of TRPV-selective antagonists' causing a mild increase in body temperature (hyperthermia), it was proposed that TRPV1 is tonically active in vivo and regulates body temperature by telling the body to "cool itself down". Without these signals, the body overheats. Likewise, this explains the propensity of capsaicin (a TRPV1 agonist) to cause sweating (i.e.: a signal to reduce body temperature). In a recent report, it was found that tonically active TRPV1 channels are present in the viscera and keep an ongoing suppressive effect on body temperature. Recently, it was proposed that predominant function of TRPV1 is body temperature maintenance. Experiments have shown that TRPV1 blockade increases body temperature in multiple species, including rodents and humans, suggesting that TRPV1 is involved in body temperature maintenance. In 2008, AMG-517, a highly selective TRPV1 antagonist was dropped out of clinical trials due to the causation of hyperthermia (~38.3 °C mean increase which was most intense on day 1 but was attenuated on days 2–7. Another molecule, SB-705498, was also evaluated in the clinic but its effect on body temperature was not reported. As we increase understanding of modality specific agonism of TRPV1 it seems that next generation therapeutics targeting TRPV1 have the potential to side-step hyperthermia. Moreover, for at least two indications or approaches this may be a secondary issue. Where the therapeutic approach (e.g., in analgesia) is agonist-mediated desensitization then the hyperthermic effects of antagonists may not be relevant. Secondarily in applications such as TRPV1 antagonism for the treatment of severe conditions such as heart failure, then there may be an acceptable trade-off with mild hyperthermia, although no hyperthermia was observed in rodent models of heart failure treated with BCTC, SB-366791 or AMG-9810. Post translational modification of TRPV1 protein by its phosphorylation is critical for its functionality. Reports published from NIH suggest that Cdk5-mediated phosphorylation of TRPV1 is required for its ligand-induced channel opening.

Motugivatrep is a TRPVI1 antagonist used to treat dry eye disease.

=== Agonists ===
TRPV1 is activated by numerous agonists from natural sources. Agonists such as capsaicin and resiniferatoxin activate TRPV1 and, upon prolonged application, cause TRPV1 activity to decrease (desensitization), leading to alleviation of pain via the subsequent decrease in the TRPV1 mediated release of inflammatory molecules following exposures to noxious stimuli. Agonists can be applied locally to the painful area in various forms, generally as a patch or an ointment. Numerous capsaicin-containing creams are available over the counter, containing low concentrations of capsaicin (0.025 - 0.075%). It is debated whether these preparations actually lead to TRPV1 desensitization; it is possible that they act via counter-irritation. Novel preparations containing higher capsaicin concentration (up to 10%) are under clinical trials. Eight percent capsaicin patches have recently become available for clinical use, with supporting evidence demonstrating that a 30-minute treatment can provide up to 3 months analgesia by causing regression of TRPV1-containing neurons in the skin. Currently, these treatments must be re-administered on a regular (albeit infrequent) schedule in order to maintain their analgesic effects.

==== Cannabinoid ligands ====
Cannabinoid ligands include:

- Cannabidiol (CBD) – agonist
- Cannabigerol (CBG) – agonist
- Tetrahydrocannabivarin (THCV) – agonist
- Cannabigerovarin (CBGV) – agonist

==== N-acyl amides ====
N-Acyl Amides that activate cannabimimetic receptors include:

- Anandamide (AEA)
- N-Arachidonoyl dopamine
- N-Oleoyl dopamine
- N-Arachidonoyl taurine
- N-Docosahexaenoyl ethanolamine
- N-Docosahexaenoyl GABA
- N-Docosahexaenoyl aspartic acid
- N-Docosahexaenoyl glycine
- N-Docosahexaenoyl serine
- N-Arachidonoyl GABA
- N-Linoleyl GABA

==== Fatty acid metabolites ====
Certain metabolites of polyunsaturated fatty acids have been shown to stimulate cells in a TRPV1-dependent fashion. The metabolites of linoleic acid, including 13(S)-hydroxy-9Z,11E-octadecadienoic acid (13(S)-HODE), 13(R)-hydroxy-9Z,11E-octadecadienoic acid (13(R)-HODE, 9(S)-hydroxy-10(E),12(Z)-octadecadienoic acid (9(S)-HODE), 9(R)-hydroxy-10(E),12(Z)-octadecadienoic acid (9(R)-HODE), and their respective keto analogs, 13-oxoODE and 9-oxoODE (see 13-HODE and 9-HODE sections on direct actions), activate peripheral and central mouse pain sensing neurons. Reports disagree on the potencies of these metabolites with, for example, the most potent one, 9(S)-HODE, requiring at least 10 micromoles/liter. or a more physiological concentration of 10 nanomoles/liter to activate TRPV1 in rodent neurons. The TRPV1-dependency of these metabolites' activities appears to reflect their direct interaction with TPRV1. Although relatively weak agonists of TRPV1 in comparison to anandamide, these linoleate metabolites have been proposed to act through TRPV1 in mediating pain perception in rodents and to cause injury to airway epithelial cells and thereby to contribute to asthma disease in mice and therefore possibly humans. Certain arachidonic acid metabolites, including 20-hydroxy-5Z,8Z,11Z,14Z-eicosatetraenoic acid (see 20-Hydroxyeicosatetraenoic acid) and 12(S)-hydroperoxy-5Z,8Z,10E,12S,14Z-eicosatetraenoic acid (12(S)-HpETE), 12(S)-hydroxy-5Z,8Z,10E,12S,14Z-eicosatetraenoic acid (12(S)-HETE (see 12-HETE), hepoxilin A3 (i.e. 8R/S-hydroxy-11,12-oxido-5Z,9E,14Z-eicosatrienoic acid) and HxB3 (i.e. 10R/S-hydroxy-11,12-oxido-5Z,8Z,14Z-eicosatrienoic acid) likewise activate TRPV1 and may thereby contribute to tactile hyperalgesia and allodynia (see Hepoxilin § Pain perception).

Studies with mice, guinea pig, and human tissues and in guinea pigs indicate that another arachidonic acid metabolite, Prostaglandin E2, operates through its prostaglandin EP3 G protein coupled receptor to trigger cough responses. Its mechanism of action involves activation and/or sensitization of TRPV1 (as well as TRPA1) receptors, presumably by an indirect mechanism. Genetic polymorphism in the EP3 receptor (rs11209716), has been associated with ACE inhibitor-induced cough in humans.

Resolvin E1 (RvE1), RvD2 (see resolvins), neuroprotectin D1 (NPD1), and maresin 1 (Mar1) are metabolites of the omega 3 fatty acids, eicosapentaenoic acid (for RvE1) or docosahexaenoic acid (for RvD2, NPD1, and Mar1). These metabolites are members of the specialized proresolving mediators (SPMs) class of metabolites that function to resolve diverse inflammatory reactions and diseases in animal models and, it is proposed, humans. These SPMs also dampen pain perception arising from various inflammation-based causes in animal models. The mechanism behind their pain-dampening effects involves the inhibition of TRPV1, probably (in at least certain cases) by an indirect effect wherein they activate other receptors located on the neurons or nearby microglia or astrocytes. CMKLR1, GPR32, FPR2, and NMDA receptors have been proposed to be the receptors through which these SPMs operate to down-regulate TRPV1 and thereby pain perception.

==== Fatty acid conjugates ====
N-Arachidonoyl dopamine, an endocannabinoid found in the human CNS, structurally similar to capsaicin, activates the TRPV1 channel with an EC_{50} of approximately of 50 nM.

N-Oleyl-dopamine, another endogenous agonist, binds to human VR1 with an Ki of 36 Nm.

Another endocannabinoid anandamide has also been shown to act on TRPV1 receptors.

AM404—an active metabolite of paracetamol (also known as acetaminophen)—that serves as an anandamide reuptake inhibitor and COX inhibitor also serves as a potent TRPV1 agonist.

The plant-biosynthesized cannabinoid cannabidiol also shows "either direct or indirect activation" of TRPV1 receptors. TRPV1 colocalizes with CB1 receptors and CB2 receptors in sensory and brain neurons respectively, and other plant-cannabinoids like CBN, CBG, CBC, THCV, and CBDV are also agonists of this ion channel. There is also evidence that non cannabinoid components of the Cannabis secondary metabolome such as myrcene activate TRPV1.

==== Vitamin d metabolites ====
The vitamin D metabolites calcifediol (25-hydroxy vitamin D or 25OHD) and calcitriol (1,25-hydroxy vitamin D or 1,25OHD) act as endogenous ligands of TRPV1.

=== Central nervous system ===
TRPV1 is also expressed at high levels in the central nervous system and has been proposed as a target for treatment not only of pain but also for other conditions such as anxiety. Furthermore, TRPV1 appears to mediate long-term synaptic depression (LTD) in the hippocampus. LTD has been linked to a decrease in the ability to make new memories, unlike its opposite long-term potentiation (LTP), which aids in memory formation. A dynamic pattern of LTD and LTP occurring at many synapses provides a code for memory formation. Long-term depression and subsequent pruning of synapses with reduced activity is an important aspect of memory formation. In rat brain slices, activation of TRPV1 with heat or capsaicin induced LTD while capsazepine blocked capsaicin's ability to induce LTD. In the brainstem (solitary tract nucleus), TRPV1 controls the asynchronous and spontaneous release of glutamate from unmyelinated cranial visceral afferents - release processes that are active at normal temperatures and hence quite distinct from TRPV1 responses in painful heat. Hence, there may be therapeutic potential in modulating TRPV1 in the central nervous system, perhaps as a treatment for epilepsy (TRPV1 is already a target in the peripheral nervous system for pain relief).

== Interactions ==
TRPV1 has been shown to interact with:

- CALM1
- SNAPAP
- SYT9
- CBD
- AEA
- NPR1
- PKG

== Discovery ==
The dorsal root ganglion (DRG) neurons of mammals were known to express a heat-sensitive ion channel that could be activated by capsaicin. The research group of David Julius, therefore, created a cDNA library of genes expressed in DRG neurons, expressed the clones in HEK 293 cells, and looked for cells that respond to capsaicin with calcium influx (which HEK-293 normally do not). After several rounds of screening and dividing the library, a single clone encoding the TRPV1 channel was finally identified in 1997. It was the first TRPV channel to be identified. Julius was awarded the 2021 Nobel prize in Physiology or Medicine for his discovery.

== See also ==
- Capsaicin
- Capsinoids
- Vanilloids
- Vanillotoxin
- Cannabinoid receptor
- Discovery and development of TRPV1 antagonists
- Ruthenium red
- Thermoreceptor
- Category:Somatosensory system
- Endocannabinoid system
