= 4-Oxo-2-nonenal =

Names
- Preferred IUPAC name (2E)-4-Oxonon-2-enal

Identifiers
CAS Number	103560-62-9
3D model (JSmol)	Interactive image
Beilstein Reference	4963551
ChEBI	CHEBI:58972
ChEMBL	ChEMBL1086447
ChemSpider	4949233
PubChem CID	6445537
CompTox Dashboard (EPA)	DTXSID701032845
- InChI: InChI=1S/C9H14O2/c1-2-3-4-6-9(11)7-5-8-10/h5,7-8H,2-4,6H2,1H3/b7-5+ COPY Key: SEPPVOUBHWNCAW-FNORWQNLSA-N
- SMILES: CCCCCC(=O)/C=C/C=O

Properties
Chemical formula	C_{9}H_{14}O_{2}
Molar mass	154.209 g·mol^{−1}
- Except where otherwise noted, data are given for materials in their standard state (at 25 °C [77 °F], 100 kPa). Infobox references

4-Oxo-2-nonenal is a lipid peroxidation product that can structurally alter proteins and induce α-synuclein oligomers.
