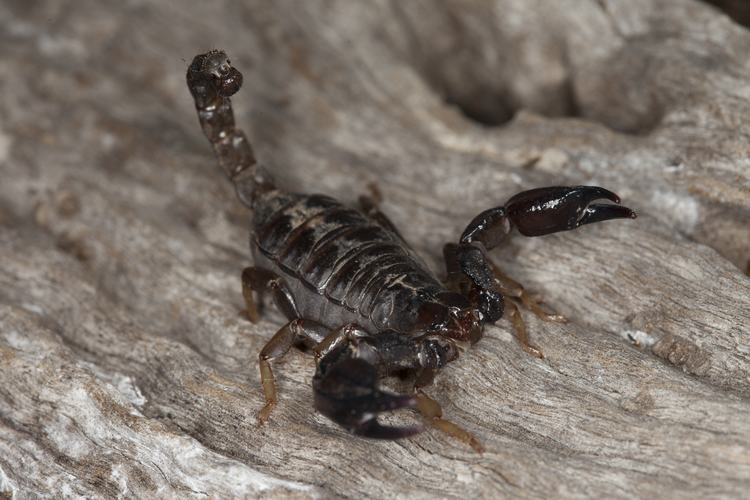

Scientific classification
- Kingdom: Animalia
- Phylum: Arthropoda
- Subphylum: Chelicerata
- Class: Arachnida
- Order: Scorpiones
- Family: Urodacidae
- Genus: Urodacus
- Species: U. manicatus

Binomial name
- Urodacus manicatus (Thorell, 1876)

Synonyms
- Urodacus abruptus Pocock, 1888; Buthus flavicruris Rainbow, 1896

= Urodacus manicatus =

Species of scorpion

Urodacus manicatus, commonly known as the black rock scorpion, is a species of scorpion belonging to the family Urodacidae. It is native to eastern Australia.

== History ==
The black rock scorpion was described by Swedish naturalist Tamerlan Thorell in 1876 as Ioctonus manicatus. The type locality was described as "New Holland". In 1888 Reginald Innes Pocock, an assistant at the Natural History Museum in London, was cataloging specimens of the genus and described what he thought was a new species—naming it U. abruptus— from two dried female specimens, one from Adelaide and the other labelled "New Holland". German naturalist Karl Kraepelin concluded that Thorell's I. manicatus was the same species as U. abruptus and U. novaehollandiae. It was also collected from Cooma by William Joseph Rainbow who named it Buthus flavicruris in 1896. The genus Urodacus was placed in its own family in 2000. Before this, the group had been a subfamily Urodacinae within the family Scorpionidae.

== Description ==
Measuring up to 5.5 cm (2.2 in), it is dark brown or black.

== Distribution and habitat ==
The species ranges from Queensland through New South Wales and Victoria into South Australia. Its preferred habitat is granite outcrops in open forest.

== Behaviour ==
The scorpion excavates a burrow underneath rocks or logs with a terminal chamber and passage to the surface. It preys upon insects such as cockroaches and beetles, as well as other invertebrates such as millipedes, centipedes, spiders and rarely earthworms. Its sting can cause local pain and swelling in humans.

== Conservation ==
It is one of the species of scorpion most commonly seen for sale in pet shops in Australia and is relatively easy to keep in captivity, where it has a lifespan of 6 to 10 years. There are concerns wild populations are being depleted because of specimens taken for the pet trade.

== Venom ==
U. manicatus was recently shown to harbor a unique peptide toxin, presumably for defensive purposes. This cell-penetrating peptide selectively activates mammalian TRPA1 receptors, which are expressed in pain-sensing peripheral neurons, to produce acute pain and pain hypersensitivities, but not inflammation. For mechanistic insights into this discrepancy, see ref. Because TRPA1 is also known as the 'Wasabi Receptor,' given its role as the principle detector of the piquant ingredients in Brassica and Allium (mustard and onion) family plants, this U. manicatus toxin has been named the Wasabi Receptor Toxin or WaTx
