= AMG-517 =

Chemical compound

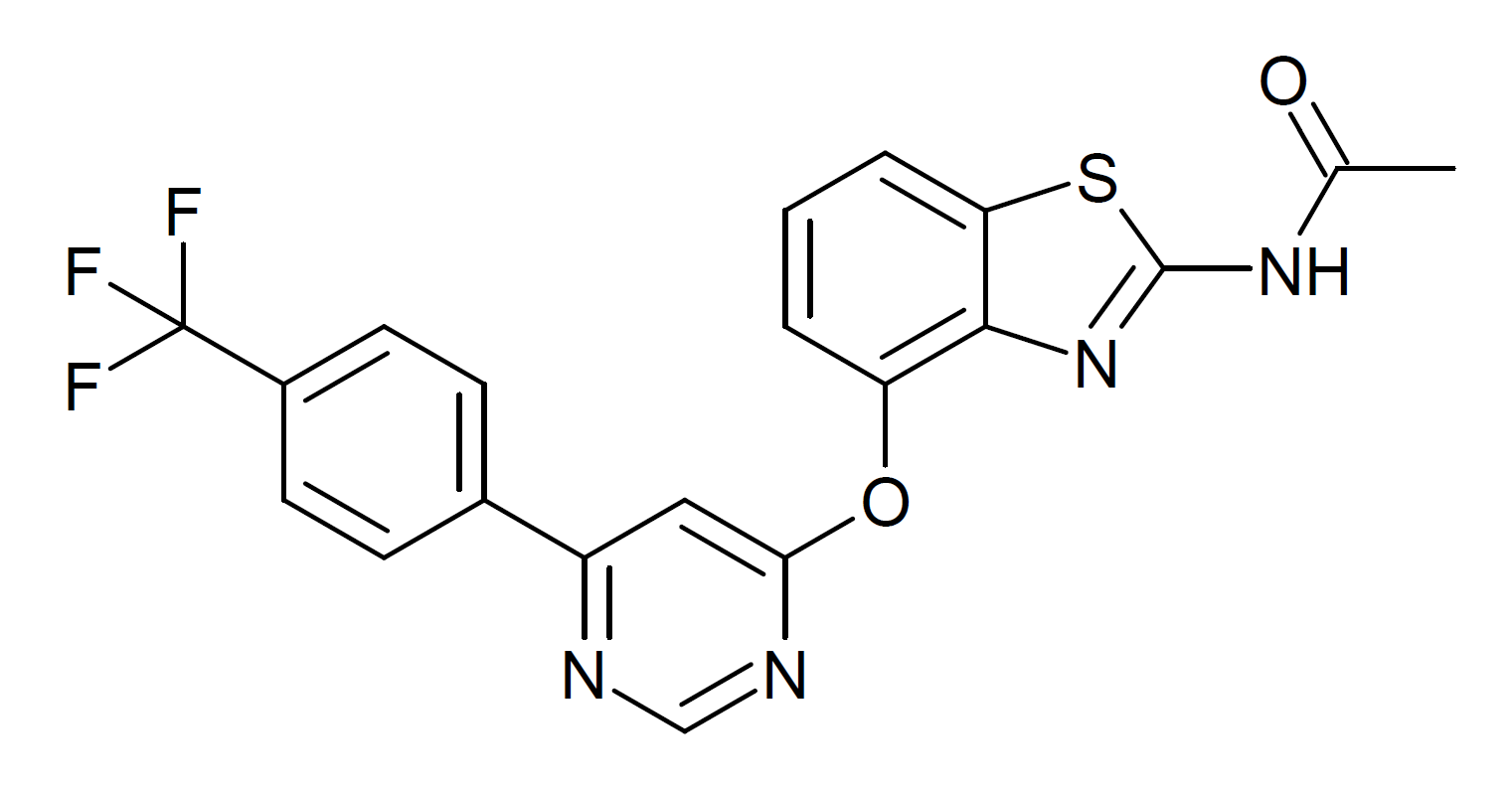

Identifiers
- IUPAC name: N-(4-{6-[4-(trifluoromethyl)phenyl]pyrimidin-4-yl}oxy-1,3-benzothiazol-2-yl)acetamide
- CAS Number: 659730-32-2
- PubChem CID: 16007367
- ChemSpider: 10609411
- UNII: 172V4FBZ75
- ChEMBL: ChEMBL229430
- CompTox Dashboard (EPA): DTXSID90216178

Chemical and physical data
- Formula: C_{20}H_{13}F_{3}N_{4}O_{2}S
- Molar mass: 430.41 g·mol^{−1}
- 3D model (JSmol): Interactive image
- SMILES: CC(=O)NC1=NC2=C(C=CC=C2S1)OC3=NC=NC(=C3)C4=CC=C(C=C4)C(F)(F)F
- InChI: InChI=1S/C20H13F3N4O2S/c1-11(28)26-19-27-18-15(3-2-4-16(18)30-19)29-17-9-14(24-10-25-17)12-5-7-13(8-6-12)20(21,22)23/h2-10H,1H3,(H,26,27,28); Key:YUTIXVXZQIQWGY-UHFFFAOYSA-N

AMG-517 is a drug which acts as a potent and selective blocker of the TRPV1 ion channel. It was developed as a potential treatment for chronic pain, but while it was an effective analgesic in animal studies it was dropped from human clinical trials at Phase I due to producing hyperthermia as a side effect, as well as poor water solubility. It is still used in scientific research into the function of the TRPV1 channel and its role in pain and inflammation, and has been used as a template for the design of several newer analogues which have improved properties.

== See also ==
- AMG-9810
- SB-705498
- Discovery and development of TRPV1 antagonists
