= N-Arachidonoyl dopamine =

Chemical compound

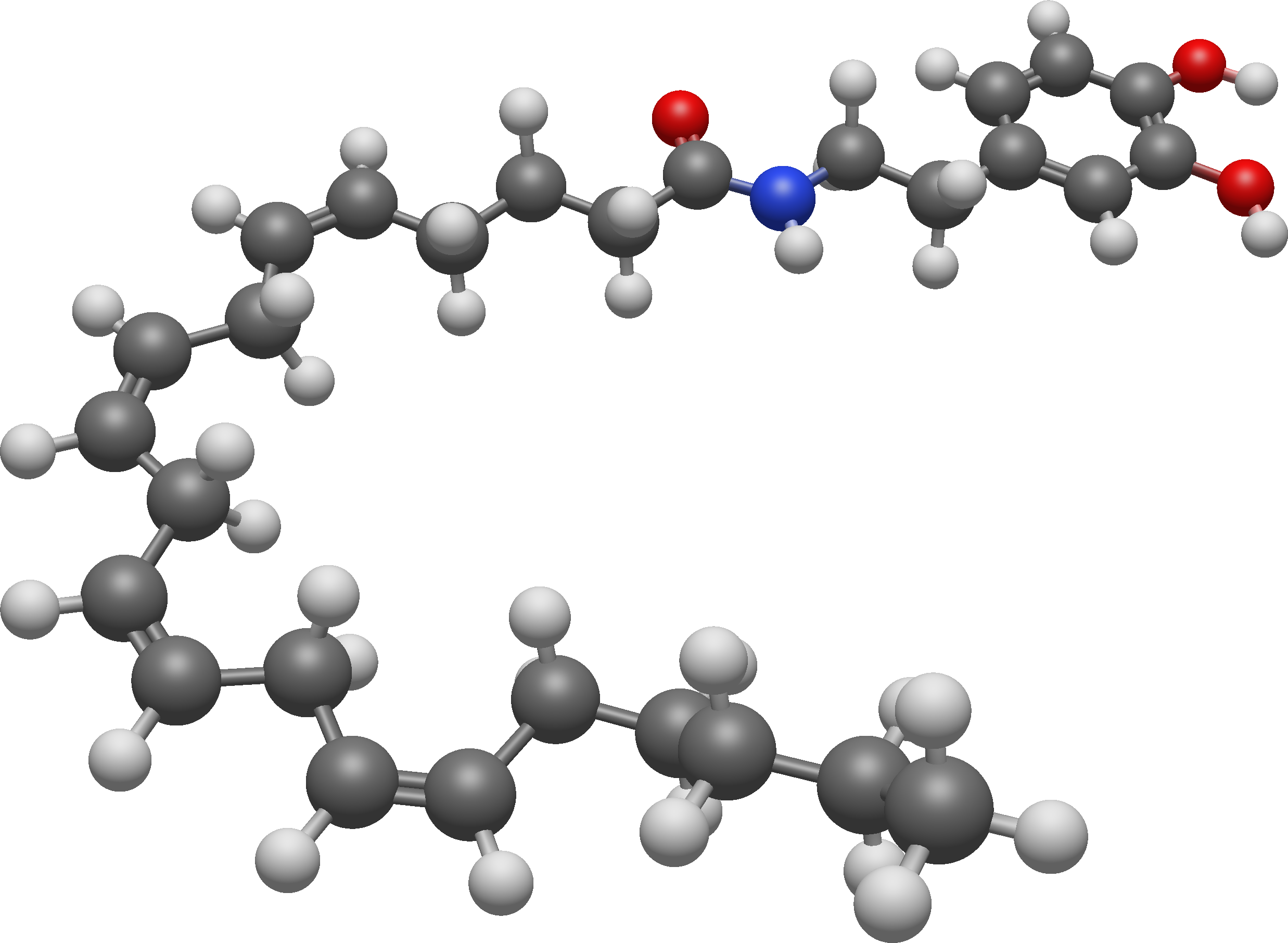

Names
- Preferred IUPAC name (5Z,8Z,11Z,14Z)-N-[2-(3,4-Dihydroxyphenyl)ethyl]icosa-5,8,11,14-tetraenamide
- Other names NADA

Identifiers
CAS Number	199875-69-9
3D model (JSmol)	Interactive image
ChEMBL	ChEMBL138921
ChemSpider	4445314
IUPHAR/BPS	4261
PubChem CID	5282105
UNII	Q8NX2KL2YP
CompTox Dashboard (EPA)	DTXSID70415208
- InChI: InChI=1S/C28H41NO3/c1-2-3-4-5-6-7-8-9-10-11-12-13-14-15-16-17-18-19-28(32)29-23-22-25-20-21-26(30)27(31)24-25/h6-7,9-10,12-13,15-16,20-21,24,30-31H,2-5,8,11,14,17-19,22-23H2,1H3,(H,29,32)/b7-6-,10-9-,13-12-,16-15- Key: MVVPIAAVGAWJNQ-DOFZRALJSA-N; InChI=1/C28H41NO3/c1-2-3-4-5-6-7-8-9-10-11-12-13-14-15-16-17-18-19-28(32)29-23-22-25-20-21-26(30)27(31)24-25/h6-7,9-10,12-13,15-16,20-21,24,30-31H,2-5,8,11,14,17-19,22-23H2,1H3,(H,29,32)/b7-6-,10-9-,13-12-,16-15- Key: MVVPIAAVGAWJNQ-DOFZRALJBM
- SMILES: CCCCC\C=C/C\C=C/C\C=C/C\C=C/CCCC(=O)NCCC1=CC(=C(C=C1)O)O

Properties
Chemical formula	C_{28}H_{41}NO_{3}
Molar mass	439.63 g/mol
- Except where otherwise noted, data are given for materials in their standard state (at 25 °C [77 °F], 100 kPa). verify (what is ?) Infobox references

N-Arachidonoyl dopamine (NADA) is an endocannabinoid that acts as an agonist of the CB_{1} receptor and the transient receptor potential V1 (TRPV1) ion channel. NADA was first described as a putative endocannabinoid (agonist for the CB_{1} receptor) in 2000 and was subsequently identified as an endovanilloid (agonist for TRPV1) in 2002. NADA is an endogenous arachidonic acid based lipid found in the brain of rats, with especially high concentrations in the hippocampus, cerebellum, and striatum. It activates the TRPV1 channel with an EC_{50} of approximately of 50 nM which makes it the putative endogenous TRPV1 agonist.

In mice, NADA was shown to induce the tetrad of physiological paradigms associated with cannabinoids: hypothermia, hypo-locomotion, catalepsy, and analgesia. NADA has been found to play a regulatory role in both the peripheral and central nervous systems, and displays antioxidant and neuroprotectant properties. NADA has also been implicated in smooth muscle contraction and vasorelaxation in blood vessels. Additionally, NADA has been observed to suppress inflammatory activation of human Jurkat T cells and to inhibit the release of prostaglandin E2 (PGE2) from lipopolysaccharide (LPS)-activated astrocytes, microglia and mouse brain ECs (MEC-Brain). NADA also promotes the resolution of inflammation in human endothelial cells activated by both endogenous (i.e. TNF) and exogenous (i.e. bacterial derived LPS (TLR4 agonist) and FSL-1 (Fibroblast-Stimulating Lipopeptide, TLR2 and TLR6 agonist)) inflammatory mediators. It can increase the TRPV1-mediated release of substance P and calcitonin gene-related peptide (CGRP) in rat dorsal spinal cord slices. Furthermore, NADA also displays inhibitory activity in HIV-1 replication assays. Finally, NADA can prevent the degranulation and release of TNF from RBL- 2H3 (Rodent Basophilic Leukemia; Histamine Releasing, Group 3) mast cells treated with an IgE-antigen complex. Together, these studies show that physiological functions attributed to NADA are multifaceted, and include the ability to modulate the immune response.

The biosynthetic pathway of N-arachindonoyl dopamine is not well understood. It has been proposed to be conjugated from arachidonoyl-CoA or arachidonoyl phospholipids and dopamine, but in vitro experiments do not support this theory. However, the indirect biosynthesis of phospholipid esters with dopamine may be possible, as dopamine can induce the aminolysis of the glycerol-fatty acid bonds in phospholipid chains (arachidonoyl, palmitoyl, linoleyl, etc.).

== See also ==
- Endocannabinoid
- Phospholipase A_{2}
