= PIP2 (disambiguation) =

PIP_{2}, or phosphatidylinositol biphosphate, is the products obtained by cleavage of PIP_{3}, or by phosphorylation of PI(3)P, PI(4)P or PI(5)P.

'PIP_{2}' most frequently refers to:

- Phosphatidylinositol 4,5-bisphosphate, also known as PI(4,5)P_{2}

The other PIP_{2} lipids are:

- Phosphatidylinositol 3,4-bisphosphate, also known as PI(3,4)P_{2}
- Phosphatidylinositol 3,5-bisphosphate, also known as PI(3,5)P_{2}
