= AMG-9810 =

Chemical compound

Identifiers
- IUPAC name: (E)-3-(4-tert-butylphenyl)-N-(2,3-dihydro-1,4-benzodioxin-6-yl)prop-2-enamide
- CAS Number: 545395-94-6
- PubChem CID: 680502
- ChemSpider: 592741
- UNII: 182HIJ2D7F
- ChEBI: CHEBI:92757
- ChEMBL: ChEMBL195789
- CompTox Dashboard (EPA): DTXSID40202960
- ECHA InfoCard: 100.164.996

Chemical and physical data
- Formula: C_{21}H_{23}NO_{3}
- Molar mass: 337.419 g·mol^{−1}
- 3D model (JSmol): Interactive image
- SMILES: CC(C)(C)C1=CC=C(C=C1)/C=C/C(=O)NC2=CC3=C(C=C2)OCCO3
- InChI: InChI=1S/C21H23NO3/c1-21(2,3)16-7-4-15(5-8-16)6-11-20(23)22-17-9-10-18-19(14-17)25-13-12-24-18/h4-11,14H,12-13H2,1-3H3,(H,22,23)/b11-6+; Key:GZTFUVZVLYUPRG-IZZDOVSWSA-N

AMG-9810 is a drug which acts as a potent and selective antagonist for the TRPV1 receptor. It has analgesic and antiinflammatory effects and is used in scientific research, but has not been developed for medical use. It has high antagonist potency and good bioavailability and pharmacokinetics, and so has been used to study the role of TRPV1 in areas other than pain perception, such as its roles in the brain.

== See also ==
- AMG-517
- SB-705498
