= List of Trechaleidae species =

Spider species

This page lists all described species of the spider family Trechaleidae accepted by the World Spider Catalog as of January 2021:

== A ==
=== Amapalea ===
Amapalea Silva & Lise, 2006

- A. brasiliana Silva & Lise, 2006 (type) — Brazil

== B ==
=== Barrisca ===
Barrisca Chamberlin & Ivie, 1936

- B. kochalkai Platnick, 1978 — Colombia, Venezuela
- B. nannella Chamberlin & Ivie, 1936 (type) — Panama, Colombia, Peru

== C ==
=== Caricelea ===
Caricelea Silva & Lise, 2007

- C. apurimac Silva & Lise, 2009 — Peru
- C. camisea Silva & Lise, 2009 — Peru
- C. wayrapata Silva & Lise, 2007 (type) — Peru

=== Cupiennius ===
Cupiennius Simon, 1891

- C. bimaculatus (Taczanowski, 1874) — Colombia, Venezuela, Brazil, Guyana, Ecuador
- C. chiapanensis Medina, 2006 — Mexico
- C. coccineus F. O. Pickard-Cambridge, 1901 — Costa Rica to Colombia
- C. cubae Strand, 1909 — Cuba, Costa Rica to Venezuela
- C. foliatus F. O. Pickard-Cambridge, 1901 — Costa Rica, Panama
- C. getazi Simon, 1891 (type) — Costa Rica, Panama
- C. granadensis (Keyserling, 1877) — Costa Rica to Colombia
- C. remedius Barth & Cordes, 1998 — Guatemala
- C. salei (Keyserling, 1877) — Mexico, Central America, Hispaniola
- C. valentinei (Petrunkevitch, 1925) — Panama
- C. vodou Brescovit & Polotow, 2005 — Hispaniola

== D ==
=== Dossenus ===
Dossenus Simon, 1898

- D. guapore Silva, Lise & Carico, 2007 — Panama, Colombia, Brazil
- D. marginatus Simon, 1898 (type) — Trinidad, Colombia, Peru, Brazil
- D. paraensis Silva & Lise, 2011 — Brazil

=== Dyrines ===
Dyrines Simon, 1903

- D. brescoviti Silva & Lise, 2010 — Brazil
- D. ducke Carico & Silva, 2008 — Brazil
- D. huanuco Carico & Silva, 2008 — Peru
- D. striatipes (Simon, 1898) (type) — Panama, Venezuela, Guyana

== E ==
=== Enna ===
Enna O. Pickard-Cambridge, 1897

- E. baeza Silva, Lise & Carico, 2008 — Ecuador, Peru
- E. bartica Silva, Lise & Carico, 2008 — Brazil, Guyana
- E. bonaldoi Silva, Lise & Carico, 2008 — Peru, Brazil
- E. caliensis Silva, Lise & Carico, 2008 — Colombia, Bolivia
- E. caparao Silva & Lise, 2009 — Brazil
- E. caricoi Silva & Lise, 2011 — Colombia
- E. carinata Silva & Lise, 2011 — Panama
- E. chickeringi Silva, Lise & Carico, 2008 — Honduras, Costa Rica
- E. colonche Silva, Lise & Carico, 2008 — Ecuador
- E. eberhardi Silva, Lise & Carico, 2008 — Costa Rica, Panama
- E. echarate Silva & Lise, 2009 — Peru
- E. estebanensis (Simon, 1898) — Venezuela, Ecuador
- E. frijoles Silva & Lise, 2011 — Panama
- E. gloriae Rengifo, Albo & Delgado-Santa, 2021 — Colombia
- E. hara Silva, Lise & Carico, 2008 — Peru
- E. huanuco Silva, Lise & Carico, 2008 — Peru
- E. igarape Silva, Lise & Carico, 2008 — Peru, Brazil
- E. jullieni (Simon, 1898) — Panama, Colombia, Venezuela
- E. junin (Carico & Silva, 2010) — Peru
- E. kuyuwiniensis Silva, Lise & Carico, 2008 — Guyana
- E. maya Silva, Lise & Carico, 2008 — Honduras, Costa Rica, Peru
- E. meridionalis Silva & Lise, 2009 — Brazil
- E. minor Petrunkevitch, 1925 — Panama, Colombia
- E. moyobamba Silva, Víquez & Lise, 2012 — Peru
- E. nesiotes Chamberlin, 1925 — Panama
- E. osaensis Silva, Víquez & Lise, 2012 — Costa Rica
- E. paraensis Silva, Lise & Carico, 2008 — Brazil
- E. pecki Silva, Lise & Carico, 2008 — Costa Rica
- E. redundans (Platnick, 1993) — Brazil
- E. rioja Silva, 2013 — Peru
- E. riotopo Silva, Lise & Carico, 2008 — Ecuador
- E. rothi Silva, Lise & Carico, 2008 — Ecuador
- E. segredo Silva & Lise, 2009 — Brazil
- E. silvae Silva & Lise, 2011 — Peru
- E. triste Silva & Lise, 2011 — Venezuela
- E. trivittata Silva & Lise, 2009 — Peru, Brazil
- E. velox O. Pickard-Cambridge, 1897 (type) — Mexico
- E. venezuelana Silva & Lise, 2011 — Venezuela
- E. xingu Carico & Silva, 2010 — Brazil
- E. zurqui Silva & Lise, 2011 — Costa Rica

=== † Eotrechalea ===
† Eotrechalea Wunderlich, 2004 - †Eotrechaleinae

- † E. annulata Wunderlich, 2004

=== † Esuritor ===
† Esuritor Petrunkevitch, 1942 - †Eotrechaleinae

- † E. aculeatus Petrunkevitch, 1958
- † E. spinipes Petrunkevitch, 1942

== H ==
=== Heidrunea ===
Heidrunea Brescovit & Höfer, 1994

- H. arijana Brescovit & Höfer, 1994 — Brazil
- H. irmleri Brescovit & Höfer, 1994 (type) — Brazil
- H. lobrita Brescovit & Höfer, 1994 — Brazil

=== Hesydrus ===
Hesydrus Simon, 1898

- H. aurantius (Mello-Leitão, 1942) — Colombia, Peru, Bolivia
- H. canar Carico, 2005 — Colombia, Ecuador, Peru
- H. caripito Carico, 2005 — Colombia, Venezuela, Peru
- H. chanchamayo Carico, 2005 — Peru
- H. habilis (O. Pickard-Cambridge, 1896) — Guatemala, Costa Rica, Panama
- H. palustris Simon, 1898 (type) — Columbia, Ecuador, Peru, Bolivia
- H. yacuiba Carico, 2005 — Bolivia

== L ==
=== † Linoptes ===
† Linoptes Menge, 1854 - †Eotrechaleinae

- † L. oculeus Menge, 1854
- † L. valdespinosa Petrunkevitch, 1958

== N ==
=== Neoctenus ===
Neoctenus Simon, 1897

- N. comosus Simon, 1897 (type) — Brazil
- N. eximius Mello-Leitão, 1938 — Brazil
- N. finneganae Mello-Leitão, 1948 — Guyana
- N. peruvianus (Chamberlin, 1916) — Peru

== P ==
=== Paradossenus ===
Paradossenus F. O. Pickard-Cambridge, 1903

- P. acanthocymbium Carico & Silva, 2010 — Brazil
- P. benicito Carico & Silva, 2010 — Bolivia, Brazil
- P. caricoi Sierwald, 1993 — Colombia, Guyana
- P. corumba Brescovit & Raizer, 2000 — Brazil, Paraguay
- P. isthmus Carico & Silva, 2010 — Nicaragua to Colombia
- P. longipes (Taczanowski, 1874) (type) — Venezuela to Argentina
- P. makuxi Silva & Lise, 2011 — Brazil
- P. minimus (Mello-Leitão, 1940) — Brazil
- P. pozo Carico & Silva, 2010 — Colombia, Venezuela, Brazil
- P. pulcher Sierwald, 1993 — Venezuela, Ecuador, Brazil
- P. sabana Carico & Silva, 2010 — Venezuela
- P. santaremensis (Silva & Lise, 2006) — Brazil
- P. tocantins Carico & Silva, 2010 — Brazil

=== Paratrechalea ===
Paratrechalea Carico, 2005

- P. azul Carico, 2005 — Brazil
- P. galianoae Carico, 2005 — Brazil, Argentina
- P. julyae Silva & Lise, 2006 — Brazil
- P. longigaster Carico, 2005 — Brazil, Argentina
- P. ornata (Mello-Leitão, 1943) (type) — Brazil, Uruguay, Argentina
- P. saopaulo Carico, 2005 — Brazil
- P. wygodzinskyi (Soares & Camargo, 1948) — Brazil

== R ==
=== Rhoicinus ===
Rhoicinus Simon, 1898

- R. andinus Exline, 1960 — Peru
- R. fuscus (Caporiacco, 1947) — Guyana
- R. gaujoni Simon, 1898 (type) — Ecuador, Brazil
- R. lugato Höfer & Brescovit, 1994 — Brazil
- R. rothi Exline, 1960 — Peru
- R. schlingeri Exline, 1960 — Peru
- R. urucu Brescovit & Oliveira, 1994 — Brazil
- R. wallsi Exline, 1950 — Ecuador
- R. wapleri Simon, 1898 — Venezuela
- R. weyrauchi Exline, 1960 — Peru

== S ==
=== Shinobius ===
Shinobius Yaginuma, 1991

- S. orientalis (Yaginuma, 1967) (type) — Japan

=== Syntrechalea ===
Syntrechalea

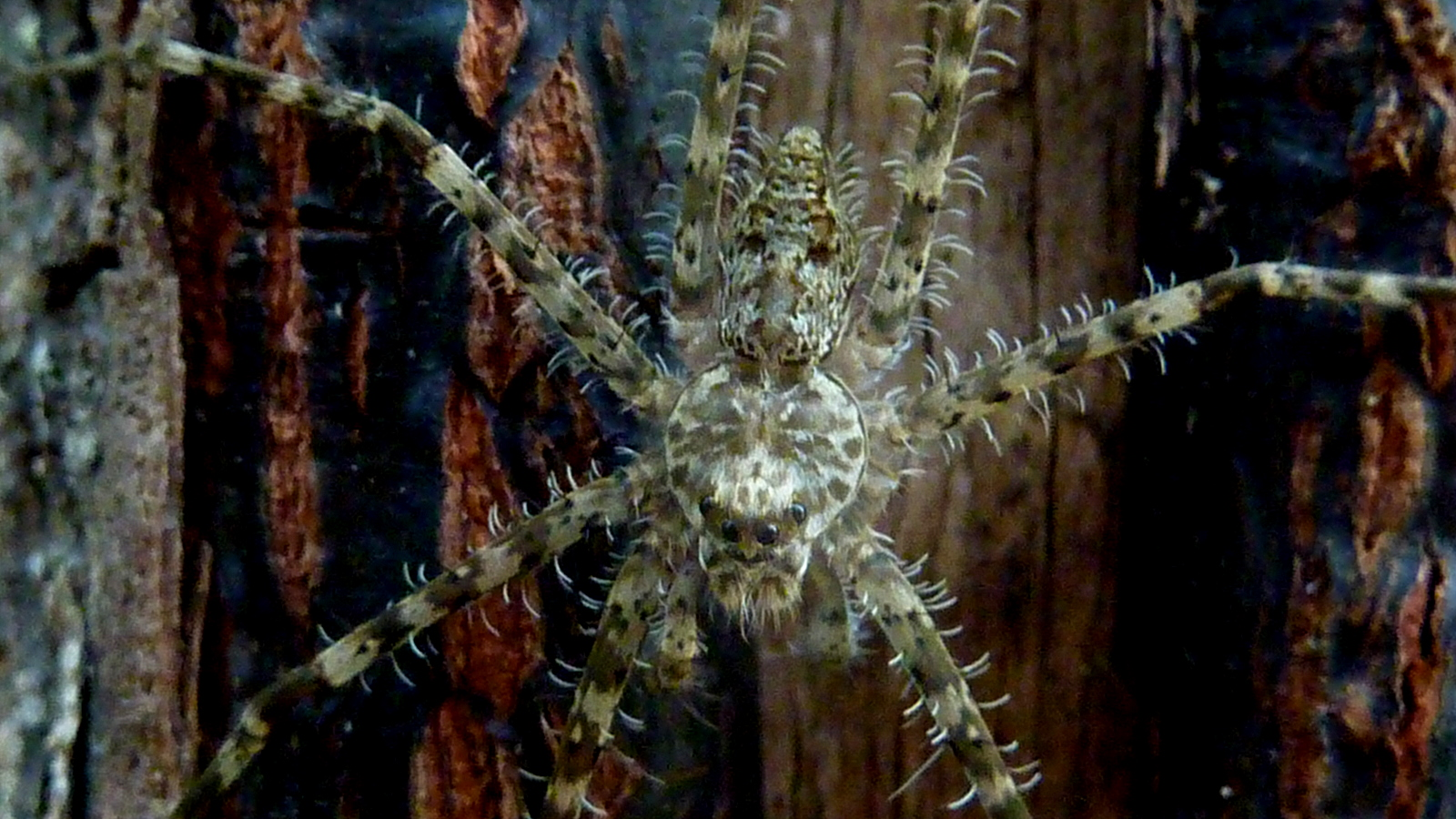
Syntrechalea sp.

Syntrechalea F. O. Pickard-Cambridge, 1902

- S. adis Carico, 2008 — Venezuela, Brazil, Surinam, Peru
- S. boliviensis (Carico, 1993) — Colombia, Peru, Bolivia, Brazil
- S. brasilia Carico, 2008 — Brazil
- S. caballero Carico, 2008 — Brazil, Paraguay
- S. caporiacco Carico, 2008 — Venezuela, Brazil, Guyana, Peru
- S. lomalinda (Carico, 1993) — Colombia, Venezuela, Brazil
- S. napoensis Carico, 2008 — Ecuador, Brazil
- S. neblina Silva & Lise, 2010 — Brazil
- S. reimoseri (Caporiacco, 1947) — Brazil, Guyana, Ecuador, Peru
- S. robusta Silva & Lise, 2010 — Brazil
- S. syntrechaloides (Mello-Leitão, 1941) — Colombia, Venezuela, Brazil, Guyana, Peru, Bolivia
- S. tenuis F. O. Pickard-Cambridge, 1902 (type) — Mexico to Brazil

== T ==
=== Trechalea ===
Trechalea Thorell, 1869

- T. amazonica F. O. Pickard-Cambridge, 1903 — Trinidad, Colombia, Brazil
- T. bucculenta (Simon, 1898) — Colombia, Brazil, Argentina, Bolivia
- T. connexa (O. Pickard-Cambridge, 1898) — Mexico
- T. extensa (O. Pickard-Cambridge, 1896) — Mexico to Panama
- T. gertschi Carico & Minch, 1981 — USA, Mexico
- T. longitarsis (C. L. Koch, 1847) (type) — Colombia, Ecuador, Peru
- T. macconnelli Pocock, 1900 — Ecuador, Peru, Brazil, Guyana, Suriname
- T. paucispina Caporiacco, 1947 — Peru, Brazil, Guyana
- T. tirimbina Silva & Lapinski, 2012 — Costa Rica

=== Trechaleoides ===
Trechaleoides Carico, 2005

- T. biocellata (Mello-Leitão, 1926) — Brazil, Paraguay, Argentina
- T. keyserlingi (F. O. Pickard-Cambridge, 1903) (type) — Brazil, Paraguay, Uruguay, Argentina
