= U7-ctenitoxin-Pn1a =

U_{7}-ctenitoxin-Pn1a (or U_{7}-CNTX-Pn1a for short) is a neurotoxin that blocks TRPV1 channels, and can exhibit analgestic effects. It is naturally found in the venom of Phoneutria nigriventer.

== Etymology ==
The proposed name for the toxin is U_{7}-ctenitoxin-Pn1a. Here, 'ctenitoxin' refers to toxins found in the venom of spiders from the Ctenidae family. 'Pn' is an acronym for Phoneutria nigriventer, referring to the genus and species of the animal it was isolated from.

A commonly used alternative name for U_{7}-CNTX-Pn1a is PnTx3-5, which is an acronym for Phoneutria nigriventer Toxin 3–5. Here, 3 refers to it being part of the third toxic protein fraction that was isolated from the venom using a technique involving a combination of gel filtration and reverse phase fast protein liquid chromatography. Similarly, 5 refers to it being the fifth peptide that was separated from this fraction through reverse phase and ion-exchange high-performance liquid chromatography.

== Sources ==
U_{7}-CNTX-Pn1a is naturally found in the venom of Phoneutria nigriventer, often referred to as the Brazilian wandering or 'armed' spider. Additionally, the recombinant protein has been produced based on the amino acid sequence derived from the isolated neurotoxin.

== Chemistry ==
=== Structure ===
U_{7}-CNTX-Pn1a is a 5063.6 g/mole, 45 amino acid protein (UNIPROT: P81791). The amino acid sequence of the mature protein is:

0 GCIGRNESCK FDRHGCCWPW SCSCWNKEGQ PESDVWCECS LKIGK 45

The expected structure of the neurotoxin consists of four disulfide bonds, which are arranged in the following manner: 1–4, 2–5, 3–8, 6–7. Three of the disulfide bonds are believed to form an inhibitor cystine knot, which is known to increase resistance to heat denaturation and proteolysis. Transcriptomics has revealed the presence of both an N-terminal signal peptide and a pro peptide, which are cleaved after translation.

=== Family ===
U_{7}-CNTX-Pn1a is considered as a member of the CSTX family. Although this family mainly contains toxins found in the venom of Cupiennius salei, U_{7}-CNTX-Pn1a is also included because of its highly similar disulfide bond structure.

== Target and molecular mechanism ==
When U_{7}-CNTX-Pn1a was tested on HEK 293 cells that were transfected with rTRPV1, capsaicin receptor, induced inward Ca^{2+} currents were blocked. U_{7}-CNTX-Pn1a inhibited the release of glutamate from the trigeminal ganglion. This together suggests that the toxin blocks TRPV1 receptors. In comparison to SB-366791, which is a selective TRPV1 blocker, the toxin was found to exert greater inhibitory potency as a much lower concentration was needed of the U_{7}-CNTX-Pn1a, with an IC_{50} of 47 ± 0.18nM, 45 ± 1.18nM and 390 ± 5.1nM for the native, recombinant U_{7}-CNTX-Pn1a and SB-366791, respectively. Additionally, in a neuropathic pain model the toxin was discovered to target L-type voltage-gated calcium channels (VGCCs) using L-type VGCC blockers. The mild antinociceptive effect reversed when U_{7}-CNTX-Pn1a was administered to the mice (30 fmol/site, i.t.), however, the exact underlying mechanism was not discovered yet.

== Toxicity ==
When applying 5 pg/mouse via intracerebroventricular injection U_{7}-CNTX-Pn1a was found to cause paralysis in the posterior limbs of the mice. Movement and aggression were observed to decrease within 24 h.

== Therapeutic use ==
U_{7}-CNTX-Pn1a can potentially be used as an analgesic and anti-nociception in a clinical setting or as a pharmacological tool to study the TRPV1 channel family. In various pain models it exhibited antinociceptive effects to different extents. In the incision model in postoperative pain, it reduced mechanical hyperalgesia in animal models (30–300 fmol/site, i.t.). Additionally, consistent antinociceptive effects were measured after daily use of U_{7}-CNTX-Pn1a (30 fmol/site, i.t.), and, in the partial sciatic nerve ligation model of neuropathic pain, a short-lasting reduction of mechanical hyperalgesia was observed (1h). The most promising and novel therapeutic use of U_{7}-CNTX-Pn1a is in cancer-related pain-models, which was applied in mice. 30 fmol/site, i.t. reduced mechanical hyperalgesia in these mice models also for mice that developed morphine tolerance.
