= Enna (disambiguation) =

Enna is a city in Sicily.

Enna may also refer to:

== People ==
- August Enna (1859–1939), Danish composer
- Franco Enna, pseudonym of Francesco Cannarozzo (1921–1990), Italian writer
- Enna Ben Abidi (fl. 2004), Paralympian athlete from Tunisia

== Other uses ==
- Enna (stream), in the Bergamo Alps of Italy
- Enna (spider), a genus of spiders
- Enna, the protagonist in Enna Burning by Shannon Hale
- Lakselv Airport, Banak, Norway, ICAO code ENNA
