= C. foliatus =

C. foliatus may refer to:

- Catopsalis foliatus, an extinct mammal species from the Paleocene of North America
- Culex foliatus, Brug, 1932, a species in the genus Culex found in South-East Asia
- Cupiennius foliatus, F. O. P.-Cambridge, 1901, a spider species found in Costa Rica and Panama

== See also ==
- Foliatus (disambiguation)
