= Metashinobius =

Scientific classification
- Kingdom: Animalia
- Phylum: Arthropoda
- Subphylum: Chelicerata
- Class: Arachnida
- Order: Araneae
- Infraorder: Araneomorphae
- Family: Trechaleidae
- Genus: Metashinobius; Wei & Liu, 2025
- Species: M. hikariae

Binomial name
- Metashinobius hikariae Wei & Liu, 2025

Species of spider

Metashinobius is a monotypic genus of spiders in the family Trechaleidae containing the single species, Metashinobius hikariae.

== Distribution ==
Metashinobius hikariae is endemic to Guizhou Province, China.

== Etymology ==
The genus name refers to the similarity with related genus Shinobius. The species is named after Hikari Kagura from the anime Revue Starlight.
