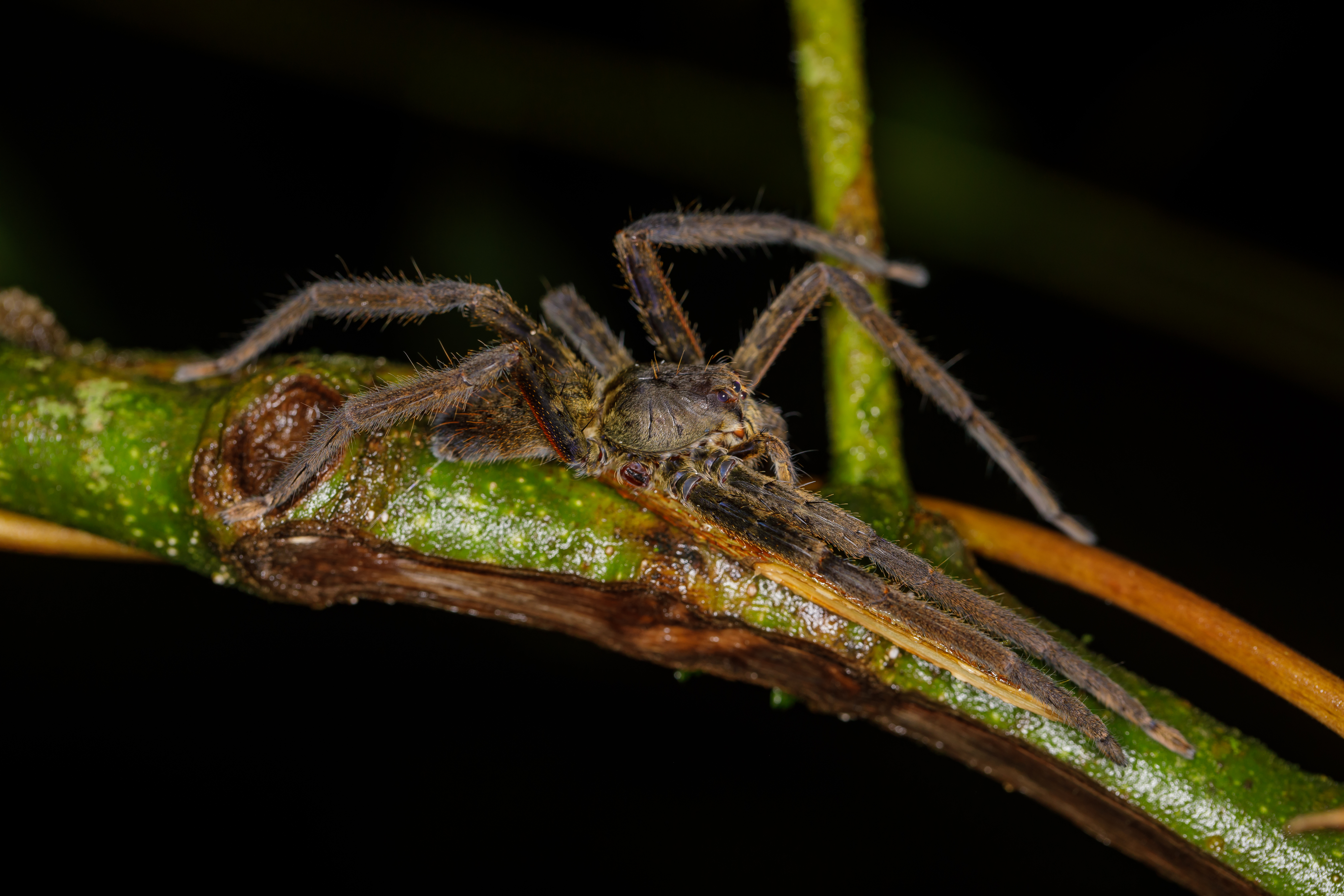

Scientific classification
- Kingdom: Animalia
- Phylum: Arthropoda
- Subphylum: Chelicerata
- Class: Arachnida
- Order: Araneae
- Infraorder: Araneomorphae
- Family: Trechaleidae
- Genus: Cupiennius
- Species: C. coccineus

Binomial name
- Cupiennius coccineus F.O.Pickard-Cambridge, 1901

= Cupiennius coccineus =

Species of spider

Cupiennius coccineus, also known by its common name red-thighed bromeliad spider, is a species from the genus Cupiennius.

== Description ==
Cupiennius coccineus are solitary and nocturnal Spider .

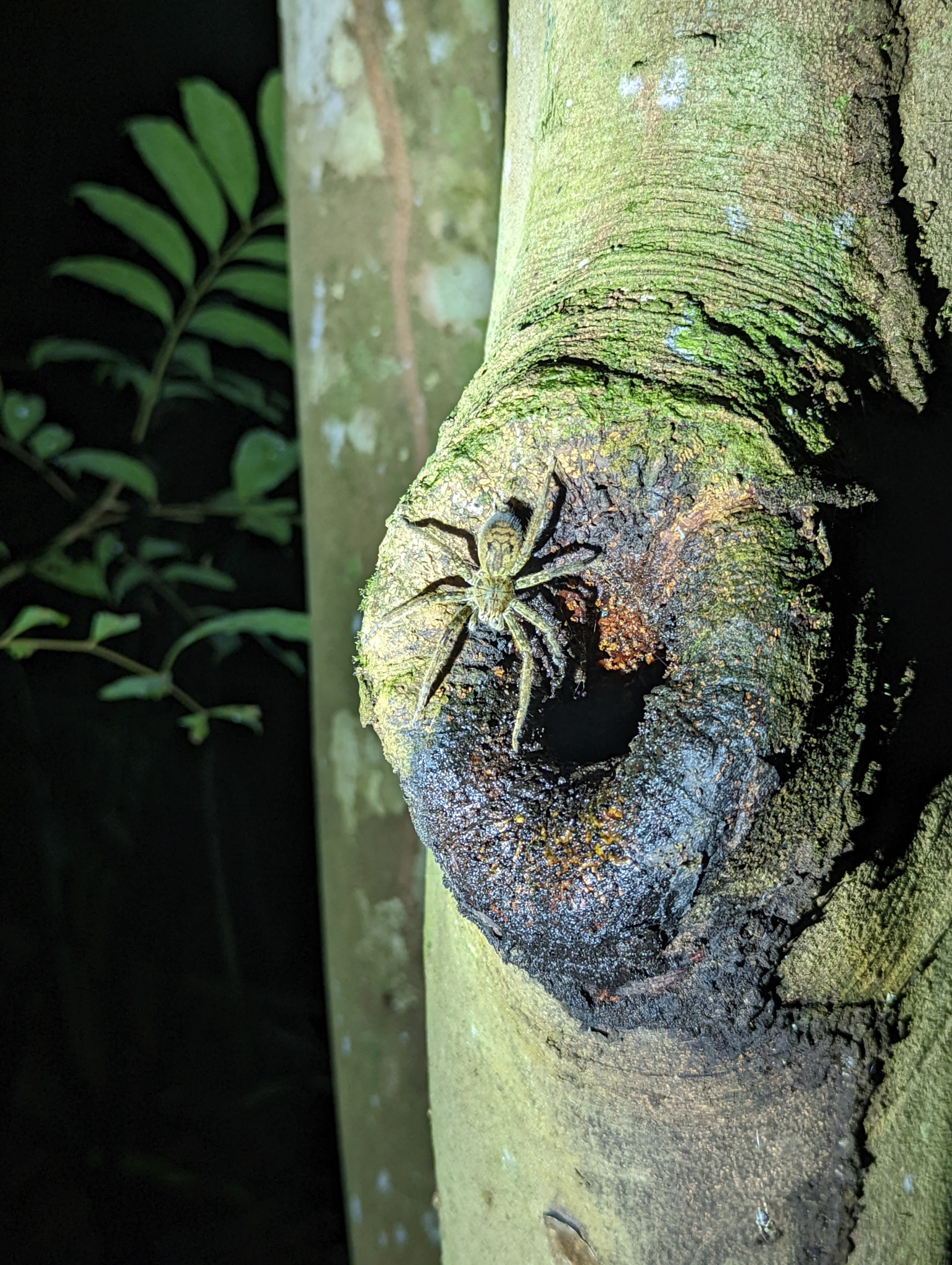
Red-thighed Bromeliad Spider
