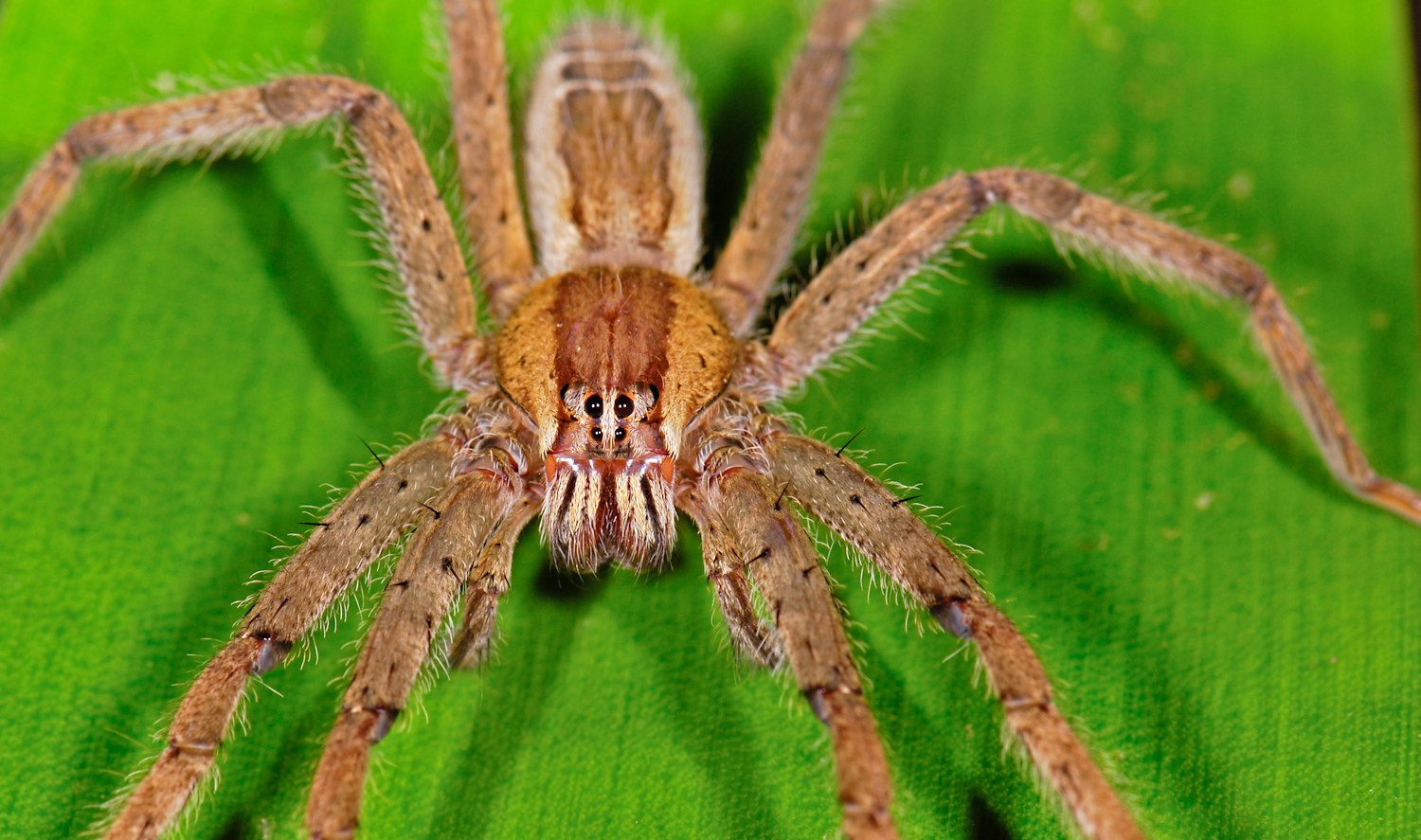

Scientific classification
- Kingdom: Animalia
- Phylum: Arthropoda
- Subphylum: Chelicerata
- Class: Arachnida
- Order: Araneae
- Infraorder: Araneomorphae
- Family: Trechaleidae
- Genus: Cupiennius
- Species: C. getazi

Binomial name
- Cupiennius getazi Simon

= Cupiennius getazi =

Species of spider

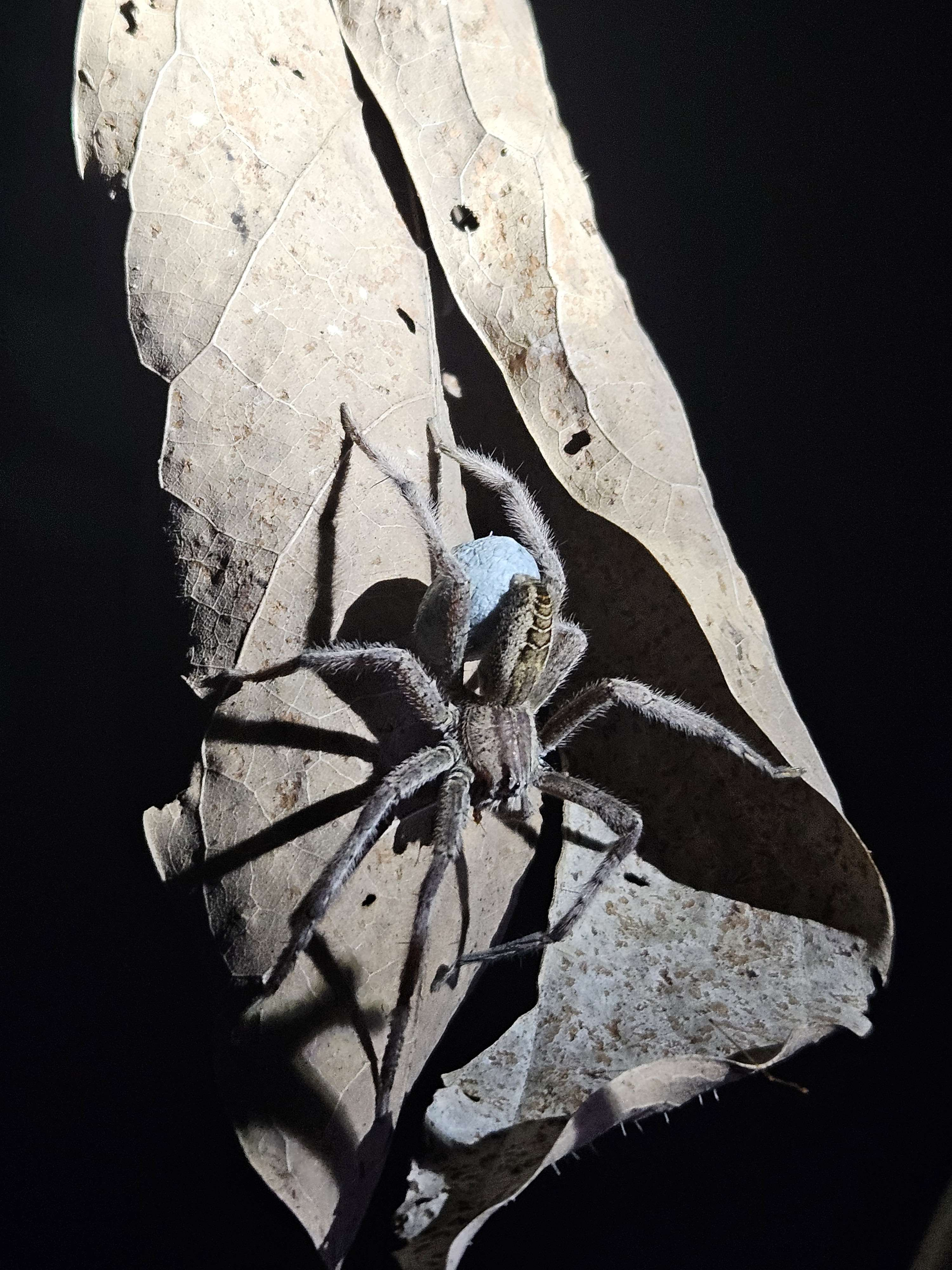
C. getazi standing on the inside of a folded over dead leaf cautiously defending her egg sack, taken at night with a flashlight on the spider, Lapa Verde, Costa Rica

Cupiennius getazi is a species from the genus Cupiennius known by the common name spot-legged bromeliad spider.

== Range ==
It may be found in Costa Rica and Panama, primarily on the eastern Atlantic side, more common in the lowlands. At southern end of range can be found around the Canal Zone of Panama.
