= Trechalea gertschi =

Scientific classification
- Domain: Eukaryota
- Kingdom: Animalia
- Phylum: Arthropoda
- Subphylum: Chelicerata
- Class: Arachnida
- Order: Araneae
- Infraorder: Araneomorphae
- Family: Trechaleidae
- Genus: Trechalea
- Species: T. gertschi

Binomial name
- Trechalea gertschi Carico & Minch, 1981

Species of spider

Trechalea gertschi, the long-legged water spider, is a species of true spider in the family Trechaleidae. It is found in the United States and Mexico.
