= Cupiennin =

Peptides from the venom of the wandering spider

Cupiennins are a group of small cytolytic peptides from the venom of the wandering spider Cupiennius salei. They are known to have high bactericidal, insecticidal and haemolytic activities. They are chemically cationic α-helical peptides. They were isolated and identified in 2002 as a family of peptides called cupiennin 1. The sequence was determined by a process called Edman degradation, and the family consists of cupiennin 1a, cupiennin 1b, cupiennin 1c, and cupiennin 1d. The amino acid sequences of cupiennin 1b, c, and d were obtained by a combination of sequence analysis and mass spectrometric measurements of comparative tryptic peptide mapping. Even though they are not strong toxins, they do enhance the effect of the spider venom by synergistically enhancing other components of the venom, such CSTX.

== Chemical property ==
All cupiennins are composed of 35 amino acid residues and are characterised by a more hydrophobic N-terminal chain region and a C-terminus composed preferentially of polar and charged residues. Their distinguishing feature is the absence of cysteine. On the basis of the absence or presence of proline, cupiennins are divided into two families cupiennin 1 family and cupiennin 2 family.

=== Cupiennin 1 family ===
Cupiennin 1 family is the more well-known group, and consists of at least four peptides, such as cupiennin 1a, 1b, 1c, and 1d. Cupiennin 1a (M-ctenitoxin-Cs1a) is the most abundant and has a molecular mass of 3798.63 Da. Cupiennin 1b is less abundant and has a size of 3800.25 Da. Cupiennin 1c (3769.75 Da) and 1d (3795.13) are in extremely low concentrations. These peptides are highly cationic, made up of similar amino acids, but different in the N- and C-terminal ends. The hydrophobic N-terminal is characterised by six repeats of four amino acids, which are in a conserved sequence: position 1 is always lysine; position 2 is variable; position 3 is always a hydrophobic amino acid or glycine, and in position 4 is either alanine or valine. All members have high antibacterial activity against Gram-positive as well as Gram-negative bacteria at a range of 0.16 to 5 mM concentration. They also exhibit a cytolytic activity between 14.5–24.4 mM on human erythrocytes. They also have antiprotozoal activity against Trypanosoma cruzi and malarial parasite. They are insecticidal, but not as strong as the CSTX-1, another peptide of the same venom. These properties are modulated by the N-terminus.

=== Cupiennin 2 family ===
Cupiennin 2 family is less well understood, but it also comprises at least four peptides. In fact, members of this family were discovered earlier in 1994 as member of the CSTX peptides. Upon the discovery of cupiennin 1 family, CSTX-3, -4, -5, and -6 are reclassified as cupiennins. This is because of their basic chemical similarities, such as the amino acid residues. They are characterised by the presence of at least one proline. Cupiennin 2a is the best studied. It has a molecular mass of 3701.05 Da, and shows weak cytolytic, bactericidal and insecticidal activities.
