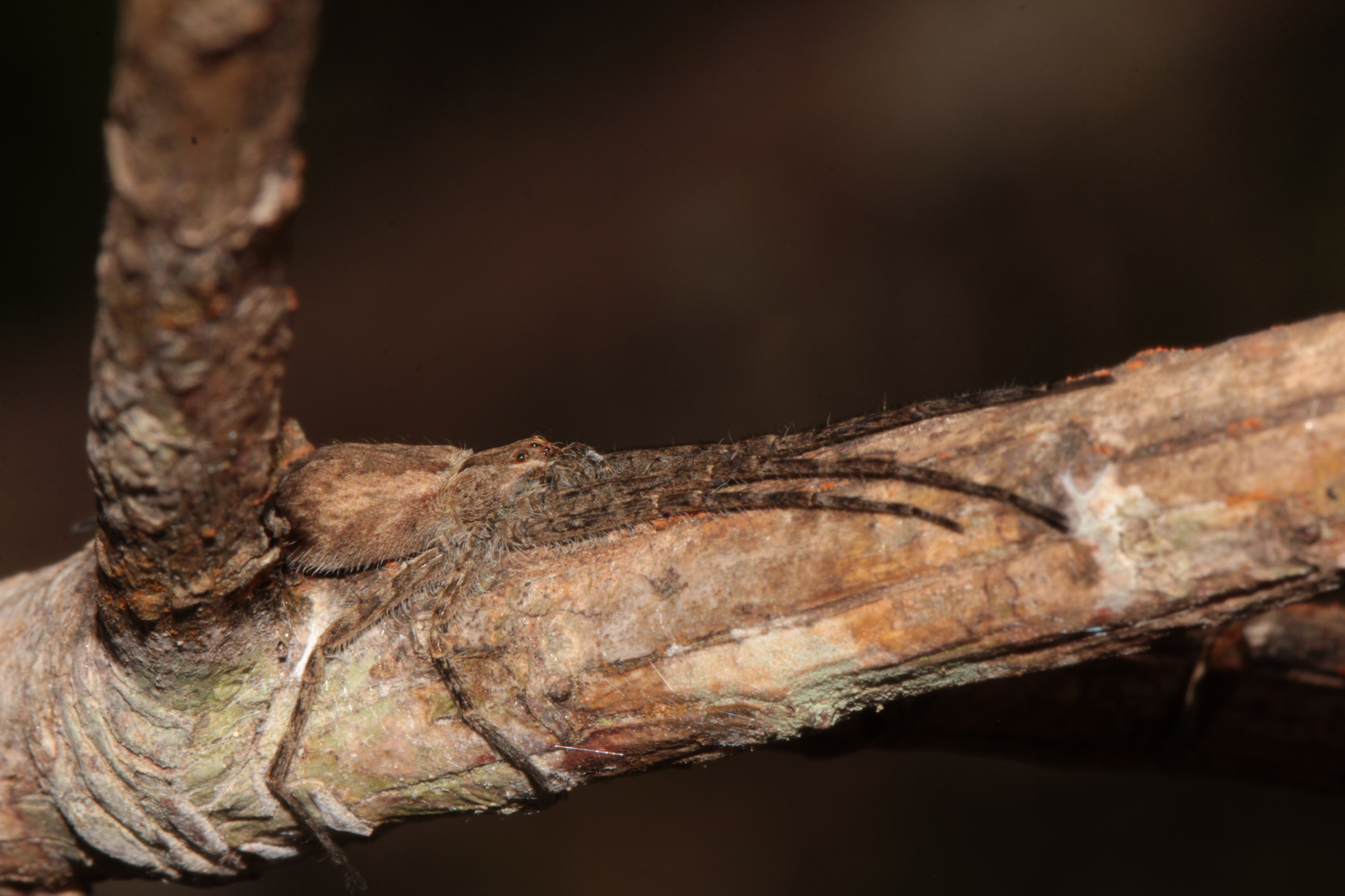
- Paradossenus longipes

Scientific classification
- Kingdom: Animalia
- Phylum: Arthropoda
- Subphylum: Chelicerata
- Class: Arachnida
- Order: Araneae
- Infraorder: Araneomorphae
- Family: Trechaleidae
- Genus: Paradossenus; Pickard-Cambridge

Type species
- Paradossenus longipes

Species
- 13, see text

= Paradossenus =

Genus of spiders

Paradossenus is a genus of spiders in the family Trechaleidae. It was first described in 1903 by F. O. Pickard-Cambridge. As of 2017, it contains 13 species.

== Species ==
Paradossenus comprises the following species:

- Paradossenus acanthocymbium Carico & Silva, 2010
- Paradossenus benicito Carico & Silva, 2010
- Paradossenus caricoi Sierwald, 1993
- Paradossenus corumba Brescovit & Raizer, 2000
- Paradossenus isthmus Carico & Silva, 2010
- Paradossenus longipes (Taczanowski, 1874)
- Paradossenus makuxi Silva & Lise, 2011
- Paradossenus minimus (Mello-Leitão, 1940)
- Paradossenus pozo Carico & Silva, 2010
- Paradossenus pulcher Sierwald, 1993
- Paradossenus sabana Carico & Silva, 2010
- Paradossenus santaremensis (Silva & Lise, 2006)
- Paradossenus tocantins Carico & Silva, 2010
