= Enna (spider) =

Scientific classification
- Domain: Eukaryota
- Kingdom: Animalia
- Phylum: Arthropoda
- Subphylum: Chelicerata
- Class: Arachnida
- Order: Araneae
- Infraorder: Araneomorphae
- Family: Trechaleidae
- Genus: Enna; O. Pickard-Cambridge, 1897

Type species
- Enna velox O. Pickard-Cambridge, 1897

Species
- 40, see text

Genus of spiders

Enna is a genus of South American and Central American araneomorph spiders in the family Trechaleidae, first described by Octavius Pickard-Cambridge in 1897.

== Species ==
Enna contains forty described species:

- Enna baeza Silva, Lise & Carico, 2008 — Ecuador, Peru
- Enna bartica Silva, Lise & Carico, 2008 — Brazil, Guyana
- Enna bonaldoi Silva, Lise & Carico, 2008 — Peru, Brazil
- Enna caliensis Silva, Lise & Carico, 2008 — Colombia, Bolivia
- Enna caparao Silva & Lise, 2009 — Brazil
- Enna caricoi Silva & Lise, 2011 — Colombia
- Enna carinata Silva & Lise, 2011 — Panama
- Enna chickeringi Silva, Lise & Carico, 2008 — Honduras, Costa Rica
- Enna colonche Silva, Lise & Carico, 2008 — Ecuador
- Enna eberhardi Silva, Lise & Carico, 2008 — Costa Rica, Panama
- Enna echarate Silva & Lise, 2009 — Peru
- Enna estebanensis (Simon, 1898) — Venezuela, Ecuador
- Enna frijoles Silva & Lise, 2011 — Panama
- Enna gloriae Rengifo, Albo & Delgado-Santa, 2020 —Colombia
- Enna hara Silva, Lise & Carico, 2008 — Peru
- Enna huanuco Silva, Lise & Carico, 2008 — Peru
- Enna igarape Silva, Lise & Carico, 2008 — Peru, Brazil
- Enna jullieni (Simon, 1898) — Panama, Colombia, Venezuela
- Enna junin (Carico & Silva, 2010) — Peru
- Enna kuyuwiniensis Silva, Lise & Carico, 2008 — Guyana
- Enna maya Silva, Lise & Carico, 2008 — Honduras, Costa Rica, Peru
- Enna meridionalis Silva & Lise, 2009 — Brazil
- Enna minor Petrunkevitch, 1925 — Panama, Colombia
- Enna moyobamba Silva, Víquez & Lise, 2012 — Peru
- Enna nesiotes Chamberlin, 1925 — Panama
- Enna osaensis Silva, Víquez & Lise, 2012 — Costa Rica
- Enna paraensis Silva, Lise & Carico, 2008 — Brazil
- Enna pecki Silva, Lise & Carico, 2008 — Costa Rica
- Enna redundans (Platnick, 1993) — Brazil
- Enna rioja Silva, 2013 — Peru
- Enna riotopo Silva, Lise & Carico, 2008 — Ecuador
- Enna rothi Silva, Lise & Carico, 2008 — Ecuador
- Enna segredo Silva & Lise, 2009 — Brazil
- Enna silvae Silva & Lise, 2011 — Peru
- Enna triste Silva & Lise, 2011 — Venezuela
- Enna trivittata Silva & Lise, 2009 — Peru, Brazil
- Enna velox O. Pickard-Cambridge, 1897 — Mexico
- Enna venezuelana Silva & Lise, 2011 — Venezuela
- Enna xingu Carico & Silva, 2010 — Brazil
- Enna zurqui Silva & Lise, 2011 — Costa Rica
