= Trechaleoides =

Scientific classification
- Domain: Eukaryota
- Kingdom: Animalia
- Phylum: Arthropoda
- Subphylum: Chelicerata
- Class: Arachnida
- Order: Araneae
- Infraorder: Araneomorphae
- Family: Trechaleidae
- Genus: Trechaleoides; Carico

Type species
- Trechaleoides keyserlingi

Species
- Trechaleoides biocellata (Mello-Leitão, 1926); Trechaleoides keyserlingi (F. O. Pickard-Cambridge, 1903)

Genus of spiders

Trechaleoides is a genus of spiders in the family Trechaleidae. It was first described in 2005 by Carico. As of 2017, it contains 2 species.
