= Cupiennius foliatus =

Scientific classification
- Domain: Eukaryota
- Kingdom: Animalia
- Phylum: Arthropoda
- Subphylum: Chelicerata
- Class: Arachnida
- Order: Araneae
- Infraorder: Araneomorphae
- Family: Trechaleidae
- Genus: Cupiennius
- Species: C. foliatus

Binomial name
- Cupiennius foliatus F. O. P.-Cambridge, 1901

Species of spider

Cupiennius foliatus is a banana spider species first documented in 1901 and found in Costa Rica and Panama.
