= Barrisca =

Scientific classification
- Kingdom: Animalia
- Phylum: Arthropoda
- Subphylum: Chelicerata
- Class: Arachnida
- Order: Araneae
- Infraorder: Araneomorphae
- Family: Trechaleidae
- Genus: Barrisca; Ivie

Type species
- Barrisca nannella

Species
- Barrisca kochalkai Platnick, 1978; Barrisca nannella Chamberlin & Ivie, 1936

Genus of spiders

Barrisca is a genus of spiders in the family Trechaleidae. It was first described in 1936 by Chamberlin & Ivie. As of 2017, it contains 2 species.
