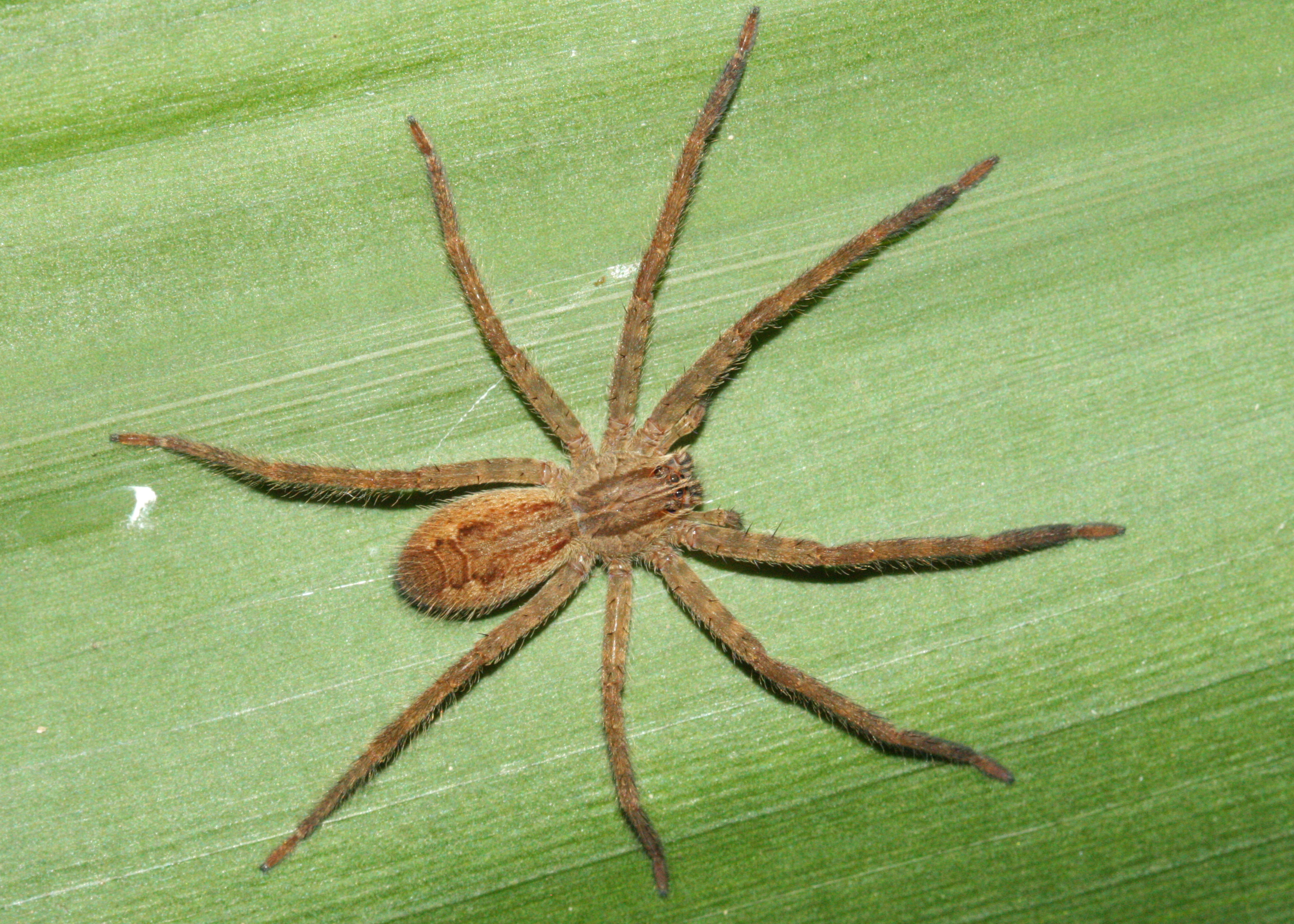
- Cupiennius salei juvenile in northern Honduras

Scientific classification
- Kingdom: Animalia
- Phylum: Arthropoda
- Subphylum: Chelicerata
- Class: Arachnida
- Order: Araneae
- Infraorder: Araneomorphae
- Family: Trechaleidae
- Genus: Cupiennius
- Species: C. salei

Binomial name
- Cupiennius salei Keyserling, 1877

Synonyms
- Ctenus salei Keyserling; Ancylometes ahrensi Lucas; Ctenus mordicus F.O.P.-Cambridge; Ctenus oculatus Simon; Cupiennius ahrensi Schmidt; Phoneutria oculifera Karsch

= Cupiennius salei =

Species of spider

Cupiennius salei, from the genus Cupiennius also commonly called the tiger bromeliad spider, which are large bodied, actively-hunting spiders that are part of the family Trechaleidae.

In the mid-1950s it was realised that the spider is an ideal model for biological research because of their large size, predictable behaviour, and ease of breeding in laboratories. From an initial 1963 publication on its biological characteristics, their venom has also become one of the most studied among spiders, which now known to include complex Neurotoxins, such as cupiennins and CSTX.

As with most spiders which also use venom to subdue prey, the bite of Cupiennius salei is not medically significant for humans, therefore they are not be considered dangerous. In particular, a peptide called CsTx-1 is highly potent for paralysing their prey which is mostly small insects.

They are visually similar to another group called wandering spiders (but also see that diverse kinds often get mistakenly called banana spiders).

== Description ==
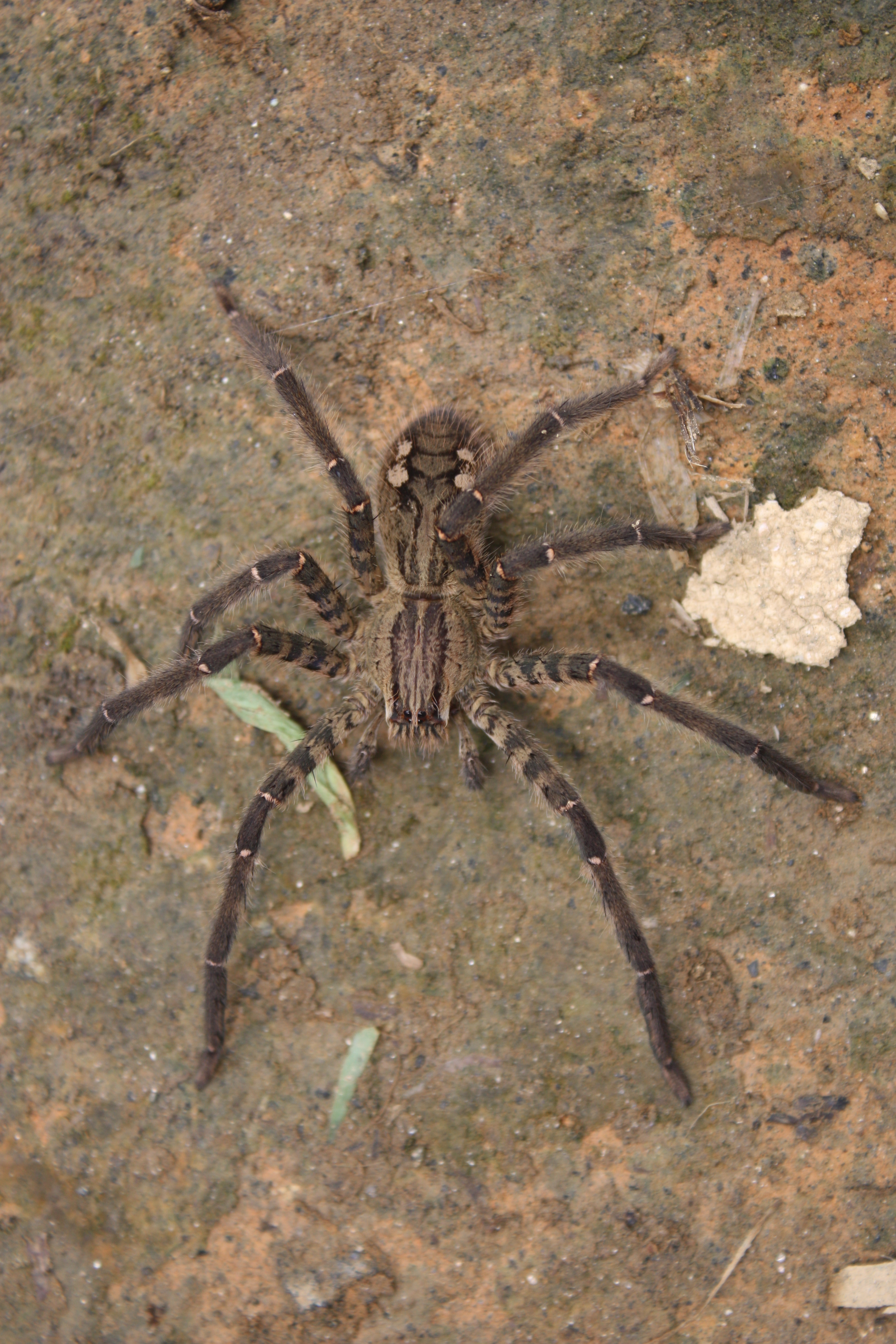
C. salei adult female from Parque Nacional Cusuco, Dept. Cortés, Honduras

Cupiennius salei is a large spider with distinct sexual dimorphism. The females are relatively larger than the males, measuring up to 3.5 cm in body length, with a 10 cm legspan. The dorsal side of the body is chocolate-brown with small, lighter spots on the abdomen and many darker longitudinal stripes, particularly on the carapace. The ventral side is red-orange with a thick black central region under the abdomen. Males measure up to 2.5 cm long and have very long and thin legs. The males are much lighter in colour than the females. They are distinct, with conspicuous palpal bulbs.

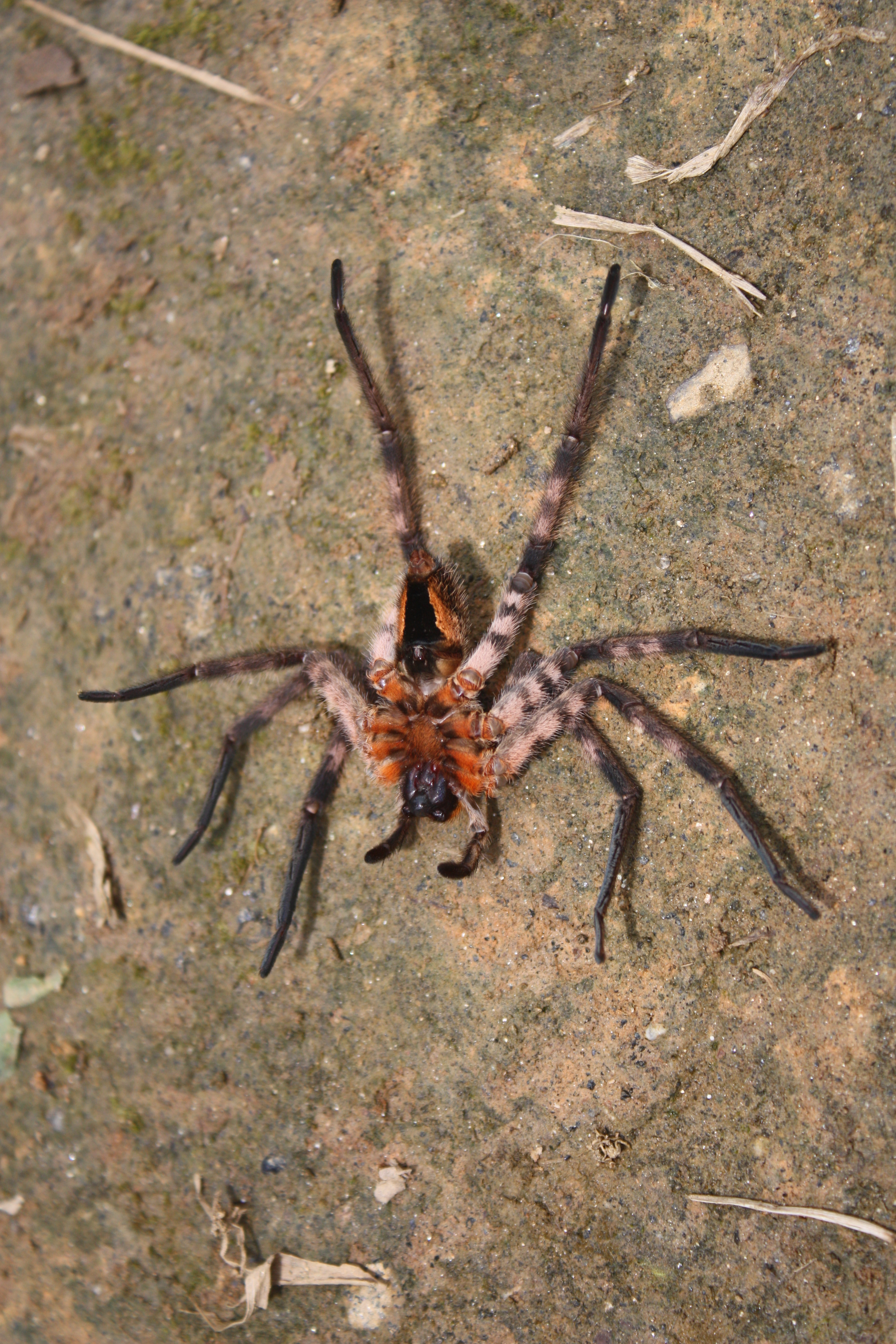
Adult female underside, from Honduras

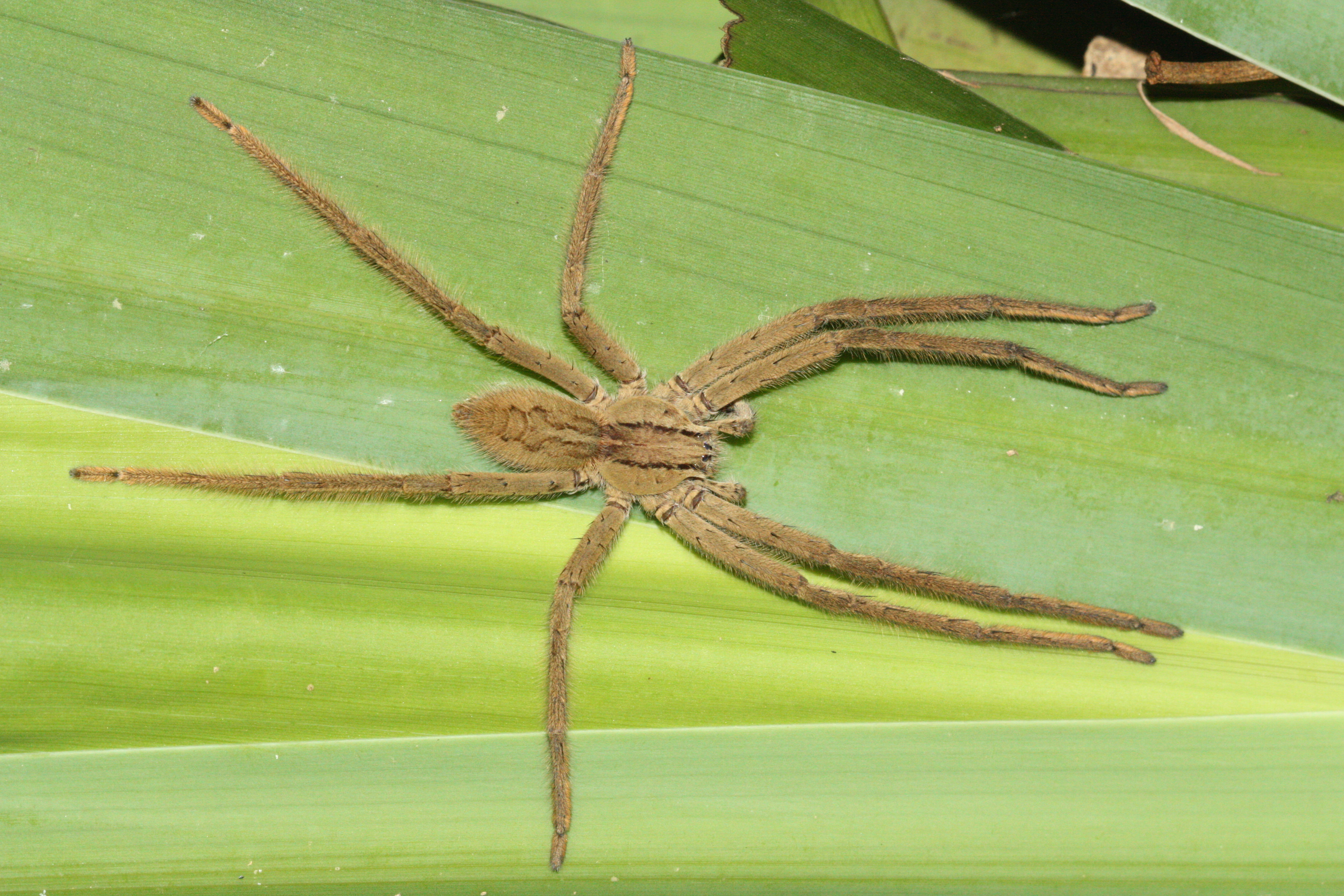
Adult male, resting on leaf, from Honduras

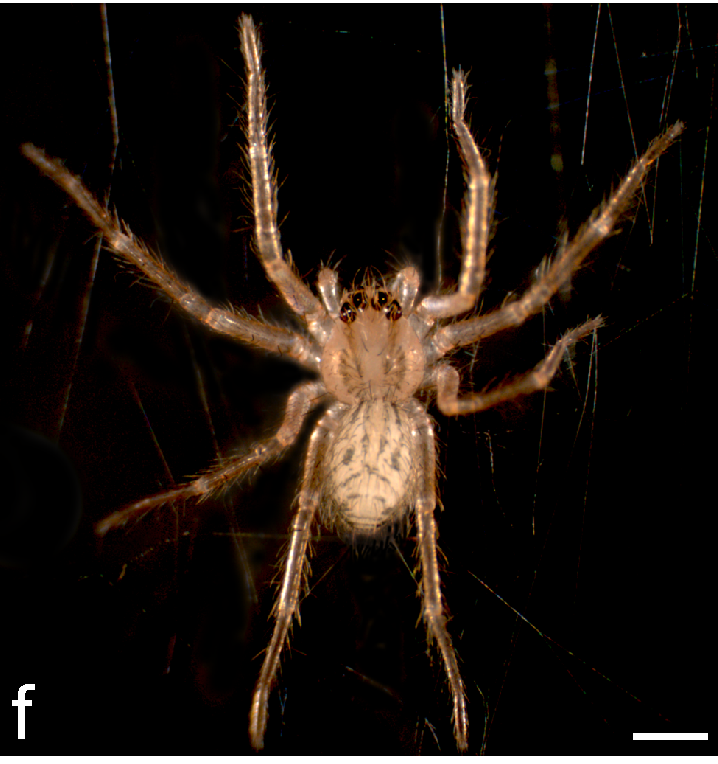
Second instar of C. salei (scale bar = 500 μm)

== Range ==
Cupiennius salei are found naturally across the northern parts of Central America and Mexico, while other species in the genus are also found in various parts of Central America and South America. More precisely, this species naturally occurs in Southeastern Mexico, Guatemala, Belize, Honduras, Nicaragua and possibly into northwestern Costa Rica. Yet, it has also been introduced to various parts of the world either by accidental imports (such as in the early 20th century from banana plantations), or deliberately introduced elsewhere as either a laboratory model organism or an exotic pet. However, it has not yet been recorded as established in the wild outside of its native Mexico and Central America.

== Habitat ==
Can be found in a wide variety of natural habitats but primarily moister broadleaf subtropical and tropical forests. However, they can also coexist close to human habitats in disturbed areas, where introduced plants such as bananas can provide ideal refuges. In general Cupiennius salei are largely arboreal, living in trees and bushes, often favoring plants with broad flat leaves and wide joints that provide shelter. Plants such as bananas and many bromeliads appear to provide ideal refuges, and the spiders can often be seen sheltering in the base of such plants where pools of water can provide protection. Although they tend to generally be inactive for long periods of time, often resting on the surfaces of broad leaves, they are capable of running fast when provoked, either to catch prey or to escape from threats.

== Ecology ==
Cupiennius salei is largely a nocturnal, "sit-and-wait" ambush predator behaving with a strong circadian rhythmicity. They hide during daylight, mostly under leaves, and emerge at dusk. At sunset, when the light intensity falls to about 15 lux, they leave their refuge but usually remain nearby. They remain there motionless for about 30 mins until it is dark (less than 0.1 lux) then move to the surface of the leaf and lie in-wait for prey, occasionally briefly walking about the leaf. Their activity is greatest during the first three hours of the night. They retreat back to their refuge after six to seven hours.

Under laboratory conditions, females make cocoons every three to four weeks, each containing up to 1,500 embryos. The embryo is typically 1.3 mm in diameter. The complete life cycle takes between 9 and 12 months from fertilized egg to mature adult. After hatching from the cocoon, the larvae start feeding. Generally they are fed first with fruit flies and later with crickets. They become reproductively mature after the final moult.

During courtship, Cupiennius salei communicate using sex pheromones. Females are usually solitary and to attract males, release the pheromones on trees along a silk thread. When a male detects the pheromone, he generates oscillatory movement that creates vibrations on the leaves (an average frequency of 76 Hz). The female responds to this by creating a counter vibration, and in this way guides the receptive male to her exact location. The female pheromone has been identified as (S)-1,1'-dimethyl citrate. The male's pheromone sensory cells are located in tip pore sensilla and respond to touching with either female silk or the synthetic compound of the pheromone.

Cupiennius salei have one pair of principal eyes and three pairs of secondary eyes located on the prosoma (the anterior end of the head) and they are colour blind. Being adapted to nocturnality, their visual capability is reduced and they rely on their tactile sensation to detect movements or vibrations in their environment.

== Venom ==
As Cupiennius salei does not produce any dedicated prey capture web, their bite effect plays an important part of their hunting strategy alongside grasping with the chelicerae, forelegs and pedipalps. Both ambush and pursuit are key parts of active prey capture. They prey on a wide range of invertebrates especially insects (moths, earwigs, cockroaches, flies, grasshoppers, etc), and small vertebrates such as frogs and lizards. Without any dedicated web for prey capture, they therefore depend entirely on body mechanics and venom for predation. They produce a neurotoxic venom which is composed of a complex mixture of at least 286 compounds and 49 novel proteins. In addition, there are many low molecular compounds, nine neurotoxic acting peptides (CSTX), at least eight neurotoxic and cytolytic acting peptides (collectively called cupiennins), highly active hyaluronidases. The most powerful neurotoxin is a peptide called CsTx-1. In 2002 a new family of peptides called cupiennins (cupiennin 1a, cupiennin 1b, cupiennin 1c, cupiennin 1d) was discovered from the venom, all composed of 35 amino acid residues, and have high antimicrobial activities. It was subsequently discovered that the cupiennins are broad-spectrum bioactive compounds having bactericidal, insecticidal and haemolytic activities.

They produce venom in a pair of cylindrical pouch-like glands located at the anterior end of the head (prosoma). In adult females, each gland measures 1.8 mm in diameter and 6.5 mm in length. The glands are connected to a small duct through which the venom is discharged via its fang-like chelicera. Just before entering the chelicera, the duct enlarges to a muscle-invested ampulla and then constricts again. This specific arrangement is believed to be the regulatory system on the amount of venom that is released.

The venom glands of Cupiennius salei store only about 10 μl of crude venom. Refilling of the glands takes 2–3 days and the lethal efficacy of the venom is very low for several days after envenomation, requiring 8 to 18 days to regain full effect. It has been determined that the amount of venom released differs between types of prey. For larger and stronger insects such as beetles, the spider uses the entire amount of its venom; for smaller prey, it uses only small amounts, thus economising use of the biologically costly venom.

== Etymology ==
The species was named after the species initial collector Auguste Sallé, who travelled across Mexico, and parts of Central and South America principally for making entomological collections, sent to Hugh Cuming, but is known for his Ornithology. Some of his Mexican collections are described by Sclater, 1857 plus memoires.
