= CSTX =

CSTX (for "Cupiennius salei toxins") is a name given to a group of closely related neurotoxic peptides present in the venom of the wandering spider Cupiennius salei. There are twenty types so far described for this protein group. However, some are reclassified into cupiennins group of toxin, including CSTX-3, -4, -5, and -6, because of their chemical affinity. The first thirteen were isolated and identified in 1994 by Lucia Kuhn-Nentwig, Johann Schaller, and Wolfgang Nentwig of the Zoological Institute at the University of Bern, Switzerland. The different types are most likely the products of splicing variant of the same gene. They are all L-type calcium channel blockers, and also exhibit cytolytic activity by forming an alpha-helix across the cell membrane in mammalian neurons. They also inhibit voltage-gated calcium channels in insect neurons.

== Types ==
The best understood members of the neurotoxin group of CSTX are:

Name	Recommended name	Size in Da	Amino acid residue	Toxicity (LD_{50}) on Drosophilla
CSTX-1	Omega-ctenitoxin-Cs1a	8,352	74	0.35 pmol/mg
CSTX-8	Toxin CSTX-8	7,378	63	
CSTX-9	U1-ctenitoxin-Cs1a	7,529	68	10.6 pmol/mg
CSTX-10	Toxin CSTX-10	8,110	69	
CSTX-11	Toxin CSTX-11	8,083	69	
CSTX-12	Toxin CSTX-12	7,312	63	
CSTX-13	U2-ctenitoxin-Cs1a	7,359	63	16.3 nmol/g
CSTX-14	Toxin CSTX-14	5,657	48	
CSTX-15	Toxin CSTX-15	5,612	48	
CSTX-16	Toxin CSTX-16	4,748	38	
CSTX-17	Toxin CSTX-17	4,410	14	
CSTX-18	Toxin CSTX-18	5,611	51	
CSTX-19	Toxin CSTX-19	3,748	35	
CSTX-20	Toxin CSTX-20	9,918	86	

== CSTX-1 ==
CSTX-1 is the most abundant peptide of the venom of C. salei with concentration ranging from 1.4 to 3.3 mM. It is the most toxic component, and is the principle neurotoxin of the spider. It is highly basic containing four disulfide bridges, which form 'disulfide through disulfide knot', thus, structurally defines this protein as a knottin. It has two natural degradation products, namely CSTX-2a and CSTX-2b, which occur in low amount and are less toxic than the CSTX-1 itself. CSTX-2a is composed of 61 amino acid residues and has a mass of 6864 Da, while CSTX-2b is made up of 60 amino acids having a size of 6708 Da. CSTX-2a is a variation of the same gene product, and it differs from CSTX-1 only on the last 13 amino acids of the C-terminal. The 13-amino acid terminal is unusually rich in lysine (7 in number) are attributed to the higher toxicity of CSTX-1. This makes CSTX-2a seven times less toxic than CSTX-1. Further, CSTX-2b also lacks arginine at position 61 compared to CSTX-1, and this reduces the neurotoxicity by 190-fold. CSTX-1 exerts two different functions: as a neurotoxin it inhibits L-type calcium channels, and as a cytolytic peptide it destroys the cell membrane.
