= Hesydrus =

Scientific classification
- Kingdom: Animalia
- Phylum: Arthropoda
- Subphylum: Chelicerata
- Class: Arachnida
- Order: Araneae
- Infraorder: Araneomorphae
- Family: Trechaleidae
- Genus: Hesydrus; Simon

Type species
- Hesydrus palustris

Species
- 7, see text

Genus of spiders

Hesydrus is a genus of spiders in the family Trechaleidae. It was first described in 1898 by Simon. As of 2017, it contains 7 Central and South American species.

== Species ==
Hesydrus comprises the following species:

- Hesydrus aurantius (Mello-Leitão, 1942)
- Hesydrus canar Carico, 2005
- Hesydrus caripito Carico, 2005
- Hesydrus chanchamayo Carico, 2005
- Hesydrus habilis (O. Pickard-Cambridge, 1896)
- Hesydrus palustris Simon, 1898
- Hesydrus yacuiba Carico, 2005
