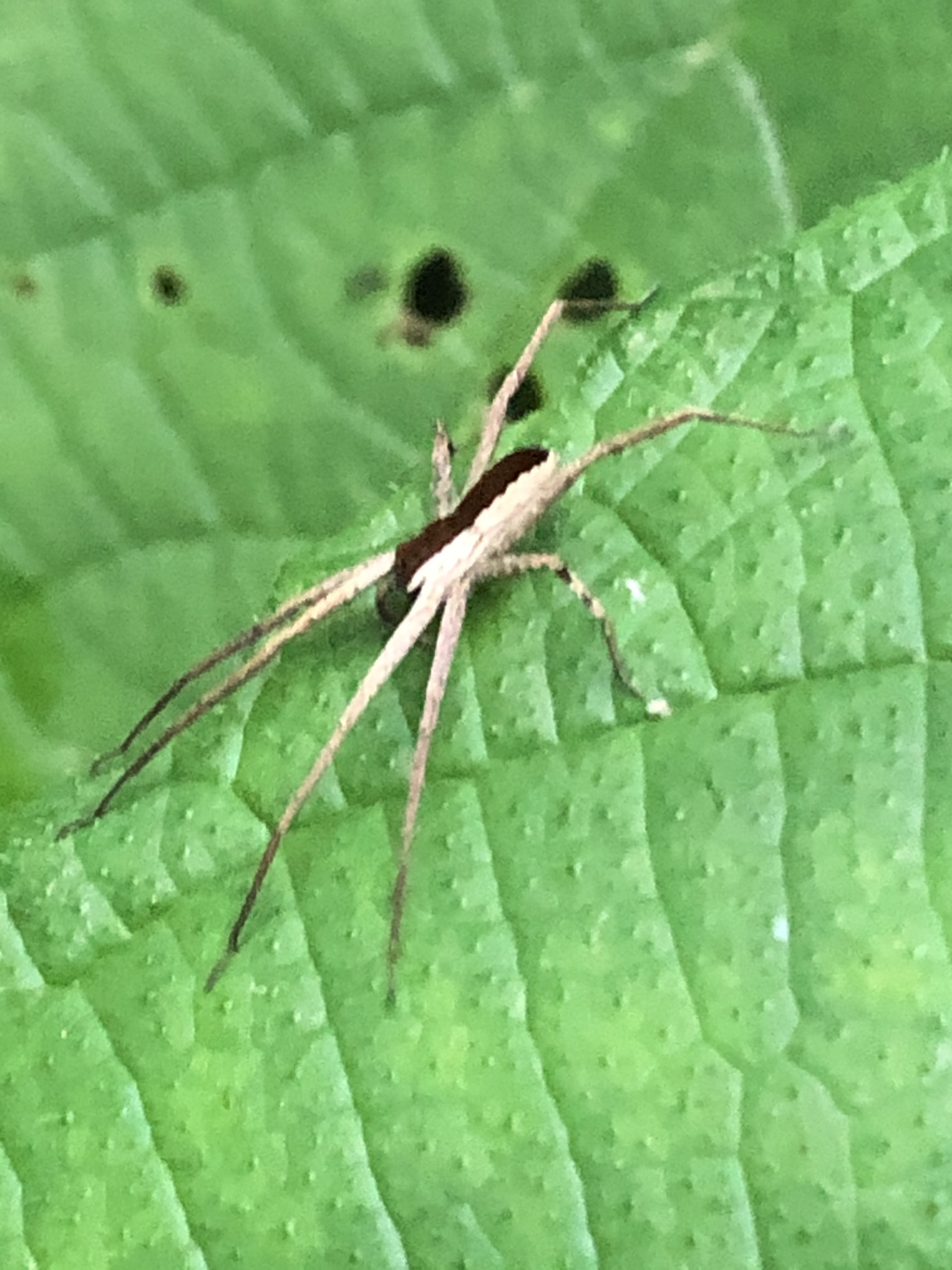
- Dossenus marginatus

Scientific classification
- Kingdom: Animalia
- Phylum: Arthropoda
- Subphylum: Chelicerata
- Class: Arachnida
- Order: Araneae
- Infraorder: Araneomorphae
- Family: Trechaleidae
- Genus: Dossenus; Simon

Type species
- Dossenus marginatus

Species
- Dossenus guapore Silva, Lise & Carico, 2007; Dossenus marginatus Simon, 1898; Dossenus paraensis Silva & Lise, 2011

= Dossenus =

Genus of spiders

Dossenus is a genus of spiders in the family Trechaleidae. It was first described in 1898 by Simon. As of 2017, it contains 3 species.

== Etymology ==
Dossenus was a monster from Roman theatre. It was a hybrid of human and animal and was portrayed as one who would eat and chomp its way through anything. The name Dossenus roughly translates to "ever-chomping" in English.
