= Dyrines =

Scientific classification
- Kingdom: Animalia
- Phylum: Arthropoda
- Subphylum: Chelicerata
- Class: Arachnida
- Order: Araneae
- Infraorder: Araneomorphae
- Family: Trechaleidae
- Genus: Dyrines; Simon

Type species
- Dyrines striatipes

Species
- Dyrines brescoviti Silva & Lise, 2010; Dyrines ducke Carico & Silva, 2008; Dyrines huanuco Carico & Silva, 2008; Dyrines striatipes (Simon, 1898)

Genus of spiders

Dyrines is a genus of spiders in the family Trechaleidae. It was first described in 1903 by Simon. As of 2017, it contains 4 species, from South America and from Panama.
