= Rhoicinus =

Scientific classification
- Kingdom: Animalia
- Phylum: Arthropoda
- Subphylum: Chelicerata
- Class: Arachnida
- Order: Araneae
- Infraorder: Araneomorphae
- Family: Trechaleidae
- Genus: Rhoicinus; Simon

Type species
- Rhoicinus gaujoni

Species
- 10, see text

Genus of spiders

Rhoicinus is a genus of spiders in the family Trechaleidae. It was first described in 1898 by Simon. As of 2017, it contains 10 species, all from South America.

== Species ==
Rhoicinus comprises the following species:

- Rhoicinus andinus Exline, 1960
- Rhoicinus fuscus (Caporiacco, 1947)
- Rhoicinus gaujoni Simon, 1898
- Rhoicinus lugato Höfer & Brescovit, 1994
- Rhoicinus rothi Exline, 1960
- Rhoicinus schlingeri Exline, 1960
- Rhoicinus urucu Brescovit & Oliveira, 1994
- Rhoicinus wallsi Exline, 1950
- Rhoicinus wapleri Simon, 1898
- Rhoicinus weyrauchi Exline, 1960
