= Trechalea =

- Trechalea bucculenta, Cristalino River, Mato Grosso

Scientific classification
- Kingdom: Animalia
- Phylum: Arthropoda
- Subphylum: Chelicerata
- Class: Arachnida
- Order: Araneae
- Infraorder: Araneomorphae
- Family: Trechaleidae
- Genus: Trechalea; Thorell, 1869

Genus of spiders

Trechalea is a genus of spiders in the family Trechaleidae. The species of this genus are found in the New World from the United States south to Peru and Brazil.

== Taxonomy ==
The genus was first erected by Carl L. Koch in 1848, and given the name Triclaria. However, this name was already in use for a genus of parrots, and in 1869, Tord T.T. Thorell proposed the replacement name Trechalea. The name is derived from the Greek τρηχαλέος, meaning "rough" or "savage".

=== Species ===
As of March 2016, the World Spider Catalog accepted the following species:

- Trechalea amazonica F. O. Pickard-Cambridge, 1903 – Trinidad, Colombia, Brazil
- Trechalea bucculenta (Simon, 1898) – Colombia, Brazil, Argentina, Bolivia
- Trechalea connexa (O. Pickard-Cambridge, 1898) – Mexico
- Trechalea extensa (O. Pickard-Cambridge, 1896) – Mexico to Panama
- Trechalea gertschi Carico & Minch, 1981 – USA, Mexico
- Trechalea longitarsis (C. L. Koch, 1847) (type species) – Colombia, Ecuador, Peru
- Trechalea macconnelli Pocock, 1900 – Ecuador, Peru, Brazil, Guyana, Suriname
- Trechalea paucispina Caporiacco, 1947 – Peru, Brazil, Guyana
- Trechalea tirimbina Silva & Lapinski, 2012 – Costa Rica
