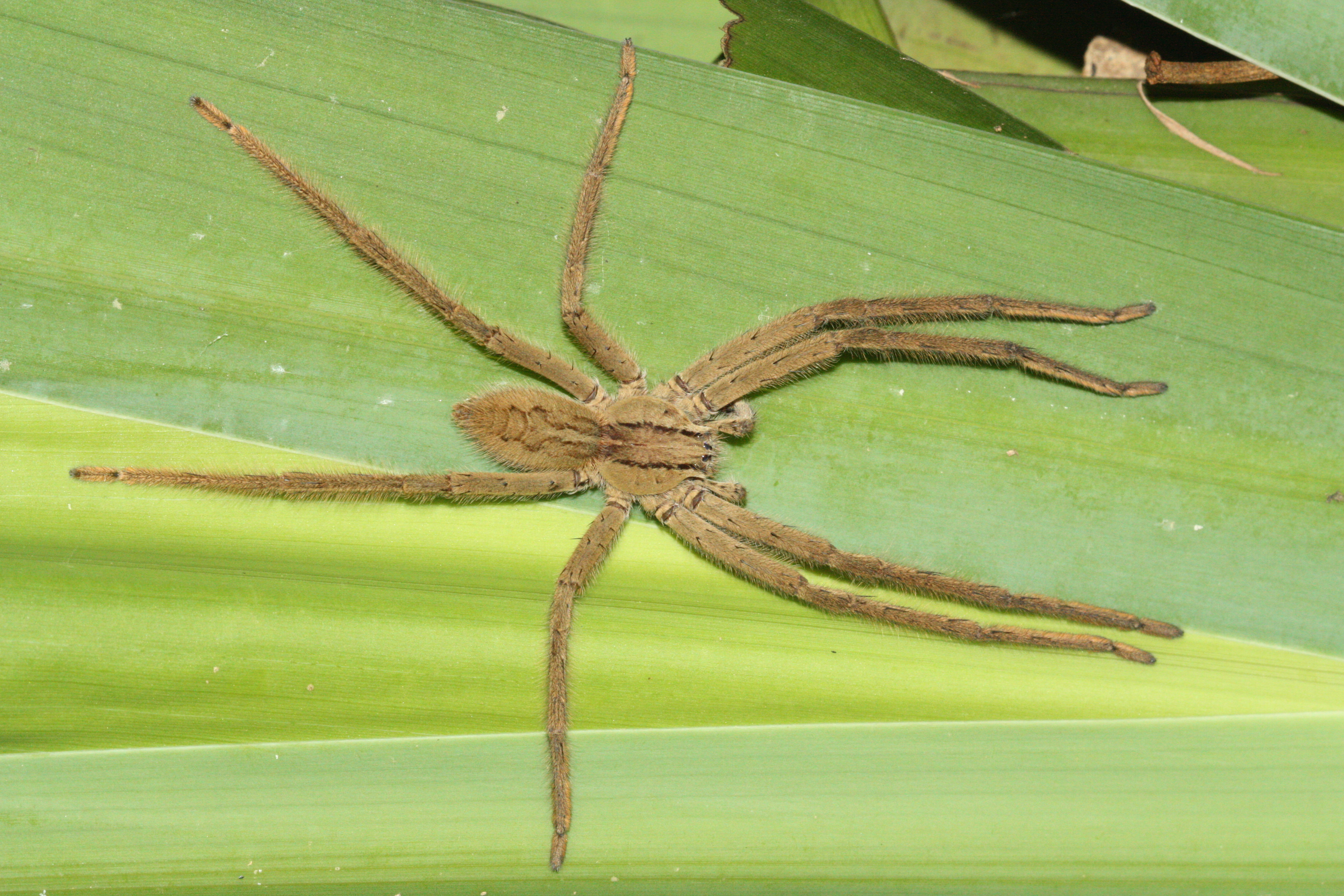
- Adult male Cupiennius salei in northern Honduras

Scientific classification
- Kingdom: Animalia
- Phylum: Arthropoda
- Subphylum: Chelicerata
- Class: Arachnida
- Order: Araneae
- Infraorder: Araneomorphae
- Family: Trechaleidae
- Genus: Cupiennius; Simon, 1891

Type species
- C. getazi Simon, 1891

Species
- 11, see text

= Cupiennius =

Genus of spiders

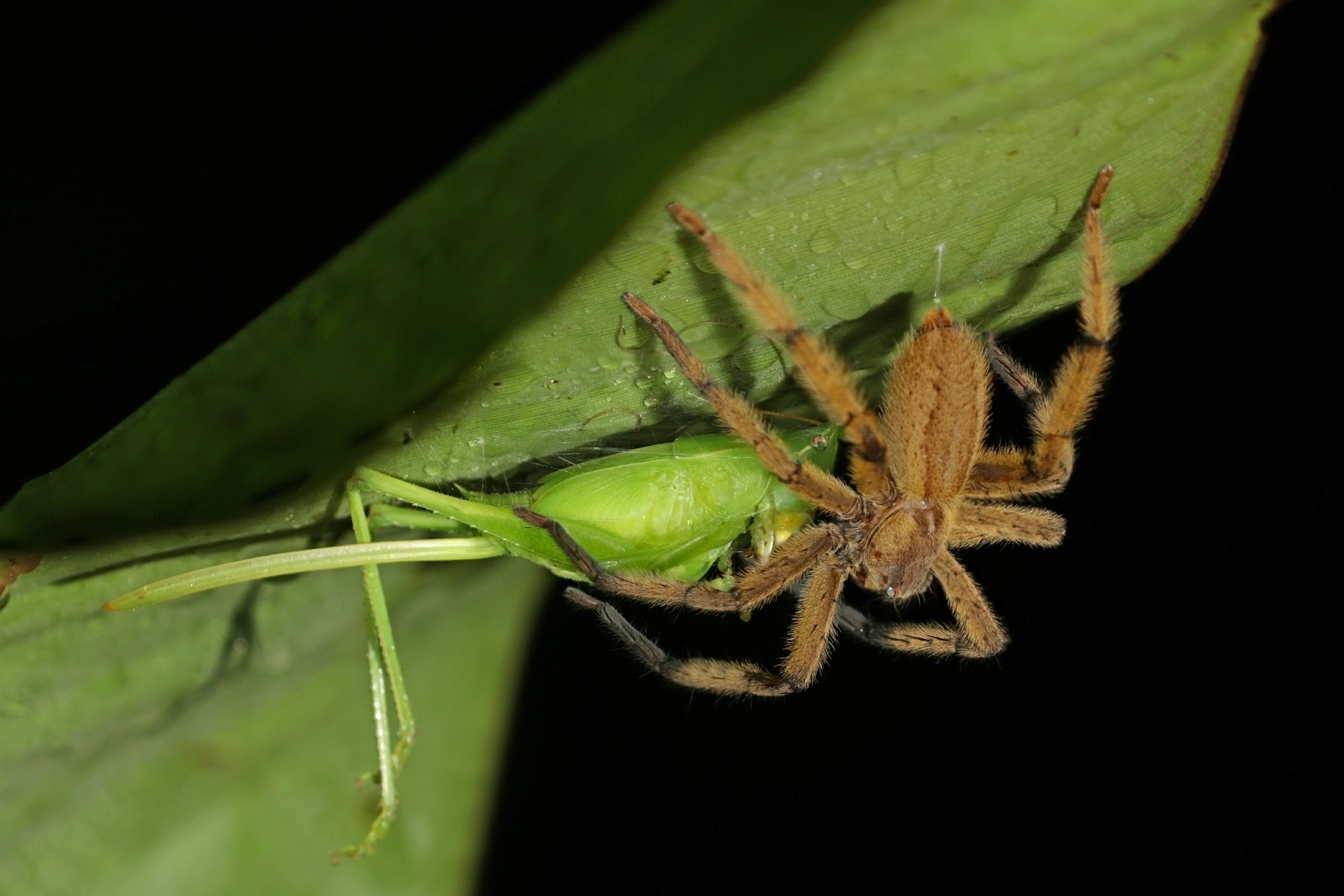
C. getazi with female katydid prey (Tettigoniidae sp.), Panama

Cupiennius, known by the common name bromeliad spiders or as the often confused name banana spiders, is a genus of araneomorph spiders in the family Trechaleidae, named by Eugène Simon in 1891. They are found from Mexico to northwestern South America, and on some Caribbean islands. Unlike the dangerously venomous Phoneutria, bites from these spiders typically have only minor effects on humans, and have been compared to a bee sting.

Members of this genus come in a range of sizes, from cephalothorax lengths less than 9 mm (0.35 in) to large species, with a cephalothorax length of 40 mm (1.6 in). The larger species are sometimes found far outside their native ranges in shipments of fruits, where they are frequently confused with Phoneutria spiders.

== Description ==
These spiders hide during the day, then come out to hunt during the night. They usually hide in particular plants, usually in bromeliads, agaves, and the banana family. They are medium to large spiders, and are usually a grey, brown or orange color. Sometimes owning a striped pattern. They have relatively longer legs than their bodies.

== Retreat ==
These spiders hide during the day, then come out to hunt during the night. They are quite specific with their retreats. They usually hide in bromeliads, agaves and the banana family. If these leaves are exposed, they would usually stick together leaves or make tunnels by bending or rolling up leaves and pasting them with silk. The inside of the retreat is usually more humid than the outside during the day, usually being at 90% humidity, as drying up is a considerable risk for them.

== Hunting ==
They hunt at night, venturing out of their retreats to stalk prey on leaves. They do this in what we consider total darkness. Although they have advanced eyes they primarily sense prey by detecting minute vibrations, which they may feel up to several meters away. Vibrations are sensed by specialized organs called metatarsal lyriform organs, which are located in the metatarsus of the two front legs. These organs consist of tiny slits, which are parallel to one another, looking like a lyre. When the tarsus is moved by the vibration, they compress, which stimulates the nervous system.

== Courtship ==
These spiders have a unique courtship system. Once it's time to breed the female will leave a dragline made of silk, wherever she walks to. Once the male recognizes the thread of the female, it will start sending vibrations to the plant the string was found on. Being distinct to each species. If the females replies, the male will follow the vibrations to the female.

== Species ==
As of April 2019 it contains eleven species:

- Cupiennius bimaculatus (Taczanowski, 1874) – Colombia, Venezuela, Brazil, Guyana, Ecuador
- Cupiennius chiapanensis Medina, 2006 – Mexico
- Cupiennius coccineus F. O. Pickard-Cambridge, 1901 – Costa Rica to Colombia
- Cupiennius cubae Strand, 1909 – Cuba, Costa Rica to Venezuela
- Cupiennius foliatus F. O. Pickard-Cambridge, 1901 – Costa Rica, Panama
- Cupiennius getazi Simon, 1891 (type) – Costa Rica, Panama
- Cupiennius granadensis (Keyserling, 1877) – Costa Rica to Colombia
- Cupiennius remedius Barth & Cordes, 1998 – Guatemala
- Cupiennius salei (Keyserling, 1877) – Mexico, Central America, Hispaniola
- Cupiennius valentinei (Petrunkevitch, 1925) – Panama
- Cupiennius vodou Brescovit & Polotow, 2005 – Hispaniola
