= Caricelea =

Scientific classification
- Domain: Eukaryota
- Kingdom: Animalia
- Phylum: Arthropoda
- Subphylum: Chelicerata
- Class: Arachnida
- Order: Araneae
- Infraorder: Araneomorphae
- Family: Trechaleidae
- Genus: Caricelea; Lise

Type species
- Caricelea wayrapata

Species
- Caricelea apurimac Silva & Lise, 2009; Caricelea camisea Silva & Lise, 2009; Caricelea wayrapata Silva & Lise, 2007

Genus of spiders

Caricelea is a genus of spiders in the family Trechaleidae. It was first described in 2007 by Silva & Lise. As of 2017, it contains 3 species, all from Peru.
