= Amapalea =

Scientific classification
- Domain: Eukaryota
- Kingdom: Animalia
- Phylum: Arthropoda
- Subphylum: Chelicerata
- Class: Arachnida
- Order: Araneae
- Infraorder: Araneomorphae
- Family: Trechaleidae
- Genus: Amapalea; Silva & Lise, 2006
- Species: A. brasiliana

Binomial name
- Amapalea brasiliana Silva & Lise, 2006

Genus of spiders

Amapalea is a monotypic genus of spiders in the family Trechaleidae. It was first described by Silva & Lise in 2006. As of 2023, it contains only one species, Amapalea brasiliana found in Brazil.
