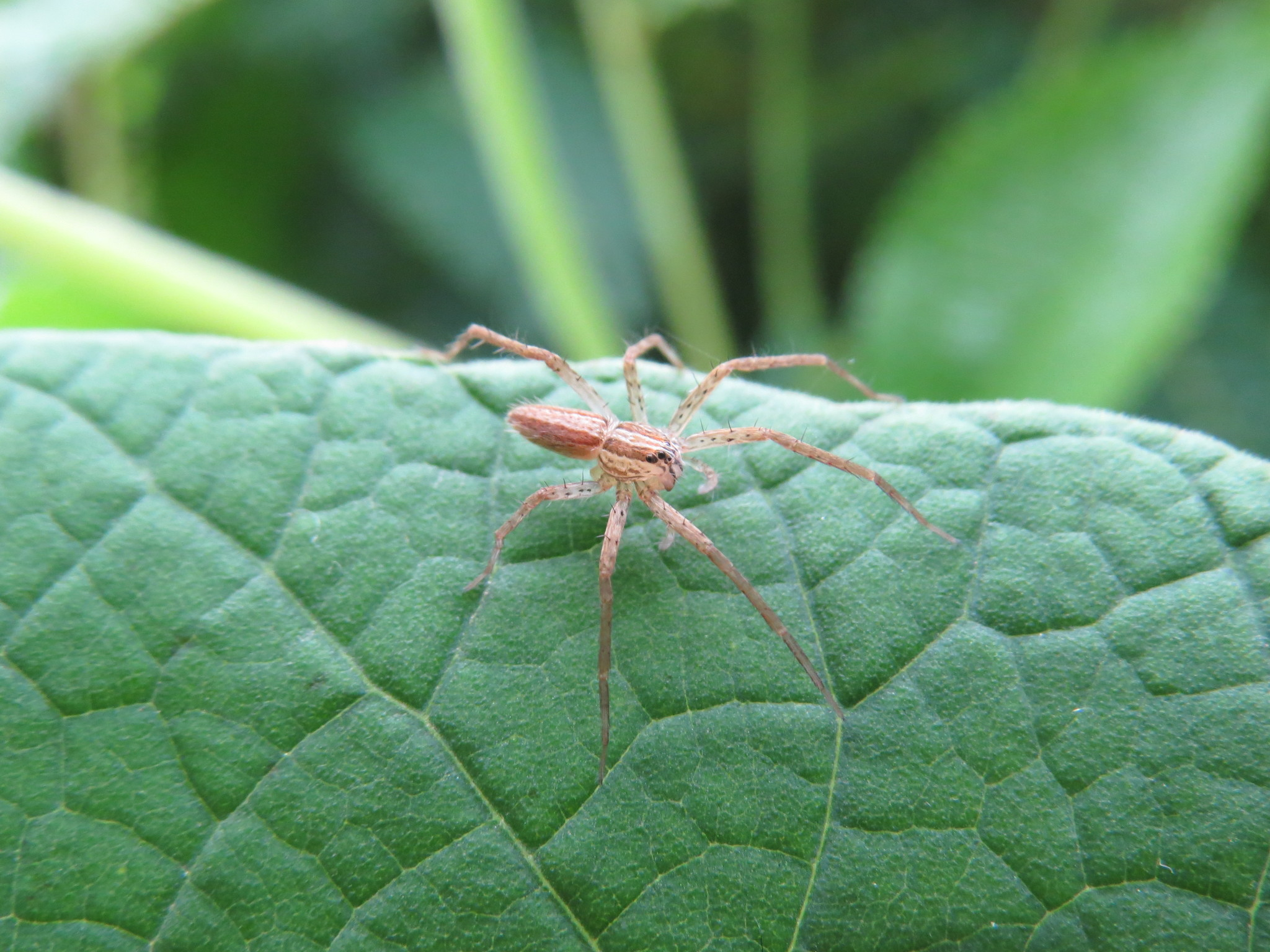
- Neoctenus comosus

Scientific classification
- Kingdom: Animalia
- Phylum: Arthropoda
- Subphylum: Chelicerata
- Class: Arachnida
- Order: Araneae
- Infraorder: Araneomorphae
- Family: Trechaleidae
- Genus: Neoctenus; Simon

Type species
- Neoctenus comosus

Species
- Neoctenus comosus Simon, 1897; Neoctenus eximius Mello-Leitão, 1938; Neoctenus finneganae Mello-Leitão, 1948; Neoctenus peruvianus (Chamberlin, 1916)

= Neoctenus =

Genus of spiders

Neoctenus is a genus of spiders in the family Trechaleidae. It was first described in 1897 by Simon. As of 2017, it contains 4 South American species.
