= Paratrechalea =

Scientific classification
- Kingdom: Animalia
- Phylum: Arthropoda
- Subphylum: Chelicerata
- Class: Arachnida
- Order: Araneae
- Infraorder: Araneomorphae
- Family: Trechaleidae
- Genus: Paratrechalea; Carico

Type species
- Paratrechalea ornata

Species
- 7, see text

Genus of spiders

Paratrechalea is a genus of spiders in the family Trechaleidae. It was first described in 2005 by Carico. As of 2017, it contains 7 species from Brazil, Argentina, Uruguay.

== Habitat ==
Paratrechalea azul and Paratrechalea ornata are nocturnal and found on boulders at the edge of streams in Brazil, Uruguay, and Argentina. In Minas, Uruguay, the climate is stable. However, in Queguay, Uruguay, El Niño-Southern Oscillations impacts the rainfall, which creates variations in climate. There are unpredictable environmental conditions.

== Species ==
Paratrechalea comprises the following species:

- Paratrechalea azul Carico, 2005
- Paratrechalea galianoae Carico, 2005
- Paratrechalea julyae Silva & Lise, 2006
- Paratrechalea longigaster Carico, 2005
- Paratrechalea ornata (Mello-Leitão, 1943)
- Paratrechalea saopaulo Carico, 2005
- Paratrechalea wygodzinskyi (Soares & Camargo, 1948)

== Species Divergence ==
P. azul and P. ornata are phenotypically similar and one of the ways to distinguish between species is their genitalia. Sexual selection is the driver of genitalia diversity. Also, there can be intraspecific and interspecific divergence that influences genitalia diversity. Intraspecific divergences deals with variation within the same species. Interspecific divergences is the variation between different species. In P. ornata species, there is a clear intraspecific divergence in genitalia shape morphology between the Uruguayan and Brazilian populations; there is a morphological interspecific divergence in P. azul, P. ornata, and P. galianoae.

There are reproductive conflicts within and between P. azul and P. ornata. P. azul males mistakenly mate with heterospecific (from a different species) females at a higher rate than P. ornata males. However, P. ornata males tend to be preyed upon and lose their nuptial gift more often when encountering a heterospecific female.

== Reproductive Cycle ==
The P. ornata have two reproductive periods: March to June and September to December, males offer a nuptial gift and court on the stream edge. In Brazil, P. azul and P. ornata, their reproductive season overlaps from October to February. These two species tend to mate with each other because they phenotypically look similar to each other. Females provide silk for males, the females pheromones attract males, the males use the silk to wrap a nutritious nuptial gift.

== Mating Behaviors ==
=== Dimorphisms ===
The chelicerae of female and male in Paratrechalea spiders are shown to have a size and color dimorphism, which can be due to male courtship signaling. The chelicerae trait is shown to be a male-biased sexual trait when compared to the female chelicerae size.

=== Nuptial gifts ===
Paratrechalea are in the Trechaleidae family. The males in the Trechaleidae and Pisauridae families provide nuptial gifts during mating. Sexual selection favors nuptial gifts as it provides females direct benefits. P. azul, P. ornata, and P. galianoae have all shown to provide a nuptial gift. Female silk is used by males to create nuptial gift, the silk has pheromones that attract males. Chemical cues are important to distinguish the sex in order to increase their chances of mating. Female attraction to nuptial gifts with elaborate silk wrapping could have led the for worthless gift-giving. Recently the genus Paradossenus, the species P. longpies have demonstrated to wrap a nuptial gift both in the lab and field. There are males that spend more time wrapping worthless gifts, even when there are nutritious prey that could be wrapped. The evolution of worthless gift wrapping might be condition or resource dependent.

Although the chelicerae serves as an intersexual signaler, it is a functional trait for prey capture. Females gain direct benefits when mating with males that provide nuptial gifts. Direct benefits consist of a male providing food, territory, or resources for the female in order to increase their chances to mate. However, in P. ornata species, males provide a nuptial gift that can be either be nutritive or worthless. Males that provide worthless gifts enhance their mating success by transferring more sperm. Males adjust their gift type when there is sperm competition risk. Moreover, male size and gift type impact mating duration, which increases female spiderlings. Female receptivity varies with age. Young females invest more time foraging and maturing, while older females are more receptive to mate. Older females tend to accept more gifts, however, there was no difference between young and older females in the latency to accept a gift. Although females are regarded as the choosier sex, P. ornata males have shown to be selective with whom they mate; males tend to mate with good condition females. The quality of the gift varies depending on the condition of the female.

There are many hypotheses that try to explain why nuptial gifting spiders even provide a gift to females, such as mating effort hypothesis, sexual cannibalism, and parental investment. In P. ornata, there is a strong support for the male effort hypothesis, which highlights that males are more in control over mating duration and females ability to remate, higher mating success, and ability to transfer more sperm.
