= Heidrunea =

Scientific classification
- Domain: Eukaryota
- Kingdom: Animalia
- Phylum: Arthropoda
- Subphylum: Chelicerata
- Class: Arachnida
- Order: Araneae
- Infraorder: Araneomorphae
- Family: Trechaleidae
- Genus: Heidrunea; Höfer

Type species
- Heidrunea irmleri

Species
- Heidrunea arijana Brescovit & Höfer, 1994; Heidrunea irmleri Brescovit & Höfer, 1994; Heidrunea lobrita Brescovit & Höfer, 1994

Genus of spiders

Heidrunea is a genus of spiders in the family Trechaleidae. It was first described in 1994 by Brescovit & Höfer. As of 2017, it contains 3 species, all from Brazil.
