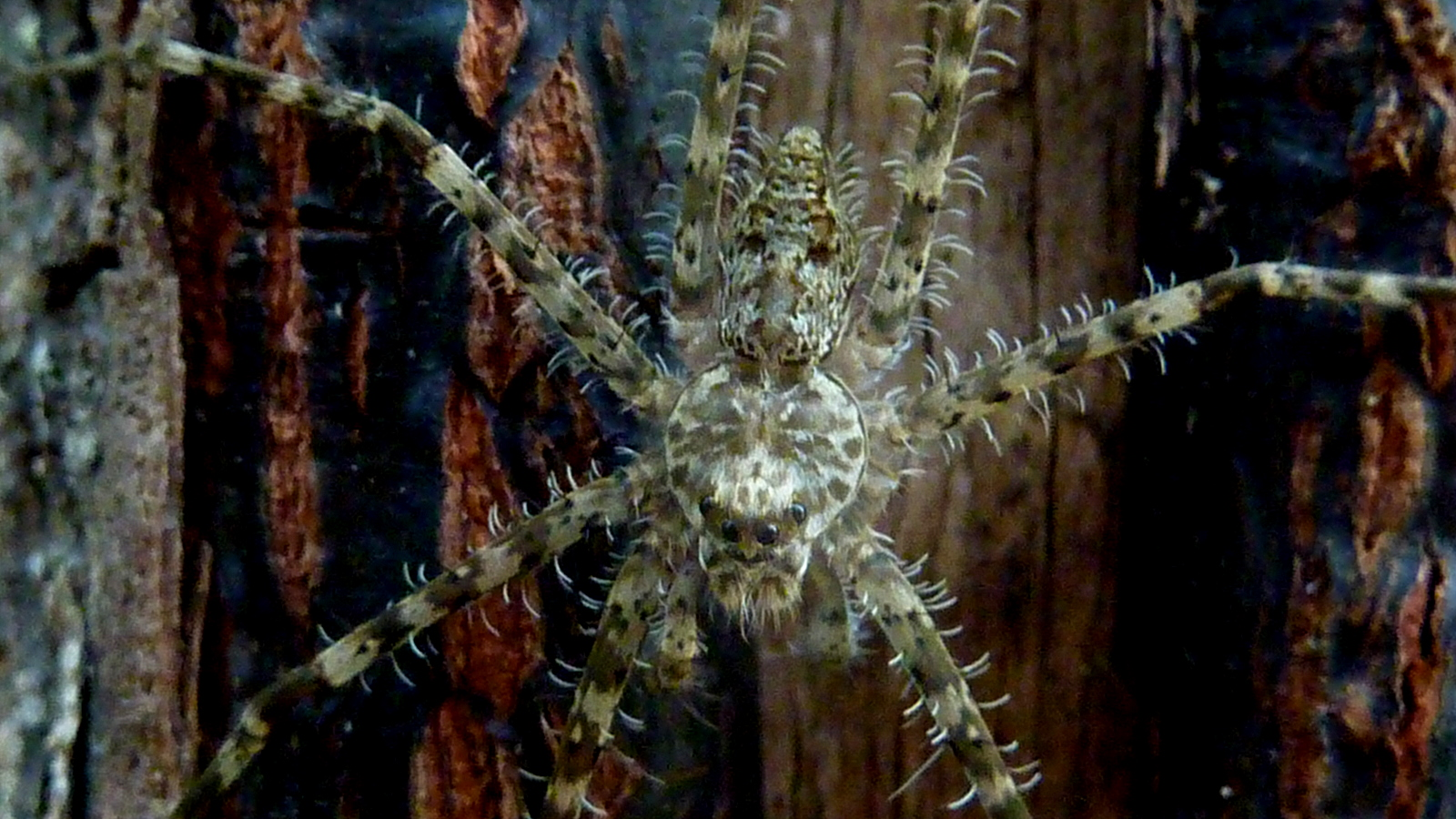
- Syntrechalea sp. in Brazil

Scientific classification
- Domain: Eukaryota
- Kingdom: Animalia
- Phylum: Arthropoda
- Subphylum: Chelicerata
- Class: Arachnida
- Order: Araneae
- Infraorder: Araneomorphae
- Family: Trechaleidae
- Genus: Syntrechalea; Pickard-Cambridge

Type species
- Syntrechalea tenuis

Species
- 12, see text

= Syntrechalea =

Genus of spiders

Syntrechalea is a genus of spiders in the family Trechaleidae. It was first described in 1902 by F. O. Pickard-Cambridge. As of 2017, it contains 12 species.

== Species ==
Syntrechalea comprises the following species:

- Syntrechalea adis Carico, 2008
- Syntrechalea boliviensis (Carico, 1993)
- Syntrechalea brasilia Carico, 2008
- Syntrechalea caballero Carico, 2008
- Syntrechalea caporiacco Carico, 2008
- Syntrechalea lomalinda (Carico, 1993)
- Syntrechalea napoensis Carico, 2008
- Syntrechalea neblina Silva & Lise, 2010
- Syntrechalea reimoseri (Caporiacco, 1947)
- Syntrechalea robusta Silva & Lise, 2010
- Syntrechalea syntrechaloides (Mello-Leitão, 1941)
- Syntrechalea tenuis F. O. Pickard-Cambridge, 1902
