= Shinobius =

Scientific classification
- Domain: Eukaryota
- Kingdom: Animalia
- Phylum: Arthropoda
- Subphylum: Chelicerata
- Class: Arachnida
- Order: Araneae
- Infraorder: Araneomorphae
- Family: Trechaleidae
- Genus: Shinobius
- Species: S. orientalis

Binomial name
- Shinobius orientalis (Yaginuma, 1991)

Genus of spiders

Shinobius is a genus of spiders in the family Trechaleidae. It was first described in 1991 by Yaginuma. As of 2017, it contains only one Japanese species, Shinobius orientalis.
