= Trechaleidae =

Trechaleidae Temporal range: Palaeogene–present
- Trechalea bucculenta Cristalino River, Mato Grosso, Brazil

Scientific classification
- Kingdom: Animalia
- Phylum: Arthropoda
- Subphylum: Chelicerata
- Class: Arachnida
- Order: Araneae
- Infraorder: Araneomorphae
- Family: Trechaleidae; Simon, 1890

Diversity
- 18 genera, 137 species
- blue: reported countries (WSC) green: observation hotspots (iNaturalist)

Family of spiders

Trechaleidae (tre-kah-LEE-ih-dee) is a family of araneomorph spiders first described by Eugène Simon in 1890. It includes about 140 described species in 18 genera, mostly in the New World tropics.

Other names for the family are longlegged water spiders and fishing spiders (although members of the genus Dolomedes are also commonly called fishing spiders). The family Trechaleidae is closely related to Pisauridae (nursery web spiders) and Lycosidae (wolf spiders), and the three families are sometimes referred to as the lycosid group.

== Distribution ==
All members of this family live in Central and South America except for Shinobius orientalis, which is endemic to Japan.

== Genera ==
As of January 2026, this family includes eighteen genera and 137 species:

- Amapalea Silva & Lise, 2006 – Brazil
- Barrisca Chamberlin & Ivie, 1936 – Panama, Colombia, Peru, Venezuela
- Caricelea Silva & Lise, 2007 – Peru
- Cupiennius Simon, 1891 – North America, South America
- Dossenus Simon, 1898 – Trinidad, Panama, Brazil, Colombia, Peru
- Dyrines Simon, 1903 – Panama, South America
- Enna O. Pickard-Cambridge, 1897 – Costa Rica, Honduras, Panama, Mexico, South America
- Heidrunea Brescovit & Höfer, 1994 – Brazil
- Hesydrus Simon, 1898 – Costa Rica, Honduras, Panama, South America
- Metashinobius Wei & Liu, 2025 – China
- Neoctenus Simon, 1897 – Brazil, Guyana, Peru
- Paradossenus F. O. Pickard-Cambridge, 1903 – South America
- Paratrechalea Carico, 2005 – Argentina, Brazil, Uruguay
- Rhoicinus Simon, 1898 – South America
- Shinobius Yaginuma, 1991 – China, Japan
- Syntrechalea F. O. Pickard-Cambridge, 1902 – South America
- Trechalea Thorell, 1869 – Trinidad, Costa Rica, Mexico, United States, South America
- Trechaleoides Carico, 2005 – South America
